= Okita =

Okita is a Japanese surname. Ōkita, sometimes spelled Ookita, is a different Japanese surname pronounced with a long vowel at the beginning. Notable people with these surnames include:

- Okita Rintarō (沖田 林太郎, 1826–1883), Japanese samurai in the Shinchōgumi police force of Edo (modern-day Tokyo)
- Okita Mitsu (沖田 みつ, 1833–1907), sister of Okita Sōji
- Okita Sōji (沖田 総司, 1842 or 1844 – 1868), Japanese samurai in the Shinsengumi police force of Kyoto
- Yoshio Okita (沖田 芳夫, 1903–2001), Japanese Olympic discus thrower
- Saburō Ōkita (大来 佐武郎, 1914–1993), Japanese economic and politician
- Dwight Okita (born 1958), American novelist of Japanese descent
- Jonathan Okita (born 1995), Belgian football forward
- Randall Okita (fl. 2010s), Canadian film director

Fictional characters with this surname include:

- Jūzō Okita, a fictional character in Space Battleship Yamato
- Sougo Okita, a swordsman based on Sōji Okita, from the anime and manga Gintama
