= Shinsengumi Keppūroku =

- Also known as: 新選組血風録
- Genre: Jidaigeki
- Directed by: Eiichi Kudo; Toshio Masuda
- Starring: Tetsuya Watari; Hiroaki Murakami; Shunsuke Nakamura; Ren Osugi; Tōru Minegishi
- Theme music composer: Kazuki Kuriyama
- Country of origin: Japan
- Original language: Japanese
- No. of episodes: 10

Production
- Running time: 45 minutes (per episode)
- Production companies: TV Asahi, Toei, CAL

Original release
- Network: TV Asahi
- Release: October 8 – December 30, 1998

Shinsengumi Keppūroku (新選組血風録) is a Japanese television jidaigeki or period drama, that was broadcast in 1965 and 1998. It is based on Ryōtarō Shiba's novel of the same title and Moeyo Ken. It depicts the stories of the Shinsengumi.

== Synopsis ==
Set during the Bakumatsu period, the series follows the social and political upheaval that followed the arrival of Commodore Matthew Perry's Black Ships, which ended Japan's long-standing policy of isolation. Against a backdrop of growing conflict between supporters of reform and defenders of the existing order, the focuses on the Shinsengumi, a special police force led by Kondo Isami. Through the experiences of figures such as Kondo, Hijikata Toshizo and Okita Soji, the series explores the role of the Shinsengumi during a period of significant change in Japanese history.

== Cast ==
- Tetsuya Watari as Kondō Isami
- Hiroaki Murakami as Hijikata Toshizō
- Shunsuke Nakamura as Okita Sōji
- Ren Osugi as Yamazaki Susumu
- Daijiro Tsutsumi as Nagakura Shinpachi
- Hiroyuki Konishi as Harada Sanosuke
- Takuji Fukae as Saitō Hajime
- Ben Hiura as Inoue Genzaburō
- Hiroshi Katsuno as Kido Takayoshi
- Miki Sakai as Otaka
- Tōru Minegishi as Itō Kashitarō

== Other adaptations ==
- Shinsengumi Keppūroku (1965–66) was aired on NET was started by Asahi Kurizuka.
