= Ariake Kambara =

Japanese poet and novelist (1876–1952)

Kambara Ariake
- 蒲原 有明
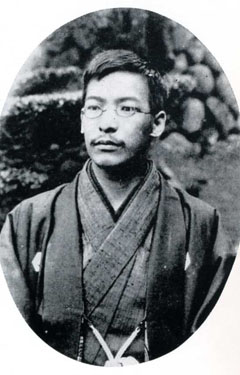
- Kambara Ariake
- Born: 15 March 1876; Tokyo, Japan
- Died: 3 February 1952 (aged 75); Kamakura, Japan
- Resting place: Kenso-ji, Moto-Azabu, Tokyo
- Occupations: Novelist, poet, translator
- Writing career
- Language: Japanese
- Genre: sonnets
- Literary movement: symbolist poetry

Kambara Hayao (蒲原 隼雄, 15 March 1876 – 3 February 1952), known by his pen name Kambara Ariake (蒲原 有明), was a Japanese poet and novelist active during the Taishō and Shōwa eras of Japan. He is also known as Kambara Yūmei.

== Early life ==
Ariake was born in Tokyo. His father, a former samurai from Higo Province, was a close associate of Etō Shimpei and active in the Meiji Restoration. He was so sickly as an infant that his parents waited for a full year to officially register his name with the local government. He moved to Tokyo together with Ōki Takatō and his mistress, leaving his wife in Higo.

== Literary career ==
While still in middle school, Ariake developed an interest in the works of Byron and Heine, and he began writing poetry in a similar style. In 1894, he started a literary journal called Ochibo Zōshi ("Gleaners’ Notes") together with Hayashida Shuncho and Yamagishi Kayo, in which he serialized his first novel, Autumn Mountain Village (秋の山ざと, ”Aki no Yamazato”). He escaped military conscription during the First Sino-Japanese War because he failed the physical examination.

In 1898, Ariake won first prize in a Yomiuri Shimbun contest with his second novel Great Mercy (大慈悲, Daijihi), which was highly praised by one of the judges, Ozaki Kōyō. However, Ariake gave up prose and decided to concentrate only on poetry for the rest of his literary career.

His first anthology, Young Leaves (草わかば, "Kusawakaba"), was published in 1902. It borrowed themes from the ancient Japanese chronicles Kojiki and Fudoki. However, the style of his works exhibited influence from western poets, such as John Keats and Dante Gabriel Rossetti. He followed with a second anthology of lyrical poetry called Dokugen Aika (独絃哀歌) in 1903. In this anthology, he also included Japanese translations of works by Keats, in which he attempted to follow the rhyming pattern of the original sonnet, but he resorted to many archaic and difficult words.

Ariake served as the manager of a popular writers' salon called Ryūdōkai, which was started in November 1904, by art critic Iwamura Tōru at a French restaurant called Ryūdōken in Azabu, Tokyo. Ariake and Iwamura were friends, and Ariake made contact with numerous people in the contemporary literary world, including Kunikida Doppo, Tayama Katai, Shimazaki Tōson, and Masamune Hakuchō, through his job as manager of the Ryūdōken.

In his fourth anthology, Ariake's Collection (有明集, Ariake Shū), in 1908, Ariake introduced the 14-line sonnet, which was previously seldom used in conventional Japanese modern poetry. Its publication gained him a reputation as a leading figure in Japanese symbolist poetry. However, this came at a time when the literary world was gravitating rapidly towards free verse, and as Ariake refused to adapt to the new trends, he gradually withdrew from literary circles.

In 1947 he published his autobiographical novel, Dreams Call On (夢は呼び交わす, ”Yume wa yobi kawasu”), which was the final poetic work of his career, although he continued to work on translations of European poets as well as literary criticism.

In 1948, Ariake was inducted into the Japan Art Academy.

Ariake moved from Tokyo to Kamakura, Kanagawa prefecture, in 1919, but was forced to relocate to Shizuoka city Shizuoka prefecture after his house collapsed during the Great Kantō Earthquake of 1923. He returned to Kamakura in 1945, after his house was burned down by the firebombing of Shizuoka during the Pacific War. He continued to live in Kamakura until his death in 1952 of acute pneumonia at the age of 76.

From 1945 to 1946, the Nobel Prize-winning Kawabata Yasunari was a house-guest at Ariake's house in Kamakura.

Ariake's grave is located at the temple of Kensō-ji in Moto-Azabu, Tokyo.

== See also ==
- Japanese literature
- List of Japanese authors
