= Kiku-ichimonji =

Group of Japanese katanas made in 1208

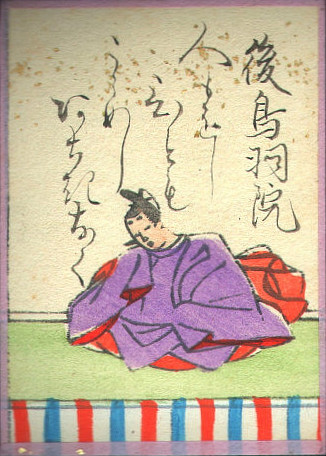
Emperor Go-Toba, who commissioned the 13 swordsmiths

Kiku-ichimonji (菊一文字, chrysanthemum + ichimonji (beeline, "Ichimonji" refers to a stylistic lineage/marking convention, not a literal phrase one would naturally translate into English).) ('Ichimonji-style blade with chrysanthemum crest'), often romanized with a somewhat misplaced hyphen as Kikuichi-monji, is a collective name given to the katana (a type of Japanese sword) made by the thirteen swordsmiths who were in attendance to the Emperor Go-Toba in 1208.

Each swordsmith was in attendance to the emperor for a month of the Japanese calendar. Most of the thirteen swordsmiths were from the Fukuoka Ichimonji school, which belongs to the Bizen school. The swordsmiths of the Fukuoka-ichimonji School traditionally inscribed only the Japanese kanji character "Ichi" (一, one) on the tang of their swords as their signature. Among the forged swords, Imperial chrysanthemum emblem was engraved on the tang of the sword which the Emperor Go-toba cooled with water, which was the process of making the sword. Therefore, the swords made by thirteen swordsmiths together with the Emperor Go-toba came to be called 'Kiku-ichimonji.' (lit,. chrysanthemum, character one) However, among the swords they forged, those with chrysanthemum emblem and "Ichi" (一, one) engraved on the tang do not exist. Existing swords with chrysanthemum emblem and 'Ichi' (一, one) engraved on their tang were made in the Edo period.

Go-Toba was interested in the construction of Japanese swords, and so he summoned these swordsmiths, granting them court rank and title, and asked them to share the secrets of the production of higher-quality swords.

== List of swordsmiths ==
- 1st month: Norimune (from Fukuoka in Bizen Province)
- 2nd month: Sadatsugu (from Ko-aoe in Bitchū Province)
- 3rd month: Nobufusa (from Fukuoka in Bizen Province)
- 4th month: Kuniyasu (from Awataguchi in Yamashiro Province)
- 5th month: Tsunetsugu (from Ko-aoe in Bitchū Province)
- Intercalary month: Hisakuni (from Awataguchi in Yamashiro Province)
- 6th month: Kunitomo (from Awataguchi in Yamashiro Province)
- 7th month: Muneyoshi (from Fukuoka, in Bizen Province)
- 8th month: Tsuguie (from Ko-aoe in Bitchū Province)
- 9th month: Sukemune (from Fukuoka in Bizen Province)
- 10th month: Yukikuni (from Fukuoka in Bizen Province)
- 11th month: Sukenari (from Fukuoka in Bizen Province)
- 12th month: Sukenobu (from Fukuoka in Bizen Province)

== Kiku-ichimonji in popular culture ==
Owing to the popularity of Shiba Ryōtarō's fiction, many modern fans of the Shinsengumi believe a Kiku-ichimonji made by Norimune to have been Okita Soji's sword. Historically, Okita used a sword made by Kiyomitsu of Kaga Province, among other blades.

In the anime and manga versions of Rurouni Kenshin, a Norimune-made Kiku-ichimonji is wielded by Seta Sōjirō (who is based on a darker Okita from the novel Shinsengumi Keppuroku.)

In the sci-fi alternate history jidaigeki action-comedy anime and manga Gintama, a member of the anime world's Shinsengumi, Okita Sougo, owns a katana dubbed "Kiku-ichimonji RX-78", which features, alongside basic features such as a sharp blade, and a digital music player with a maximum 124 hours of playtime in its hilt. Okita Sougo himself was loosely based on the historical figure Okita Soji, alluding to popular rumours that a Kiku-ichimonji was Okita Soji's sword.

Swords styled as "Kiku-ichimonji" or which share characteristics with Kiku-ichimonji appear in many video games.

In Inazuma Eleven GO, Kiku-ichimonji is used by Tsurugi Kyosuke in his Mixi-Max form.

In Final Fantasy IV, Kiku-ichimonji is a type of sword used by Edge, the ninja. It is also a type of sword wielded by ninjas and assassins in multiple games from that series.

Path of Exile features a sword named Ichimonji, paying homage to the Kiku-ichimonji and resembling them in appearance.

In Mobile Suit Gundam SEED Astray, the Gundam Astray Red Frame wields a katana named Gerbera Straight, which is a literal translation of Kiku-ichimonji.

In the Golden Sun (series) Kiku-ichimonji is a light blade that can be obtained and equipped by some characters.

In Wizardry: Tale of the Forsaken Land, a character named Hina wields the Kikuichimonji.

In Sekiro: Shadows Die Twice, ichimonji is a heavy, overhead attack found in the Ashina Arts Skill Tree.

In Touken Ranbu, during the event Special Investigation: Keiou Koufu, it is possible to get a Kiku-ichimonji named Ichimonji Norimune. If the unit used for the event has Kashuu Kiyomitsu, special cutscenes between the two of them can be unlocked.

In Overwatch, Genji's sword is named Ryu-ichimonji (龍一文字), which is a play on words by replacing the 菊/Kiku (Chrysanthemum) with 龍/Ryu (Dragon), which is the spirit animal of Genji's clan.
