= Itabashi execution grounds =

Execution site in Japan

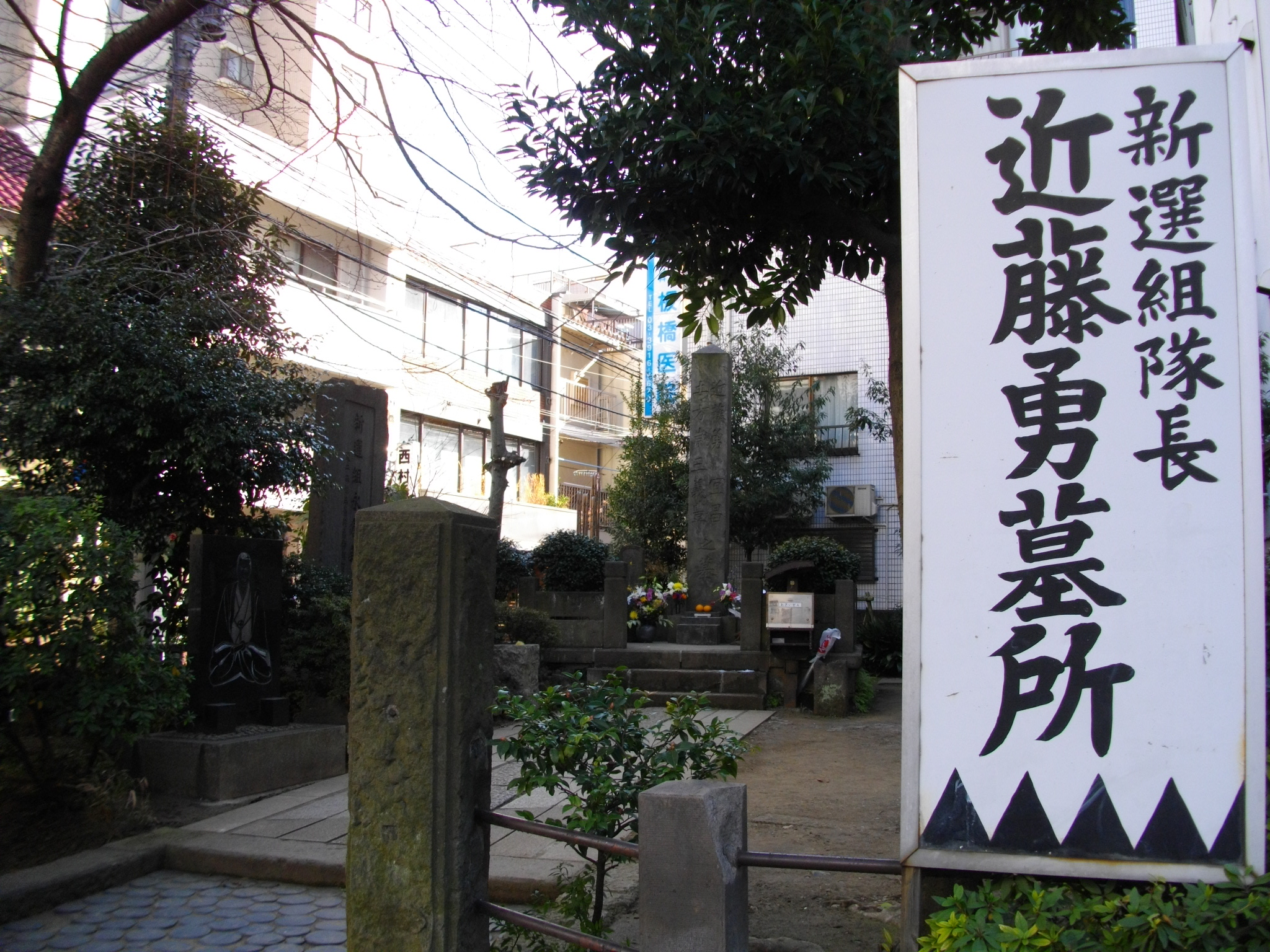
Itabashi execution grounds in 2012

The Itabashi execution grounds (板橋刑場, Itabashi Keijō) were one of the three sites in the vicinity of Edo (the forerunner of present-day Tokyo, Japan) where the Tokugawa shogunate executed criminals in the Edo period. Located near Itabashi-shuku, the first post station from Edo on the Nakasendō (a major inland route to Kyoto), it is within the city limits of modern-day Itabashi, Tokyo near JR Itabashi Station.

In 1868, Kondo Isami, leader of the Shinsengumi, was jailed for twenty days at Itabashi, and beheaded at the execution grounds. A memorial to him stands at the east (Takino-gawa) exit of Itabashi Station. On the right side are engraved the names of forty Shinsengumi people who died in war, and on the left, the names of 64 who died of disease, seppuku, or other causes. To the left of the memorial is a Buddha statue dedicated to people who died without relatives to care for their graves, and to the right, the graves of Kondō and Nagakura Shinpachi, who is said to have erected the memorial. There is also a stone for Hijikata Toshizō, who died in battle at Goryōkaku.
