= Okita Mitsu =

Japanese noble (1833–1907)

- 沖田 みつ
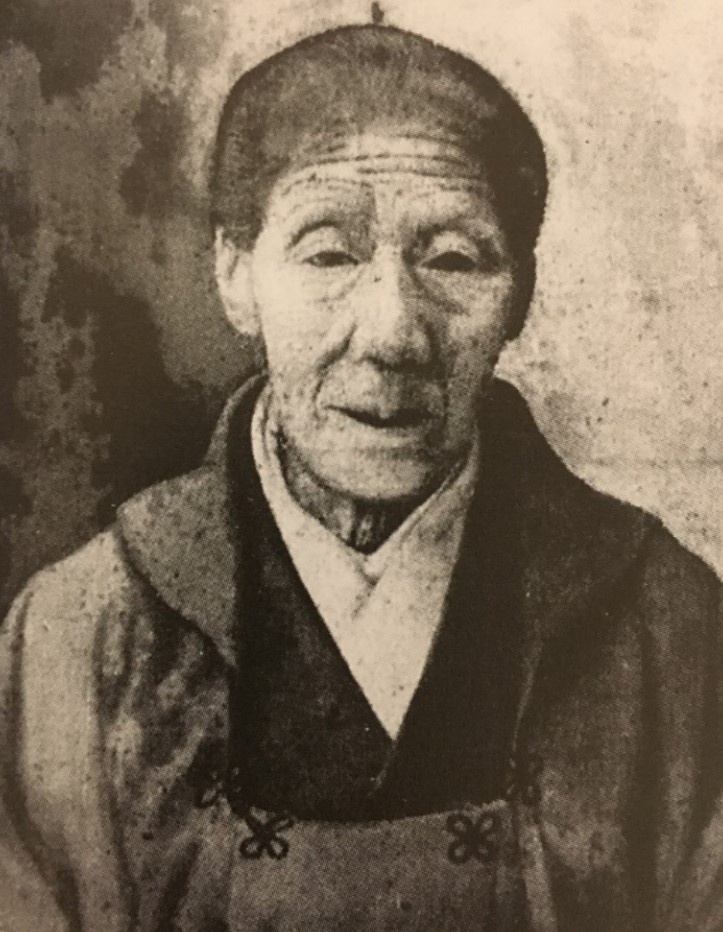
- Mitsu in her later years
- Born: May 26, 1833; Shirakawa Domain, Mutsu Province, Japan
- Died: November 2, 1907 (aged 74); Manchuria, Qing China
- Burial place: Senshō-ji, Moto-Azabu, Azabu, Minato, Tokyo, Japan
- Known for: Eldest sister of Okita Sōji
- Spouse: Okita Rintarō (m. 1846; died 1883)
- Father: Okita Katsujirō
- Relatives: Okita Kin (sister); Okita Sōji (brother); Kondo Shusuke (adoptive father)

Okita Mitsu (沖田 みつ; May 26, 1833 – November 2, 1907) was the eldest sister of Okita Sōji, captain of the first unit of the Shinsengumi.

== Background ==
She was born the eldest daughter of Okita Katsujirō, in a samurai family from Mutsu Province. In 1846, she married Inoue Rintarō, who later became Okita Rintarō, after being adopted into the Okita family. They had a child in 1853.

In 1868, during the Boshin War, Sōji was suffering from tuberculosis and thus stayed with Mitsu and her family in Edo, while the rest of the Tokugawa shogunate forces retreated to the Tohoku region. Mitsu looked after the terminally ill Sōji, until she and her family were forced to evacuate to Shonai han. Sōji died on May 30 of that year.

Mitsu returned to Edo in 1872. Her husband died in 1883, and she went to live with her youngest son in Manchuria. She died in 1907.

== In popular culture ==
In Gintama, Okita Sōgo's sister, Okita Mitsuba, is based on her.

In the 2004 Taiga drama Shinsengumi!, she was portrayed by Yasuko Sawaguchi.
