= Rōshigumi =

- 浪士組
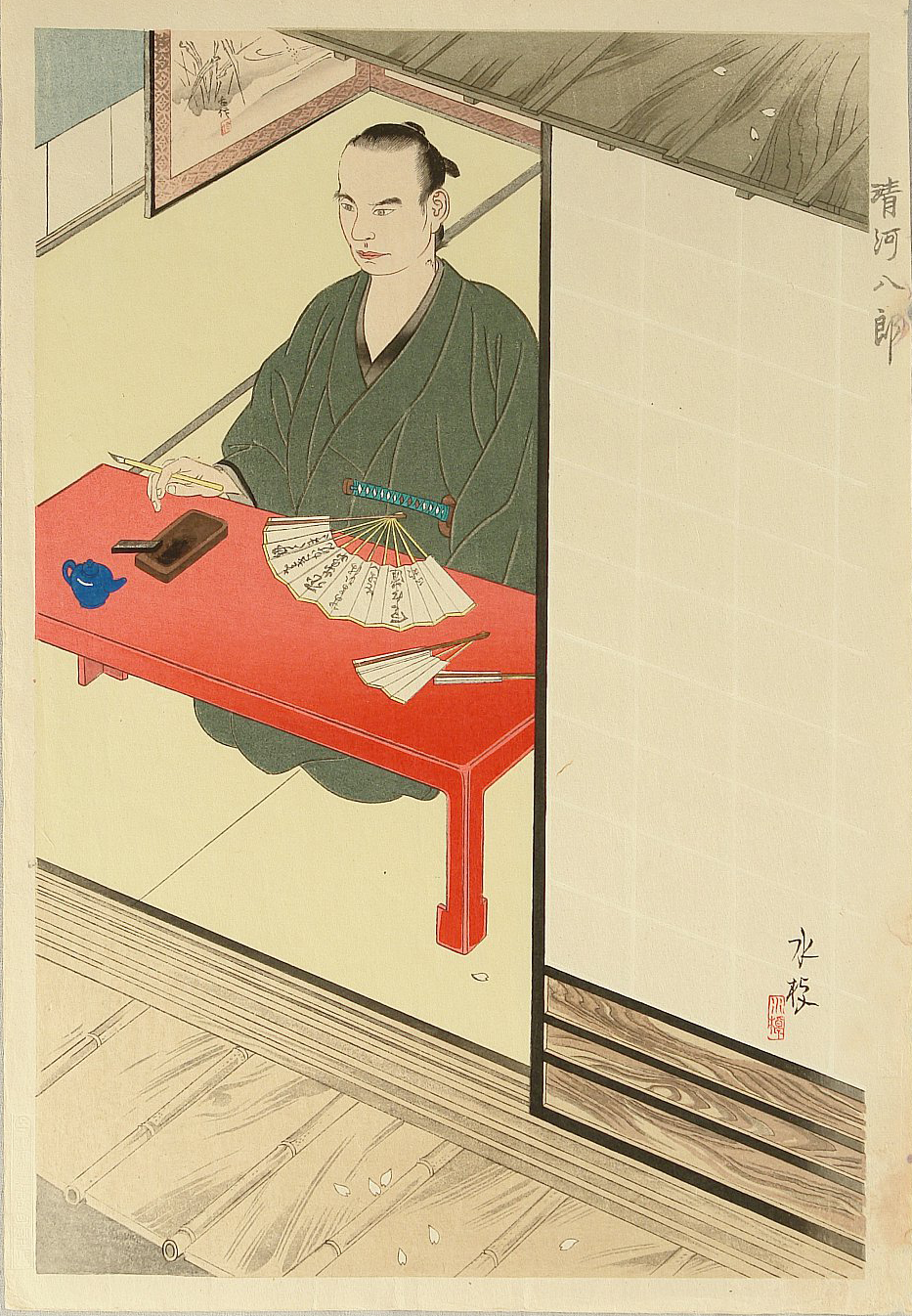
- Portrait of founder Kiyokawa Hachirō
- Active: October 19, 1862
- Disbanded: April 10, 1863
- Country: Japan
- Allegiance: Tokugawa bakufu
- Size: 234

Commanders
- Commander: Kyokawa Hachirō
- Nominal Commander: Matsudaira Katamori

The Rōshigumi (浪士組) was a group of 234 masterless samurai, founded by Kiyokawa Hachirō in 1862. Loyal to the shogun, they were supposed to act as the protectors of the Tokugawa shōgun, but were disbanded upon their arrival in Kyoto in 1863.

== History ==
=== Formation ===
Kiyokawa Hachirō formed the Rōshigumi with funding from the Tokugawa shogunate on October 19, 1862. Originally, he claimed it was formed for protecting the Tokugawa shōgun in Kyoto and preparing for military action against Western countries. However, he lied to the regime; his goal was to gather people to work with the imperialists and not the shogunate government.

The Rōshigumi met on March 26 (lunar calendar February 8), 1863 in Edo and left for Kyoto. Kondō Isami, Hijikata Toshizō, Okita Sōji, Inoue Genzaburō, Tōdō Heisuke, Harada Sanosuke, Nagakura Shinpachi. Serizawa Kamo, Niimi Nishiki, Nakazawa Koto, Hirayama Gorou, Hirama Juusuke, and Noguchi Kengi were all among the members of the Rōshigumi. Two days later, while the Rōshigumi left for Kyoto, Kondo was responsible for assigning lodges for the members. However, he accidentally forgot about Serizawa's group, leading to a famous incident where Serizawa lost his temper and, with the help of his group, created a huge bonfire outside the lodges as an insult to Kondo.

=== Disbandment ===
On April 10 (lunar calendar February 23), 1863, the Rōshigumi arrived at Kyoto and the group stayed in Yagitei, a Mibu village outside Kyoto. Surprisingly, when they had just arrived in Kyoto, Kiyokawa suddenly commanded the group to return to Edo. By then, he had secretly submitted a letter to the imperialists stating that his Rōshigumi were to work only for the Emperor Kōmei.

== Aftermath ==
The disbanded Rōshigumi members returned to Edo upon Kiyokawa's command. However, nineteen members, mainly from the Mito clan, dissented and stayed behind, including Kondō and Serizawa, and formed the Mibu Rōshigumi (壬生浪士組). Initially, the Mibu Rōshigumi were called Miburō (壬生浪), meaning "rōnin of Mibu". At the time, Mibu was a village south west of Kyoto, and was the place where they were stationed. On August 18, 1863, the Mibu Rōshigumi was renamed the Shinsengumi (新選組; "New Selected Group") by Emperor Kōmei.

In response, a Tokugawa official made spies out of former Rōshigumi members Tomouchi Yoshio and Iesato Jiro, forced them to stay in Kyoto, and forced them to join Serizawa and Kondo's group in order to keep an eye on them.

The other dissident members of the Rōshigumi who returned to Edo became the founding members of the Shinchōgumi (新徴組) (the Shinsengumi's brother league in Edo) with Okita Rintarō, the brother-in-law of Okita Sōji, as a commander.
