= Shinsengumi! =

2004 Japanese television series

- Written by: Kōki Mitani
- Starring: Shingo Katori; Tatsuya Fujiwara; Koji Yamamoto; Yūka; Joe Odagiri; Nakamura Kankurō VI; Tarō Yamamoto; Masato Sakai; Tomomitsu Yamaguchi; Takashi Kobayashi; Shōei; Nakamura Shidō II; Tomoko Tabata; Kazue Fukiishi; Michitaka Tsutsui; Shōsuke Tanihara; Keiko Toda; Goro Ibuki; Ken Ishiguro; Asahi Kurizuka; Tsuyoshi Ihara; Noda Hideki; Kyōka Suzuki; Yōsuke Eguchi; Yōko Nogiwa; Yasuko Sawaguchi; Kōichi Satō; Shirō Itō; Kunie Tanaka; Kōji Ishizaka
- Theme music composer: Junichi Hirokami
- Opening theme: John Ken Nuzzo and NHK Symphony Orchestra
- Composer: Takayuki Hattori
- Country of origin: Japan
- Original language: Japanese
- No. of episodes: 50 (49 + New Year's Special, 2006) (list of episodes)

Production
- Executive producer: Koji Yoshikawa
- Running time: approx. 43 min.

Original release
- Network: NHK
- Release: January 11 – December 12, 2004

Related
- Yoshitsune

Shinsengumi! (新選組!) is a 2004 Taiga drama historical fiction television series produced by Japanese broadcaster NHK. It was a popular drama about the Shinsengumi, a Japanese special police force from the Bakumatsu period.

Actors include Koji Yamamoto, Tatsuya Fujiwara, Joe Odagiri, and Shingo Katori of the pop idol group SMAP. It was written by Japanese director and playwright, Kōki Mitani.

== Staff ==
- Original: Kōki Mitani
- Music: Takayuki Hattori
- Titling: Tansetsu Ogino
- Narrator: Yasuo Kodera
- Historical research: Manabu Ōishi, Tatsuya Yamamura
- Architectural research: Sei Hirai
- Clothing research: Kiyoko Koizumi
- Production coordinator: Kōji Kikkawa
- Casting: Kazuhiko Itō
- Sword fight arranger : Kunishirō Hayashi

== Cast ==
Shinsengumi

- Shingo Katori as Kondō Isami
- Kōji Yamamoto as Hijikata Toshizō
- Tatsuya Fujiwara as Okita Sōji
- Joe Odagiri as Saitō Hajime
- Nakamura Kantarō II as Tōdō Heisuke
- Tarō Yamamoto as Harada Sanosuke
- Masato Sakai as Yamanami Keisuke
- Tomomitsu Yamaguchi as Nagakura Shinpachi
- Takashi Kobayashi as Inoue Genzaburō
- Shoei as Shimada Kai
- Kichiya Katsura as Yamazaki Susumu
- Koji Ohkura as Kawai Kisaburo
- Norito Yashima as Takeda Kanryuusai

Seichū-rōshi gumi

- Kōichi Satō as Serizawa Kamo
- Kazuyuki Aijima as Niimi Nishiki
- Tadashi Sakata as Hirayama Gorō
- Gōshū as Hirama Jūsuke

Itō-dōjō party

- Shōsuke Tanihara as Itō Kashitarō
- Masato Obara as Kanō Washio

Aizu Domain

- Michitaka Tsutsui as Matsudaira Katamori
- Kenichi Yajima as Hirosawa Tomijirō
- Yasuyoshi Hara as Teshirogi Suguemon

Tosa Domain

- Yōsuke Eguchi as Sakamoto Ryōma
- Hiroki Miyake as Mochizuki Kameyata
- Nozomu Masuzawa as Nakaoka Shintarō

Chōshū Domain

- Ken Ishiguro as Kido Takayoshi
- Hiroyuki Ikeuchi as Kusaka Genzui

Satsuma Domain

- Takashi Ukaji as Saigō Takamori
- Yamato Yasumura as Ōkubo Toshimichi
- Takato Gohō as Kuroda Ryōsuke

Tokugawa shogunate

- Tomohiko Imai as Tokugawa Yoshinobu – the last shogun
- Tsuyoshi Ihara as Sasaki Tadasaburō
- Hideki Noda as Katsu Kaishū
- Isao Sasaki as Uchiyama Hikojirō
- Tsuyoshi Kusanagi as Enomoto Takeaki
- Tetsushi Tanaka as Matsumoto Ryōjun

Imperial House

- Nakamura Fukusuke IX as Emperor Kōmei – the 121st emperor
- Yūji Nakamura as Iwakura Tomomi

Others

- Yasuko Sawaguchi as Okita Mitsu - Okita Sōji's eldest sister
- Kōji Ishizaka as Sakuma Shōzan
- Tetsurō Sagawa as Onogawa Hidegorō
- Mainoumi Shūhei as Kumakawa Kuwajirō – a sumo wrestler
- Daishi Nobuyuki as Kurogami – a sumo wrestler
- Jay Kabira as Henry Heusken
- Marty Kuehnert as Townsend Harris
- Yūka as Okō
- Asahi Kurizuka as Hijikata Tamejirō, Toshizō's older brother
- Rei Kikukawa as Ikumatsu

== Episode list ==
The series originally aired from January 11 to December 12, 2004. The initial viewership of the series was 26.3%, however, it later dropped to an average of 17.4%. On September 29, 2025, the series officially began streaming on NHK.

No.	Title (Note: Titles are literally translated)	Original release date
1	"The Black Ships Arrive"; Transliteration: "Kurofune ga Kita" (Japanese: 黒船が来た)	January 11, 2004
2	"What is the Pride of Tama?"; Transliteration: "Tama no Hokori to wa" (Japanese: 多摩の誇りとは)	January 18, 2004
3	"Mother Runs Away from Home"; Transliteration: "Haha wa Iede suru" (Japanese: 母は家出する)	January 25, 2004
4	"Heaven and Earth Turn Upside Down"; Transliteration: "Tenchi Hikkurikaeru" (Japanese: 天地ひっくり返る)	February 1, 2004
5	"On the Wedding Day"; Transliteration: "Konrei no Hi ni" (Japanese: 婚礼の日に)	February 8, 2004
6	"Heusken, Run!"; Transliteration: "Hyūsken Nigero" (Japanese: ヒュースケン逃げろ)	February 15, 2004
7	"Celebrating the Succession of the 4th Generation"; Transliteration: "Iwai Yondaime Shūmei" (Japanese: 祝四代目襲名)	February 22, 2004
8	"What Will Become of Japan?"; Transliteration: "Dō Naru Nihon" (Japanese: どうなる日本)	February 29, 2004
9	"It All Started with This Letter"; Transliteration: "Subete wa Kono Tegami" (Japanese: すべてはこの手紙)	March 7, 2004
10	"Finally, the Roshigumi"; Transliteration: "Iyoiyo Rōshigumi" (Japanese: いよいよ浪士組)	March 14, 2004
11	"Mother, I'm Off"; Transliteration: "Haha-ue Ittekimasu" (Japanese: 母上行って来ます)	March 21, 2004
12	"To the West!"; Transliteration: "Nishi e!" (Japanese: 西へ！)	March 28, 2004
13	"Kamo Serizawa Explodes"; Transliteration: "Serizawa Kamo, Bakuhatsu" (Japanese: 芹沢鴨、爆発)	April 4, 2004
14	"Arrival in Kyoto"; Transliteration: "Kyō e Tōchaku" (Japanese: 京へ到着)	April 11, 2004
15	"To Go or To Stay?"; Transliteration: "Iku ka, Nokoru ka" (Japanese: 行くか、残るか)	April 18, 2004
16	"A Brief Note, Lady Tsune"; Transliteration: "Ippitsu Keijō, Tsune-sama" (Japanese: 一筆啓上、つね様)	April 25, 2004
17	"The First Death"; Transliteration: "Hajimari no Shi" (Japanese: はじまりの死)	May 2, 2004
18	"First Deployment! Mibu Roshigumi"; Transliteration: "Hatsushutsudō! Mibu Rōshi" (Japanese: 初出動! 壬生浪士)	May 9, 2004
19	"On the Night of the Wake"; Transliteration: "Tsuya no Hi ni" (Japanese: 通夜の日に)	May 16, 2004
20	"Don't Get Kamo Drunk"; Transliteration: "Kamo o Yowasu na" (Japanese: 鴨を酔わすな)	May 23, 2004
21	"The Dokkoi Incident"; Transliteration: "Dokkoi Jiken" (Japanese: どっこい事件)	May 30, 2004
22	"Kamo on the Roof"; Transliteration: "Yane no Ue no Kamo" (Japanese: 屋根の上の鴨)	June 6, 2004
23	"Coup d'État of August 18"; Transliteration: "Seihen, Hachigatsu Jūhachinichi" (Japanese: 政変、八月十八日)	June 13, 2004
24	"An Unavoidable Path"; Transliteration: "Sakete wa Tōrenu Michi" (Japanese: 避けては通れぬ道)	June 20, 2004
25	"Birth of the Shinsengumi"; Transliteration: "Shinsengumi Tanjō" (Japanese: 新選組誕生)	June 27, 2004
26	"Commander Isami Kondo"; Transliteration: "Kyokuchō Kondō Isami" (Japanese: 局長 近藤勇)	July 4, 2004
27	"Just Before the Ikedaya Incident"; Transliteration: "Chokuzen, Ikedaya Jiken" (Japanese: 直前、池田屋事件)	July 11, 2004
28	"And onto Ikedaya"; Transliteration: "Soshite Ikedaya e" (Japanese: そして池田屋へ)	July 18, 2004
29	"Defeat Choshu"; Transliteration: "Chōshū o Ute" (Japanese: 長州を討て)	July 25, 2004
30	"Shinpachi Nagakura's Rebellion"; Transliteration: "Nagakura Shinpachi, Hanran" (Japanese: 永倉新八、反乱)	August 1, 2004
31	"Returning to Edo"; Transliteration: "Edo e Kaeru" (Japanese: 江戸へ帰る)	August 8, 2004
32	"Yamanami Desertion"; Transliteration: "Yamanami Dassō" (Japanese: 山南脱走)	August 15, 2004
33	"Death of a Friend"; Transliteration: "Tomo no Shi" (Japanese: 友の死)	August 22, 2004
34	"Great Commotion at Teradaya"; Transliteration: "Teradaya Ōsōdō" (Japanese: 寺田屋大騒動)	August 29, 2004
35	"Farewell, Mibu Village"; Transliteration: "Saraba Mibu-mura" (Japanese: さらば壬生村)	September 5, 2004
36	"Showdown with the Mimawarigumi!"; Transliteration: "Taiketsu Mimawarigumi!" (Japanese: 対決見廻組！)	September 12, 2004
37	"Conclusion of the Satcho Alliance!"; Transliteration: "Satchō Dōmei Teiketsu!" (Japanese: 薩長同盟締結！)	September 19, 2004
38	"Seppuku of a Certain Warrior"; Transliteration: "Aru Taishi no Seppuku" (Japanese: ある隊士の切腹)	September 26, 2004
39	"The Shogun Dies"; Transliteration: "Shōgun, Shisu" (Japanese: 将軍、死す)	October 3, 2004
40	"Heisuke's Journey"; Transliteration: "Heisuke no Tabidachi" (Japanese: 平助の旅立ち)	October 10, 2004
41	"Kanryusai's Downfall"; Transliteration: "Kanryūsai, Tenraku" (Japanese: 観柳斎、転落)	October 17, 2004
42	"Ryoma Assassination"; Transliteration: "Ryōma Ansatsu" (Japanese: 龍馬暗殺)	October 24, 2004
43	"Decisive Battle of Aburanokoji"; Transliteration: "Kessen, Aburanokōji" (Japanese: 決戦、油小路)	October 31, 2004
44	"Attack on the Commander"; Transliteration: "Kyokuchō Shūgeki" (Japanese: 局長襲撃)	November 7, 2004
45	"Gen-san Dies"; Transliteration: "Gen-san, Shisu" (Japanese: 源さん、死す)	November 14, 2004
46	"To the East"; Transliteration: "Higashi e" (Japanese: 東へ)	November 21, 2004
47	"Reunion"; Transliteration: "Saikai" (Japanese: 再会)	November 28, 2004
48	"Nagareyama"; Transliteration: "Nagareyama" (Japanese: 流山)	December 5, 2004
49	"My Beloved Friend"; Transliteration: "Itoshiki Tomo yo" (Japanese: 愛しき友よ)	December 12, 2004

=== Specials ===
Shinsengumi! Special (新選組！スペシャル, Shinsengumi! Supesharu) is a compilation of the entire story as well as including some unreleased footage. The special was released three parts that were originally aired on December 26, 2004, at 4:45 PM, 7:30 PM, and 9:00 PM. The special was compiled into a full 3 hours and 42 minutes long film and released on DVD on March 25, 2005.

No.	Title	Original release date
1	"Part 1: "Become a Samurai!""; Transliteration: "Dai-ichi-bu: "Bushi ni Naru!"" (Japanese: 第1部「武士になる！」)	December 26, 2004
2	"Part 2: "The Birth of Shinsengumi""; Transliteration: "Dai-ni-bu: "Shinsengumi Tanjō"" (Japanese: 第2部「新選組誕生」)	December 26, 2004
3	"Part 3: "Dear Friend""; Transliteration: "Dai-san-bu: "Itoshiki Tomo yo"" (Japanese: 第3部「愛しき友よ」)	December 26, 2004

== Reception ==
During the 2005 43th Television Drama Academy Awards held by Kadokawa, the series won the best show award. For the series, Shingo Katori won the best actor award, Koji Yamamoto won best supporting actor, and Kōki Mitani won the best screenplay award.
