= Inoue Genzaburō =

Japanese swordsman (1829-1869)

Inoue Genzaburō (井上 源三郎, April 4, 1829 – January 29, 1868) was born in Hino, Tokyo. He was the captain of the sixth unit of the Shinsengumi which were a special police force for the Tokugawa regime. Inoue was the oldest unit captain of the Shinsengumi.

Like his older brother, Inoue Matsugoro, Inoue Genzaburō was also a practitioner of the Tennen Rishin-ryū and mastered all the techniques of the school in 1860. However, it is a misconception that he lived at the Shieikan. In 1863, he joined the Rōshigumi together with Kondō Isami and other members of the Shieikan.

Inoue Genzaburō was related to Okita Rintarō (Okita Sōji's brother-in-law).

He arrested eight members of the Ishin Shishi during the Ikedaya Affair in 1864.

Inoue died during the Battle of Toba–Fushimi (the first battle of the Boshin War) in January 1868.

== Inoue in Fiction ==
Inoue is featured in Kaze Hikaru (manga), Getsumei Seiki (manga), Studio Deen's Hakuōki: Shinsengumi Kitan (anime), and The Blue Wolves of Mibu (manga and anime.) He is also depicted in the 1999 film Gohatto and NHK's drama series Shinsengumi!, as well as in the Sega video game Ryu ga Gotoku: Ishin! and its remastered edition Like a Dragon: Ishin!, where he is the equivalent of Osamu Kashiwagi.
