= Tamoto Kenzō =

Japanese photographer

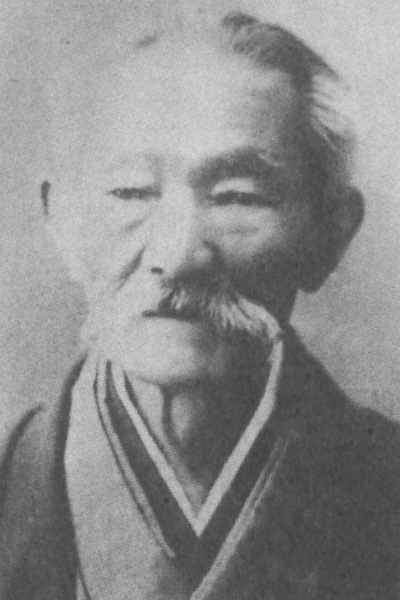
Tamoto Kenzō

Tamoto Kenzō (田本 研造; 1832–1912) was a Japanese photographer.

== Early life ==
Tamoto was born in Kumano, in the Mie Prefecture of Honshu. When he was twenty-three, he moved to Nagasaki to study western culture. In 1859, he relocated to Hakodate, where he lost a foot due to frostbite.

== Photographic career ==
The surgeon who amputated Tamoto’s foot had an interest in photography, specifically ambrotypes, and Tamoto became his apprentice. It was not until 1866 that he began formally working as a photographer.

In 1867, he photographed the construction of the last castle to be built in Japan, Fukuyama Castle.

Tamoto took photographs of military leaders Enomoto Takeaki and Hijikata Toshizō during the Battle of Hakodate between 1868 and 1869.

Tamoto opened his own portrait studio in Hakodate in 1869. Starting in 1871, he documented the improvements to infrastructure in the Hokkaido region, eventually presenting 158 photographs of the process to the Settlement Office.

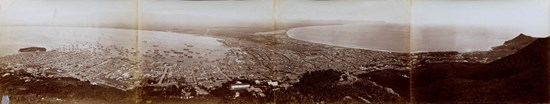
Full panoramic albumen silver print photograph of Hakodate, taken c. 1880, attributed to Tamoto Kenzō
