= Asahi Kurizuka =

Japanese actor (1937–2025)

Asahi Kurizuka (Japanese: 栗塚 旭, Hepburn: Kurizuka Asahi; May 9, 1937 – September 9, 2025) was a Japanese actor. He made his film debut in Satsuo Yamamoto's The War Without Weapons (1960). In 1966, he received the Elan d'or Award for Newcomer of the Year. Specializing in jidaigeki, Kurizuka was known for portraying Hijikata Toshizō, a role he played multiple times throughout his career.

On September 12, 2025, news outlets reported that Kurizuka had died at his home in Sakyō-ku, Kyoto on September 9. He had been scheduled to appear on Mitsuya Seizaemon Zanjitsuroku, a jidaigeki for BS Fuji, but could not be contacted prior to the start of production. When he did not show up on his scheduled filming day, the police were asked to perform a wellness check, where they confirmed his death.

== Filmography ==
=== Film ===
- Bukinaki Tatakai (1960)
- Onna no Issho (1967), Ogi Soichi
- Moeyo Ken (1966), Hijikata Toshizō
- Harbor Light Yokohama (1968)
- Futari Biyori (2005), Kuroda Gen
- Shundo (2013), Nishizaki
- Ninja Kids: Summer Mission Impossible (2013)
- Chambara: The Art of Japanese Swordplay (2015)
- The Old Capital (2016)
- Love's Twisting Path (2019), Monk
- Musicophilia (2021)
- Toshizō no Katana (2023), Hijikata Toshizō

=== Television ===
- Shinsengumi Keppūroku (1965), Hijikata Toshizō
- Warera Kyūnin no Senki (1966)
- Ore wa Yōjinbō (1967)
- Kaze, co-starring Sanae Tsuchida (1967)
- Moeyo Ken (1970), Hijikata Toshizō
- Shinsengumi (1973), Hijikata Toshizō
- Inochi Moyu (1981), Hijikata Toshizō
- Shinsengumi! (2004), Hijikata Tamejirō
- The Unfettered Shogun (xxxx) (as semi-regular character Yamada Asaemon)
