= Hijikata Toshizō =

Japanese warrior (1835–1869)

Hijikata Toshizō 土方 歳三
- 土方 歳三 義豊
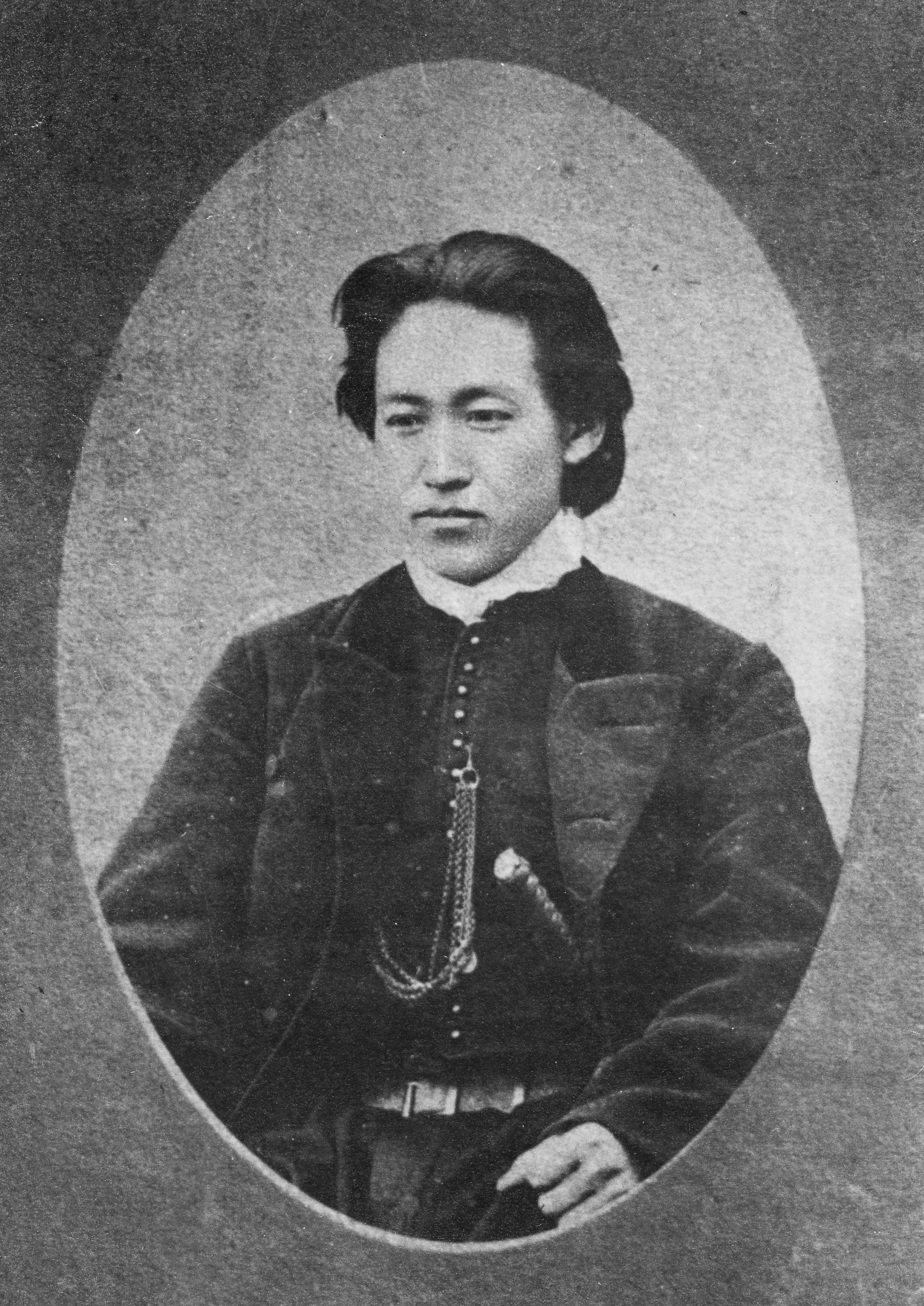
- Hijikata in 1869, photograph by Tamoto Kenzō
- Born: Hijikata Toshizō Yoshitoyo; May 31, 1835; Musashi Province, Honshu, Japan
- Died: June 20, 1869 (aged 34); Hakodate, Ezo, Japan
- Cause of death: Gunshot wound
- Burial place: unknown
- Other name: Naitō Hayato
- Relatives: Hijikata Yoshiatsu (father); Etsu (mother); Hijikata Tamejiro (brother); Hijikata Kiroku (brother); Hijikata Shuu (sister); Kasuya Ryojin (brother); Satō Nobu (sister); Satō Hikogorō (brother-in-law)
- Military career
- Allegiance: Tokugawa Shogunate; Republic of Ezo
- Branch: Rōshigumi (former); Mibu Rōshigumi・Shinsengumi
- Service years: 1863–1869
- Rank: Vice-Commander; Deputy Defence Minister
- Nicknames: Oni no fukuchō (鬼の副長, "Demon Vice-Commander")
- Conflicts: Coup of August 18, 1863; Ikedaya incident; Kinmon incident; Boshin War; Battle of Toba–Fushimi; Battle of Kōshū-Katsunuma; Battle of Utsunomiya Castle; Battle of Bonari Pass; Battle of Miyako Bay; Battle of Futamata; Battle of Hakodate †

Hijikata Toshizō (土方 歳三; May 31, 1835 – June 20, 1869) was a Japanese swordsman of the Bakumatsu period and Vice-Commander (副長, Fukuchō) of the Shinsengumi. As Vice-Commander, he served the Tokugawa Shogunate and co-led his group in its resistance against the imperial rule brought about by the Meiji Restoration. He fought against the Imperial Army during the Boshin War until his death at the Battle of Hakodate, which ended the war.

== Background ==
Hijikata Toshizō Yoshitoyo (土方 歳三 義豊) was born on May 31, 1835, in the Ishida village, Tama region of Musashi Province (present day Ishida, Hino, Tokyo), Japan. He was the youngest of ten children and his father Hijikata Yoshiatsu (Hayato), a well-to-do farmer, died a few months before his birth. His eldest brother Tamejiro, was born blind and as a result, could not inherit the family property. His third older brother Daisaku (later Kasuya Ryojin), was adopted to another family and would later become a physician. His eldest sister Shuu died when he was about three years old and his mother Etsu also died when he was six years old, and he was therefore raised by his second older brother Kiroku and sister-in-law.

He was apparently tall compared to the average Japanese men of the period, and it is said that he was very handsome. He was said to be spoiled at an early age and was alleged to be mean to all but his friends and family. This changed when a 21-year-old swordsman from the Aizu clan known for opposing the Reformists was forced to commit seppuku. When Hijikata attended the man's funeral, he apparently cried in public.

Hijikata spent his youth selling his family's Ishida san'yaku (medicine for treating injuries such as bruises and broken bones) while practicing his self-taught kenjutsu. His brother-in-law, Satō Hikogorō, who was married to his older sister Nobu, managed a Tennen Rishin-ryū dojo in Hino; through Satō, Hijikata later met Kondō Isami and was formally enrolled at the Tennen Rishin-ryū's Shieikan in 1859. Although Hijikata himself never fully mastered the Tennen Rishin-ryū, it is said that he managed to develop the "Shinsengumi-Kenjutsu" fighting style from the Tennen Rishin-ryū.

An arrangement was made by his eldest brother Tamejiro for him to marry Okoto, the daughter of the shamisen shop owners. Since he had already planned to join the Rōshigumi with Kondō Isami, Hijikata told them that after he got a promotion, he would carry out his marriage.

== Shinsengumi period ==
In 1863, Hijikata and Kondō Isami joined the Rōshigumi in Edo, they arrived in Mibu, Kyoto and remained there as the Mibu Rōshigumi while the rest returned to Edo. Later, when Mibu Rōshigumi was renamed as the Shinsengumi, Kondō and two other men, Serizawa Kamo and Niimi Nishiki, became joint leaders of the group, and Hijikata served as one of the deputy leaders. Shinsengumi served as a special police force in Kyoto that fought against the Reformists under Matsudaira Katamori, the Daimyō of Aizu.

However, Serizawa and Niimi began fighting, drinking, and extorting money from merchants in Kyoto, which started to tarnish the reputation of Shinsengumi and earned the group the derogatory nickname of "Wolves of Mibu" (壬生狼, Miburō). Hijikata found enough proof against Niimi in these matters and ordered him to commit seppuku on October 19. Later on October 30 (or October 28) at night, Hijikata and the selected Shinsengumi members went into the house of Yagi Gennojō and assassinated Serizawa, his mistress Oume, and one of his followers Hirayama Goro, with Hirama Jūsuke been the only survivor who fled that night. Kondō became the sole leader of Shinsengumi, with Yamanami Keisuke as his Vice-Commander. During the Ikedaya incident in the evening on July 8, 1864, Hijikata led a second group of 23 Shinsengumi members after Kondō's to help arresting a group of shishi at the Ikedaya Inn.

Some time after the Zenzaiya incident, Yamanami Keisuke tried to leave Shinsengumi, despite the regulation against deserters. As a result, he committed seppuku with Okita Sōji as his Kaishakunin on March 20 (lunar calendar February 23), 1865; and Hijikata took over as Vice-Commander. Due to his position in the Shinsengumi, which would be dangerous for anyone close to him, Hijikata felt that he had no choice but to cancel his marriage engagement with Okoto. Although he later had many lovers, he never came close to making a commitment to any of them.

The Shinsengumi grew to 140 men, which included a number of farmers and merchants whose livelihood would be threatened if the Tokugawa shogunate was overthrown. The regulations set up by Shinsengumi within Kyoto were strict and Hijikata was known to be harsh in enforcing them, hence his nickname: "Demon Vice-Commander" (鬼の副長, Oni no fukuchō). Even within the Shinsengumi itself, regulations were strictly enforced by Hijikata. As usual, deserters and traitors were forced to commit seppuku.

Hijikata owned, among others, a sword signed "Izumi no Kami Kanesada" (和泉守兼定), made by the 11th and last generation Aizu Kanesada (1837-1903).

Together with the rest of the Shinsengumi, Hijikata became a hatamoto in 1867 and took the name of Naitō Hayato (but reverted to his original name after Kondō was captured and executed during the Boshin war). He was given the rank of Yoriai (寄合格 Yoriai-kaku) in early 1868.

== Boshin War ==
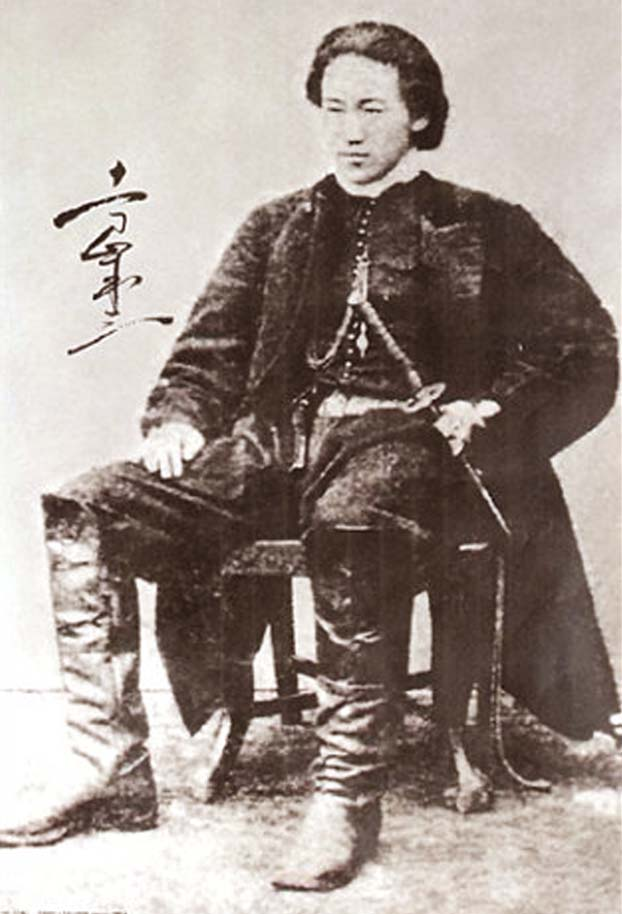
Hijikata Toshizo

Following the Boshin War in 1868, Kondō and Hijikata led the Shinsengumi in their final battles against the new government and fought in the Battle of Toba–Fushimi in January 1868. The Shinsengumi returned to Edo and was later reformed into a unit known as the Kōyō Chinbutai (甲陽鎮撫隊, "Pacification Corps") and departed from Edo for Kōfu Castle on March 24 upon orders to suppress the uprisings there. But while on the way there, they received news on March 28 that the Kōfu Castle was taken by Imperial Court forces led by Itagaki Taisuke and later settled at the town of Katsunuma five miles east of Kōfu.

On March 29, 1868, Kondō, Hijikata and the Kōyō Chinbutai resisted an attack by the Imperial forces at the Battle of Kōshū-Katsunuma for about two hours but lost, and they were scattered and fled to Edo.

On April 11, 1868, Kondō, Hijikata and the Kōyō Chinbutai departed Edo again and later set up a temporary headquarters at the Kaneko family estate, northeast of Edo. They later moved to a new quarters in Nagareyama on April 25, 1868.

During the training at Nagareyama on April 26, 1868, the Kōyō Chinbutai were caught by surprise by the 200 strong Imperial forces led by Vice-chief of Staff Arima Tota of Satsuma Domain and Kondō was ordered to go with them to their camp at Koshigaya. He was later brought to Itabashi on April 27, 1868, for questioning. On the same day Hijikata went to Edo to see Katsu Kaishū and asked for his help in getting a pardon for Kondō. On the following day, a messenger arrived at Itabashi with a letter seemingly written by Katsu requesting that Kondō's life to be spared, but the messenger was arrested and the request was denied.

Following his trial on April 30, 1868, Kondō was executed at Itabashi execution grounds on May 17, 1868. Hijikata, convalesced from a foot injury sustained at the Battle of Utsunomiya Castle, brought Kondō's strands of hair to Aizu and was said to have personally supervised the erection of Kondō's grave memorial at Tenneiji Temple.

Following the Battle of Bonari Pass, the next day on October 7, 1868, Hijikata met Saitō Hajime at the Inawashiro Castle and stayed at the Saitoya inn in Wakamatsu. When Hijikata decided to retreat from Aizu, Saitō and a small group of Shinsengumi parted with Hijikata and continued to battle in the Battle of Aizu until the very end. Hijikata and his rest of the Shinsengumi went to Sendai, where he joined up with Enomoto Takeaki's fleet.

He knew he was fighting a losing battle, and told the physician Matsumoto Ryōjun:

I am not going to battle to win. With the Tokugawa government about to collapse, it would be a disgrace if no one is willing to go down with it. That is why I must go. I will fight the best battle of my life to die for the country.

In October 1868, Hijikata and Ōtori Keisuke led Shogunate forces to occupy the fortress of Goryōkaku in the Battle of Hakodate, and continued to eliminate local resistance. When the short-lived Ezo Republic was founded in December, Hijikata was made a Deputy Defence Minister (Vice-minister of the Army). Imperial troops continued to attack by land and sea.

On May 6, 1869, Hijikata led a daring but doomed raid to steal the imperial warship Kōtetsu in the Battle of Miyako Bay, in the early morning, a number of oppositionists managed to board the ship via the Kaiten warship, but Kōtetsu repelled the attack and mowed them down with a Gatling gun. Many others including the captain of Kaiten were also killed by gunfire from the Imperial ships. The battle lasted only thirty minutes; Hijikata, the survivors and the Kaiten retreated to Hakodate.

Later on the fourth week of May 1869, Hijikata led the 230-strong Republic of Ezo forces and the surviving Shinsengumi against 600 strong Imperial forces during the Battle of Futamata for sixteen hours and were forced to retreat. The Imperial forces attacked again on the next day, only to retreat. On the following night, Hijikata led a successful raid on the Imperial forces' camp, forcing them to flee. Hijikata and the forces later retreated to Hakodate on June 10.

=== Death ===
During the Battle of Hakodate, the final battle of the Boshin War, Hijikata summoned his 16-year-old page, Ichimura Tetsunosuke on June 14 (lunar calendar May 5), 1869, to a private room in an inn. There, he entrusted Ichimura with a death poem, his katana, a letter, a photograph of himself, and several strands of his hair. Ichimura was instructed to bear them to the home of Hijikata's brother-in-law Satō Hikogorō in Hino. The death poem entrusted to Ichimura reads:

Though my body may decay on the island of Ezo, my spirit guards my lord in the East.

In the final conflict of the revolution, on June 20 (lunar calendar May 11), 1869, Hijikata was killed near the Ippongi Kanmon (一本木関門) by a bullet that shattered his lower back while leading his troops on horseback. His body was later claimed by Koshiba Chōnosuke and others.

Three days later on June 23 (lunar calendar May 14), 1869, a group of surviving Shinsengumi members under the last commander Sōma Kazue surrendered at Benten Daiba. A week after Hijikata's death, the Goryōkaku fortress was taken and all military forces of the Ezo Republic surrendered to the Meiji government on June 27, 1869, marking the end of Boshin War.

It is unknown where Hijikata was buried but it is believed that his body was laid to rest either at Goryōkaku, Hekketsuhi or Ganjoji.

== Grave memorials and monuments ==
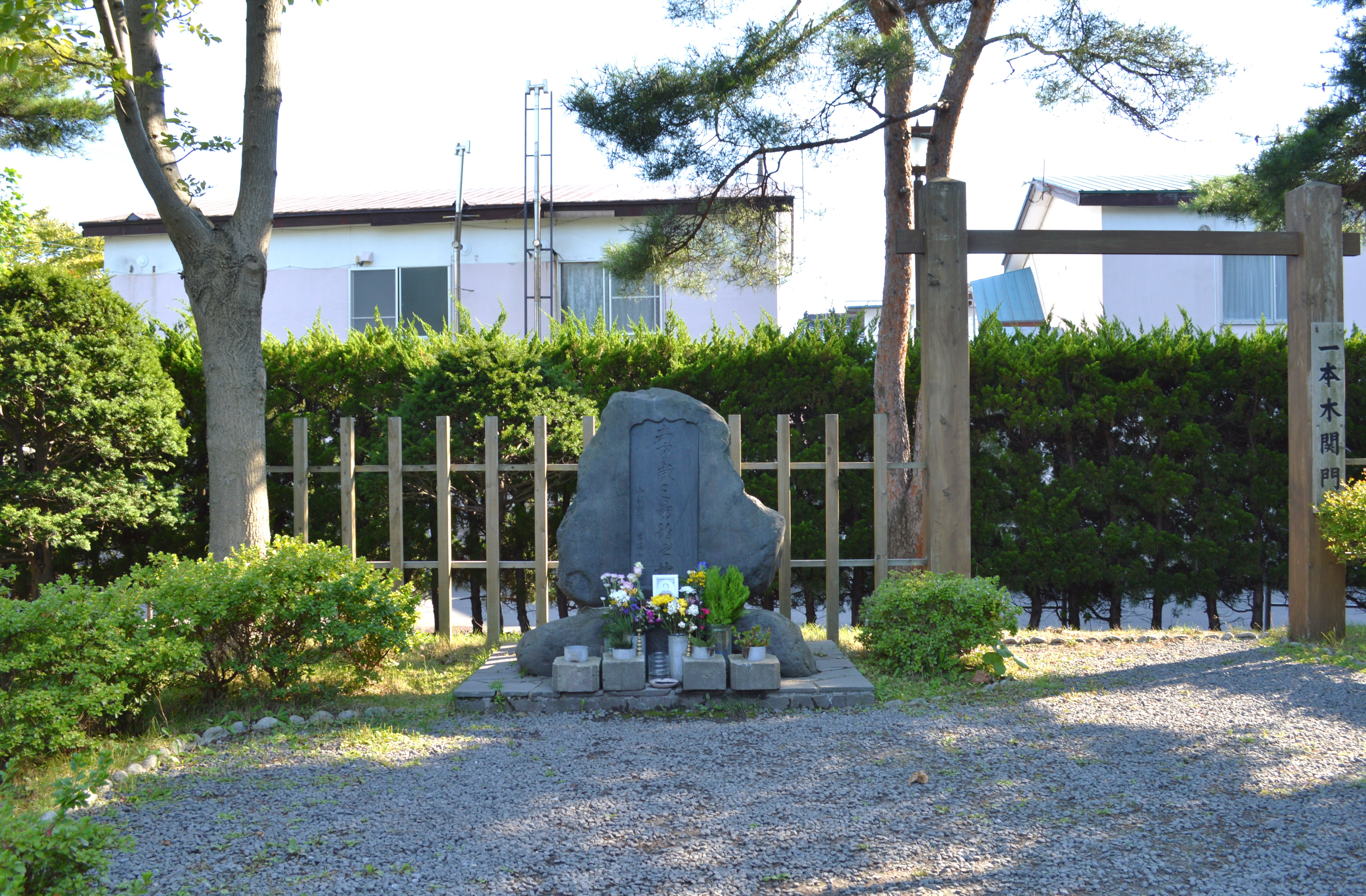
The oldest grave memorial of Hijikata Toshizo in Hakodate

The first grave memorial of Hijikata was at Wakamatsu-chō, Hakodate, where he was killed, near the reconstructed Ippongi Kanmon in the present day compound of the Hakodate Welfare Centre.

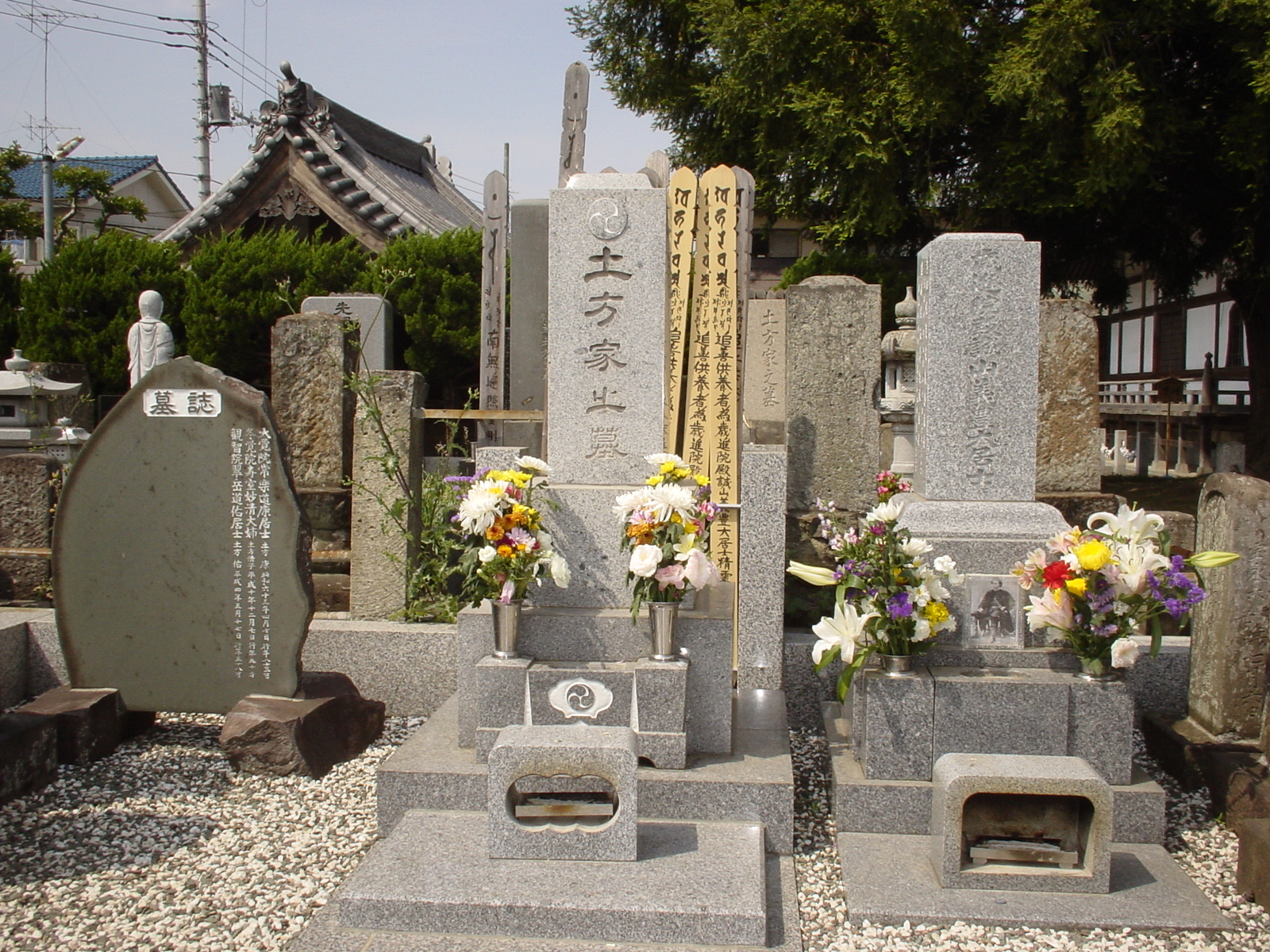
Grave memorial of Hijikata family (Hijikata Toshizō's on the right) at Sekidenji, Hino, Tokyo, Japan

A grave memorial of Hijikata was also erected at Sekidenji temple in Hino, Tokyo, Japan.

Other grave memorials were located at Shōmyōji (Hakodate, Hokkaido), Tenneji (Aizuwakamatsu), Jutokuji (Kita, Tokyo), Entsūji (Kita, Tokyo), etc.

A monument known as Hekketsuhi, was erected at Hakodate in memory of about 800 people, including Hijikata, who died during the Boshin War.

In 1875, Nagakura Shinpachi, with the help of Matsumoto Ryōjun, Saito Hajime, and several other surviving former Shinsengumi members, erected the monument known as the Grave of Shinsengumi for Kondō Isami, Hijikata Toshizō, and the fallen comrades of the Shinsengumi at Jutoku-ji temple boundary in Itabashi, near Itabashi Station in Tokyo.

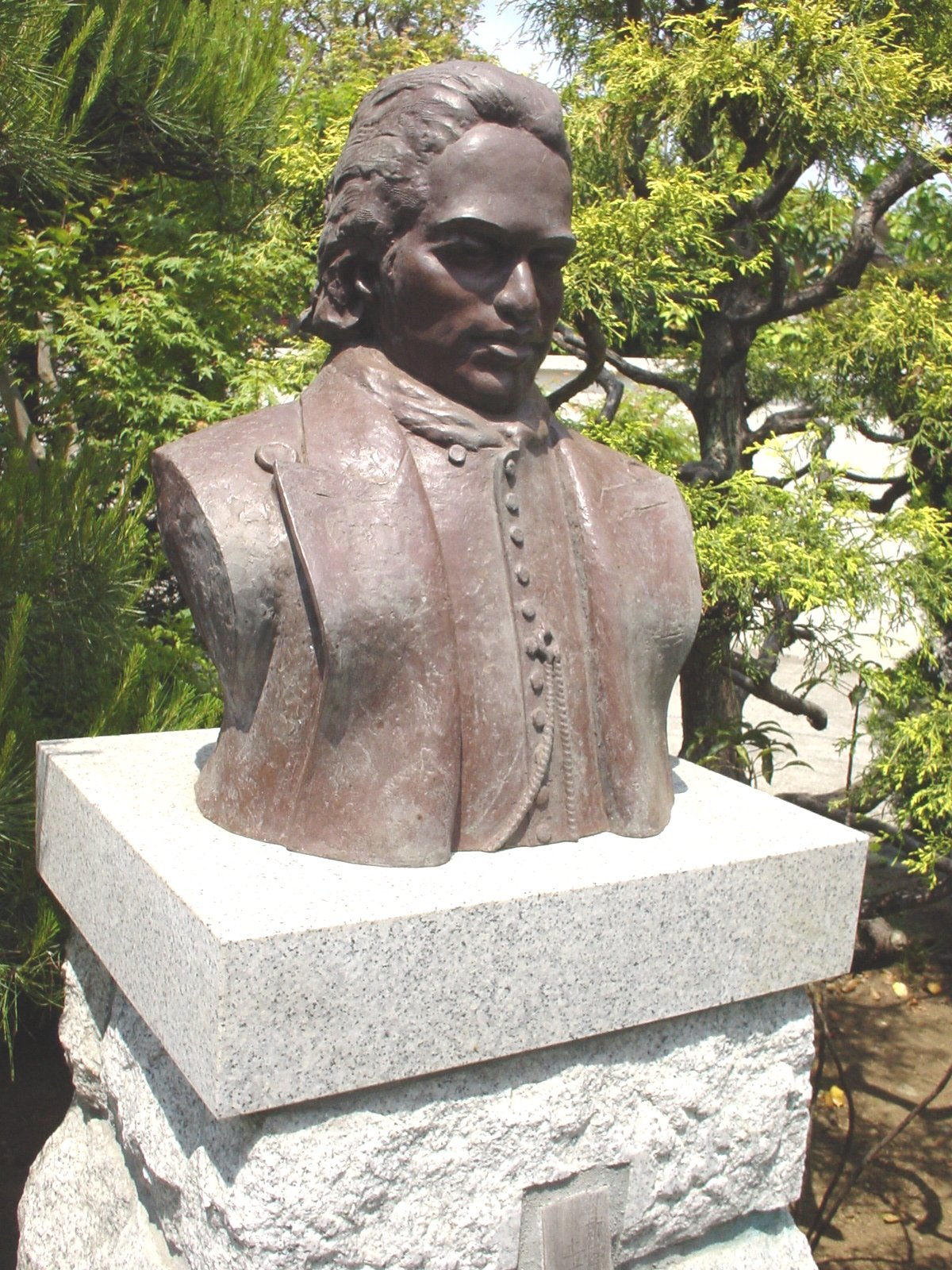
Hijikata bust near the Hijikata Toshizō Museum, Takahata Fudo, Hino, Tokyo

The Hijikata Toshizō Museum was later established in 1994 near the Sekidenji temple.

== In popular culture ==
The Shinsengumi have become a popular subject for films, television, and manga and anime, ranging from historical drama to comedy and romance. As a leader of the group, Hijikata is usually a prominent character in such productions.

The novel Moeyo Ken, written by Ryōtarō Shiba, is a dramatization of Hijikata's life. The novel was adapted into a film in 1966 and a television series in 1970 where Hijikata was played by Asahi Kurizuka. Adapted from the same novel in the 2021 film Baragaki: Unbroken Samurai, Hijikata was played by Junichi Okada, a member of Japanese boy band V6.

Hijikata is depicted in the 1999 film Gohatto ("Taboo") (played by Takeshi Kitano) and the 2013 NHK Taiga drama Yae no Sakura (played by Jun Murakami). He was also played by Koji Yamamoto in both the 2004 NHK Taiga drama series Shinsengumi! (including the single-episode sequel Shinsengumi!: Hijikata Toshizo Saigo no Ichinichi) and 2015 morning drama series Asa ga Kita. He is the protagonist in Morita Kenji's manga Getsumei Seiki, and in Mibu Robin's Baragaki ("Red Demon").

He is also featured in a number of other anime and manga series, including Gintama (an inspired character named Hijikata Tōshirō 土方 十四郎), Peacemaker Kurogane, Intrigue in the Bakumatsu - Irohanihoheto, Ghost Slayers Ayashi (as a child, with a brief glimpse of his future death); Kaze Hikaru, Shura no Toki, Hell Girl, Soar High! Isami (inspired character: Toshi Tsukikage) and the popular otome game/anime series Hakuouki: Shinsengumi Kitan. Hijikata is also a supporting character in Shin Teito Monogatari, the prequel to the bestselling historical fantasy novel Teito Monogatari (Hiroshi Aramata). In the manga and anime, Drifters, Hijikata serves as one of the antagonists, who holds hatred to the protagonist, Shimazu Toyohisa, because he is an ancestor of the Shimazu clan he fought. He is also a main character in the manga Golden Kamuy, having been secretly imprisoned in Abashiri Prison instead of killed. Hijikata appears in the 2014 historical fiction novel The Soldier and the Samurai.(ISBN 1500183059) In 2024, the story of Hijikata served as a backdrop for the 27th Detective Conan movie The Million-Dollar Pentagram. Hijikata is a antagonist in anime series Ao no Miburo.

Hijikata is one of the main characters in the 2014 video game Ryū ga Gotoku Ishin!, voiced by Nakamura Shidō II. He has the visual likeness of previous series antagonist Yoshitaka Mine.

Hijikata appeared in the 2024 drama "With You I Bloom: The Shinsengumi Youth Chronicle" based on the 1963 Shinsengumi manga by Osamu Tezuka. He was portrayed by Shogo Sakamoto.

Hijikata was also portrayed in the drama series “Song of the samurai” by actor Yuki Yamada, telling the story of his rise to vice-commander of the shinsegumi.
