= Kondō Isami =

Japanese swordsman (1834–1868)

- 近藤 勇
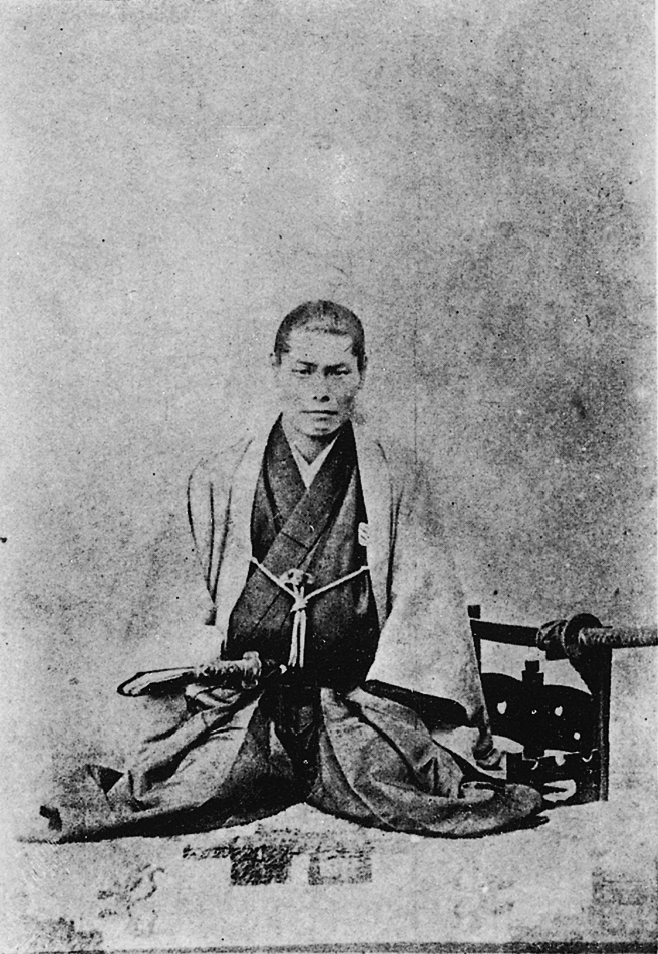

Shinsengumi Commander
- In office 1863–1868
- Preceded by: none (Briefly, office held jointly with Serizawa Kamo and Niimi Nishiki)

Personal details
- Born: Miyagawa Katsugorō; November 9, 1834 Kamiishihara Village, Musashi Province, Tokugawa Shogunate
- Died: May 17, 1868 (aged 33) Itabashi execution grounds, Itabashi, Edo, Japan
- Cause of death: Decapitation
- Resting place: body: Ryugenji Temple, Osawa, Mitaka, Tokyo, Japan head: Hozoji Temple, Okazaki, Aichi Prefecture, Japan
- Spouse: Matsui Tsune (m. 1860–1868)
- Domestic partner(s): Miyuki; Oko
- Relations: Kondō Shūsuke (adoptive father); Kondō Fude (adoptive mother); Kondō Hisatarō (grandson)
- Children: Kondō Tama (daughter); Oyu (daughter), with Oko
- Parents: Miyagawa Hisajirō (father); Miyagawa Miyo (mother)
- Relatives: Miyagawa Rie (sister); Miyagawa Otogorō (brother); Miyagawa Sōbei (brother); Kondō Yūgorō (nephew)
- Known for: Commander of Shinsengumi
- Other names: Shimazaki Katsuta; Shimazaki Isami Fujiwara no Yoshitake
- Alias: Okubo Tsuyoshi; Okubo Yamato

Military service
- Allegiance: Tokugawa bakufu
- Branch/service: Rōshigumi (former); Mibu Rōshigumi (former); Shinsengumi
- Years of service: 1863–1868
- Rank: Wakadoshiyori
- Commands: Mibu Rōshigumi (former); Shinsengumi
- Battles/wars: Ikedaya incident Kinmon incident Second Chōshū expedition Boshin War: Battle of Toba–Fushimi; Battle of Kōshū-Katsunuma

Kondō Isami (近藤 勇; November 9, 1834 – May 17, 1868) was a Japanese swordsman and samurai of the late Edo period. He was the fourth generation master of Tennen Rishin-ryū and was famed for his role as commander of the Shinsengumi.

== Background ==
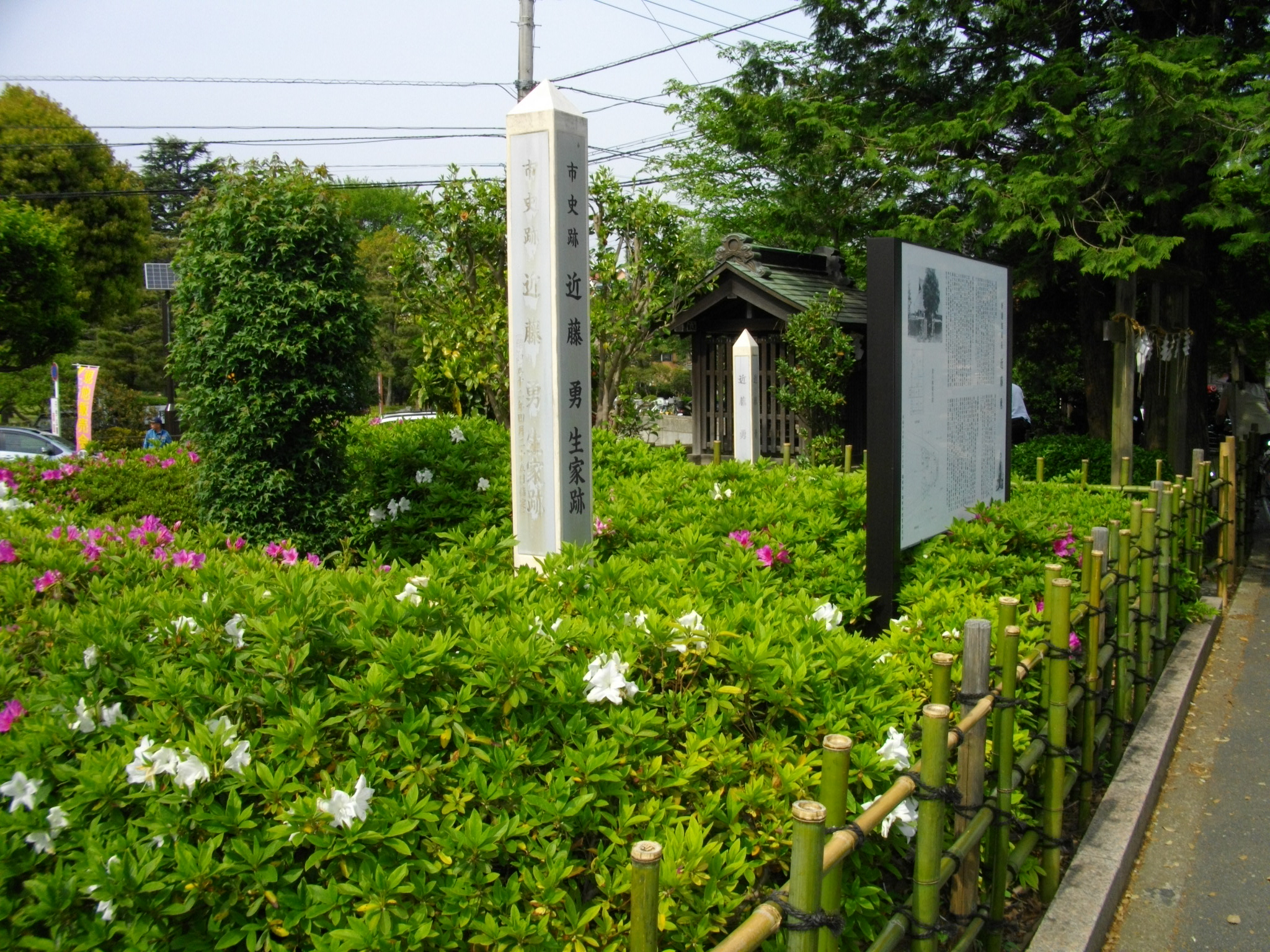
Birthplace of Kondo Isami in Chōfu

He was born Miyagawa Katsugorō to a farmer Miyagawa Hisajirō and his wife Miyo in Kami-Ishihara village in Musashi Province (present city of Chōfu) in Western Tokyo on November 9, 1834. He had two older brothers, Otojirō (音次郎; later known as Otogorō 音五郎) and Kumezō (粂蔵; later known as Sōbei 惣兵衛) and an older sister Rie (リエ), who died two years before he was born. Katsugorō began training at the Shieikan (the main dojo of the Tennen Rishin-ryū) in 1848.

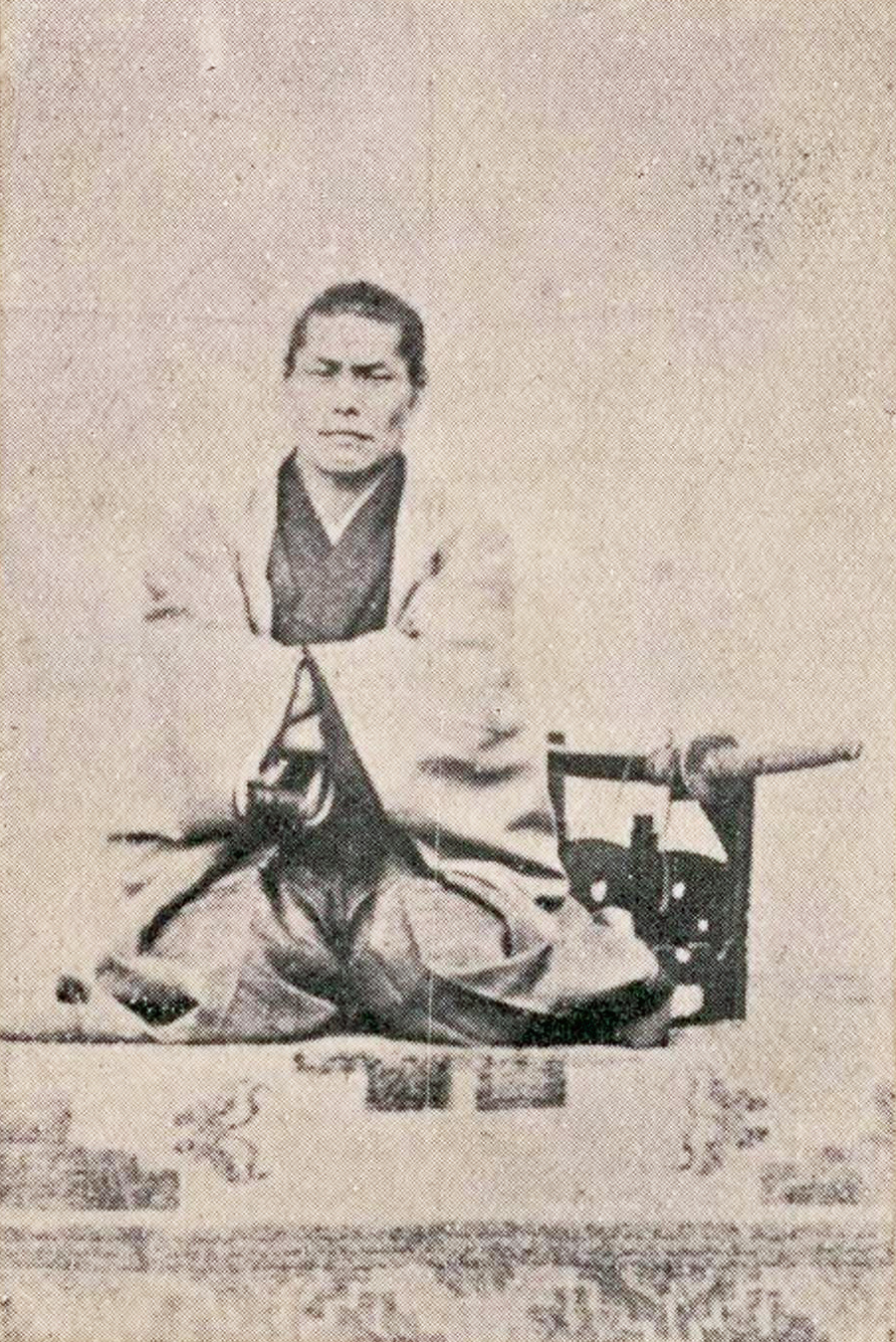
Kondo Isami (1834–1868)

As a young man he was said to be an avid reader, and especially liked the stories of the Forty-seven rōnin and the Romance of the Three Kingdoms. His renown as a scholar and his fame at having defeated a group of thieves who tried to break into his family home was great, and caught the attention of Kondō Shūsuke, the third generation master of the Tennen Rishin-ryū. Shūsuke wasted no time in adopting the young Katsugorō in 1849, who first took the name of Shimazaki Katsuta (島崎勝太). According to a record in the possession of the former Gozu-tennōsha Shrine 牛頭天王社 (now the Hino Yasaka-jinja Shrine 日野八坂神社), Katsuta is listed, with full common name and formal name, as Shimazaki Isami Fujiwara (no) Yoshitake (島崎勇藤原義武), and thus, had the name Isami (勇) as of 1858, the document's date.

Kondō was said to have owned a katana called "Kotetsu" (虎徹), the work of the 17th century swordsmith Nagasone Kotetsu. However, the authenticity of his "Kotetsu" is highly debatable. According to Yasu Kizu's pamphlet on the swordmaker Kotetsu, Kondō's sword may actually have been made by Minamoto no Kiyomaro, a swordmaker of high repute roughly contemporary to Kondō.

Kondō married Matsui Tsune in 1860. This was an advantageous match for Kondō as Otsune was the daughter of Matsui Yasogorō (松井八十五郎), a retainer to the Shimizu-Tokugawa clan. On September 30, 1861, Isami became the fourth generation master (sōke no yondai me 宗家四代目) of Tennen Rishin-ryū, assuming the name Kondō Isami and taking charge of the Shieikan. A year later, his daughter Kondō Tama (1862–1886) was born.

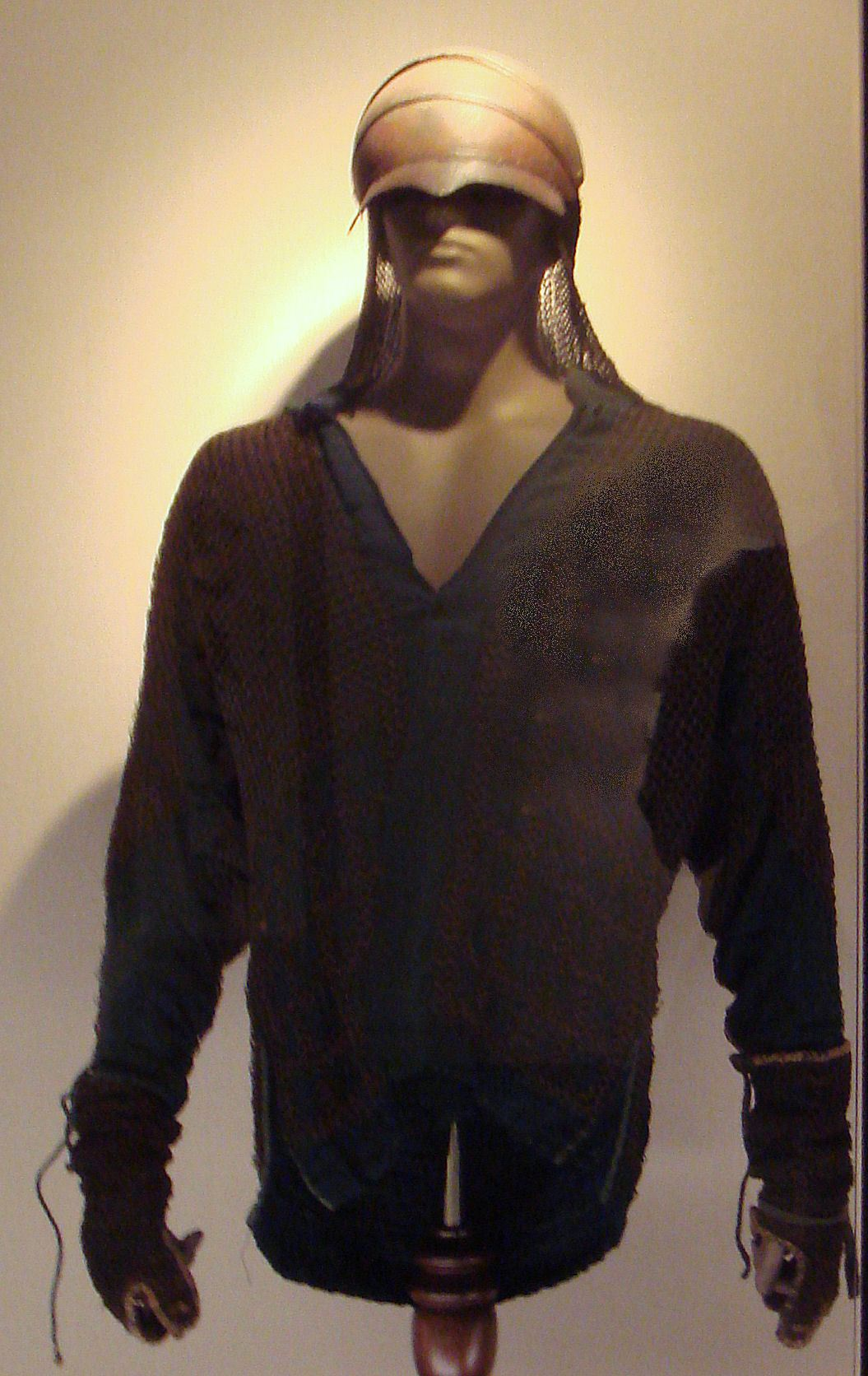
A kusari-katabira (chainmail) and hachi-gane (forehead protector) used by Kondō Isami

Although he was never employed by the Shogunate before his Shinsengumi days, Kondō was a candidate for a teaching position at the Kōbusho in 1862. The Kobusho was an exclusive military training school, primarily for the use of the shogunal retainers, set up by the Shogunate in 1855 in order to reform the military system after the arrival of Perry's Black Ships.

== Shinsengumi period ==
In 1863, the Tokugawa shogunate organized a massive group of rōnin for the purpose of protecting the shōgun Iemochi during his time in Kyoto. Kondō joined the unit, which became known as the Rōshigumi, with his close friend Hijikata Toshizō, as well as Shieikan's members and guests Yamanami Keisuke, Okita Sōji, Harada Sanosuke, Nagakura Shinpachi, Tōdō Heisuke, and Inoue Genzaburō. After the de facto commander Kiyokawa Hachirō revealed their true purpose as being Imperial supporters, the Rōshigumi was disbanded and most of the members returned to Edo. Kondō, Hijikata, former Mito retainer Serizawa Kamo, and a handful of others remained in Kyoto and formed the Mibu Rōshigumi. Acting under the direct orders of the shogunate, Matsudaira Katamori of Aizu undertook supervision of these men. Under the oversight of Aizu, acting in its role as Protector of Kyoto, they worked as police in the imperial capital.

On August 18, his unit was given the name Shinsengumi. In July 1864, the Shinsengumi became well known for arresting a cell of shishi (the incident was known as the Ikedaya Jiken, or Ikedaya Affair).

Kondō later had at least two mistresses in Kyoto, Miyuki and Oko, who were both geishas, with the latter he had an illegitimate daughter named Oyu, who would later become a geisha as well at Gion.

On July 10, 1867, Kondō became a hatamoto, along with the rest of the Shinsengumi.

== Boshin War ==
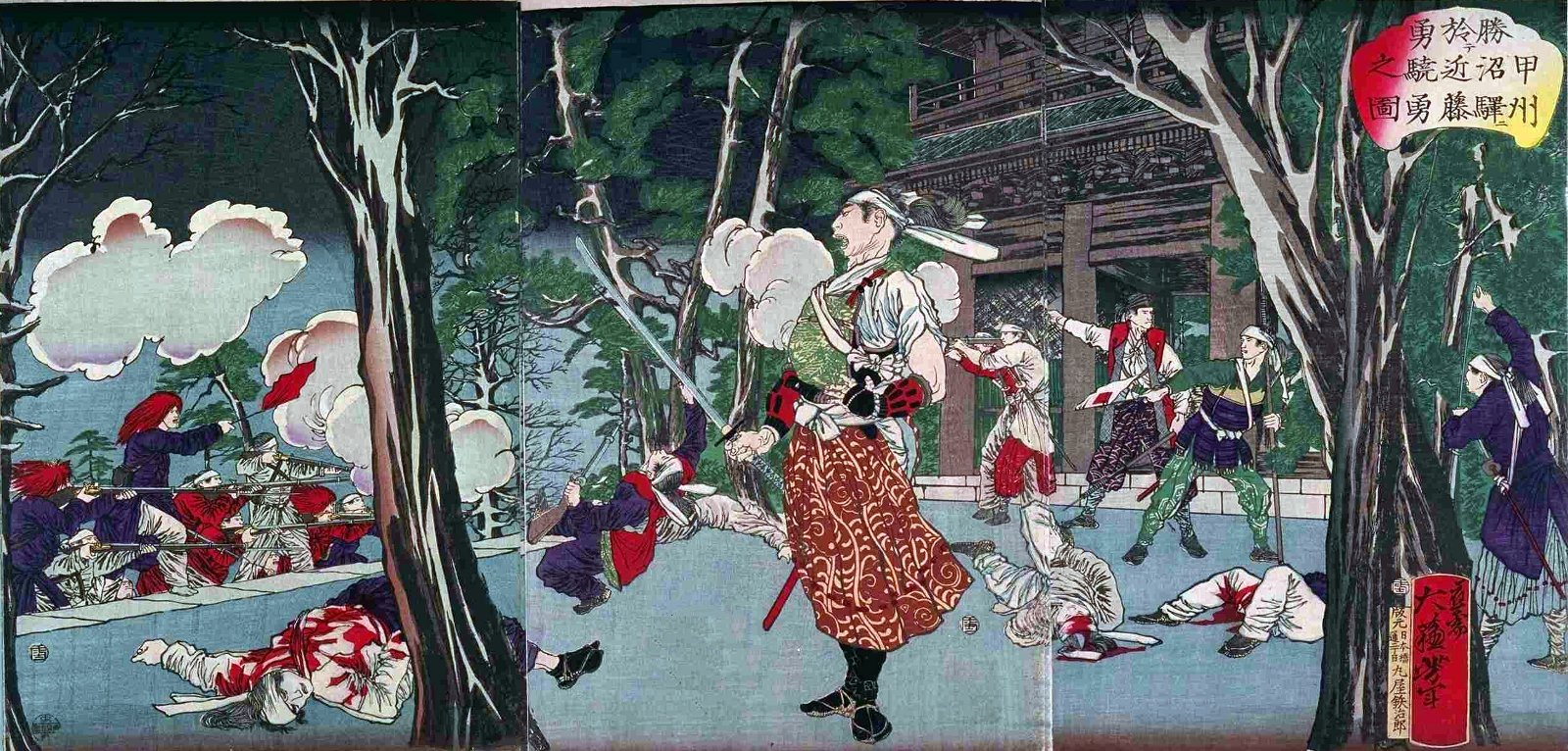
Kondō Isami at the Battle of Kōshū-Katsunuma

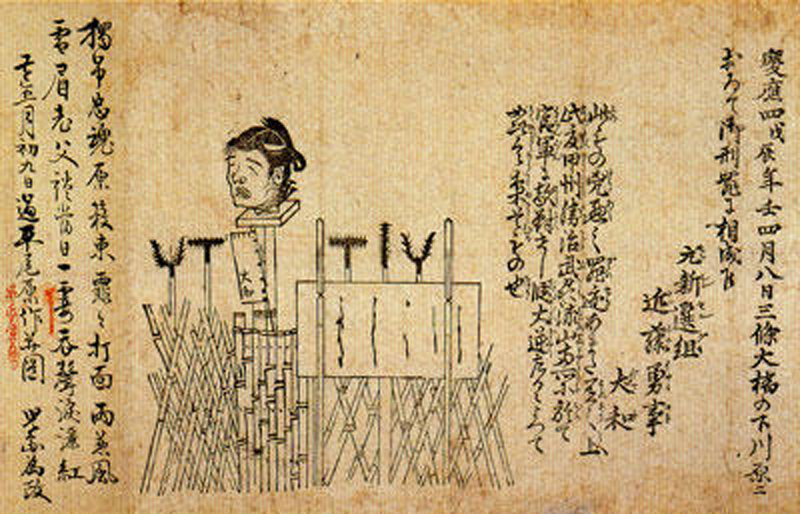
The public display of Kondō Isami's head after his decapitation. 1868 newspaper.

After suffering a gunshot wound at the Battle of Toba–Fushimi in January 1868, Kondō returned to Edo. There he met with the military commander Katsu Kaishū and was promoted to the rank of wakadoshiyori (wakadoshiyori-kaku 若年寄格) in the rapidly disintegrating Tokugawa administration. Kondō created a new unit, Kōyō Chinbutai (甲陽鎮撫隊, Pacification Corps), based on the surviving remnants of the Shinsengumi and led them under the alias of Okubo Tsuyoshi. They departed from Edo for Kōfu Castle on March 24 on orders to suppress uprisings there. Upon receiving news on March 28 that Kōfu Castle had been taken by Imperial Court forces led by Itagaki Taisuke, they settled at a town of Katsunuma five miles east of Kōfu.

On March 29, 1868, Kondō and his unit were attacked by the Imperial forces at the Battle of Kōshū-Katsunuma, holding out for about two hours but ultimately losing. They narrowly escaped from the battle and retreated to Edo.

On April 11, 1868, Kondō, Hijikata and their unit departed Edo again and set up temporary headquarters at the Kaneko family estate, northeast of Edo. Kondō later changed his alias from Okubo Tsuyoshi to Okubo Yamato.

Later on April 25, 1868, they moved to a new headquarters in Nagareyama.

== Execution ==
While training at Nagareyama on April 26, 1868, Kondo and his unit were caught by surprise by Imperial forces. The vice-chief of staff Arima Tota of Satsuma Domain suspected that "Okubo Yamato" was Kondō himself, and ordered him brought back to the Imperial forces camp at Koshigaya. Kondō was then taken to Itabashi on April 27, 1868, for questioning. On the same day Hijikata went to Edo to see Katsu Kaishū and asked for his help in getting a pardon for Kondō. The following day, April 28, a messenger arrived at Itabashi with a letter seemingly written by Katsu requesting that Kondō's life be spared. However, the messenger was arrested and the request was denied.

Kondō was put on trial on April 30, 1868, and declared guilty. As a result, Kondō was beheaded by the executioner Yokokura Kisoji at the Itabashi execution grounds on May 17, 1868. Among the crowd witnessing his execution was his nephew Miyagawa Yūgorō. Kondō's head was put on a pike for public display.

Three days later on May 20, 1868, Kondō's body was claimed by his nephew to be taken back to Osawa, Edo to be buried, while his head was salted and moved to Kyoto, where it was displayed on a pike on Sanjō Ōhashi.

While on display on the bridge, Kondō's head was taken away by Saitō Hajime, who would later ask the priest Sonku Giten to hold a memorial service for him. The head was taken by the priest when he moved to Okazaki, Aichi Prefecture, and buried in a small mound behind the Hozoji temple.

According to Tani Tateki (1837–1911) of the Tosa Domain, Kondō was arrested and executed by the new government (formed mostly by samurai from Chōshū han and Satsuma han) as a direct result of being accused of the assassination of Sakamoto Ryōma. Tani continued to insist that Kondō was responsible for the killing even after former Mimawarigumi member Imai Nobuo confessed in 1870.

== Grave memorials ==
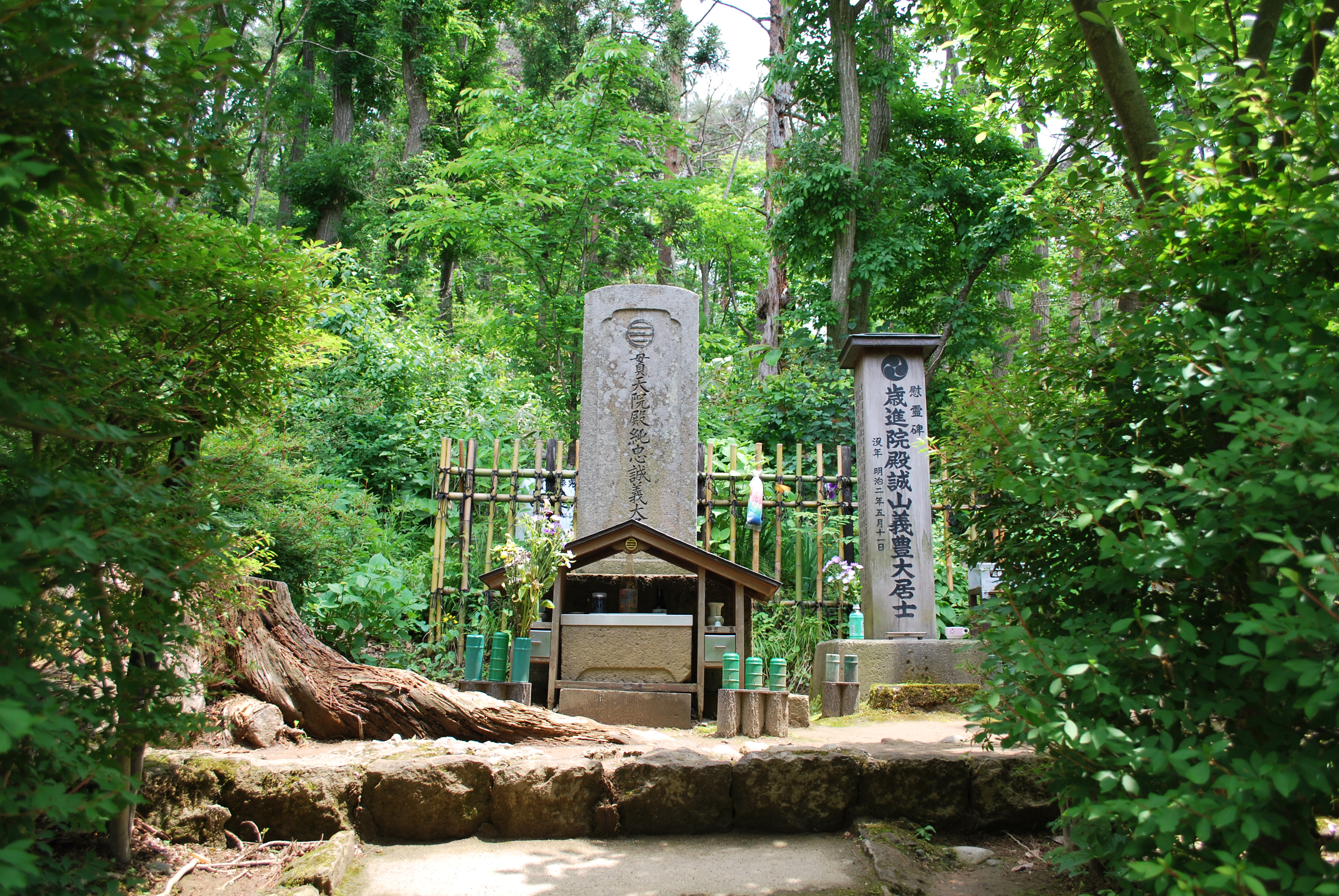
Kondo Isami's memorial grave in Aizu

Kondō has at least four grave sites; it is believed that the first of them was the grave erected at Ten'nei-ji Temple (天寧寺) in Aizu by Hijikata Toshizō. Hijikata, was convalescing nearby from an injury sustained at the Battle of Utsunomiya, brought Kondō's hair there and was said to have personally supervised the preparation and construction of the site. Kondō's funerary name, Kanten'inden'junchūseigi-daikōji (貫天院殿純忠誠義大居士) is believed to have been granted by Matsudaira Katamori.

Another grave site is located at Ryugenji Temple in Osawa, Mitaka, Tokyo where his body was brought by his nephew and buried with his family.

A grave mound containing Kondō's head is located behind the Hozoji temple in Okazaki, Aichi Prefecture, Japan.

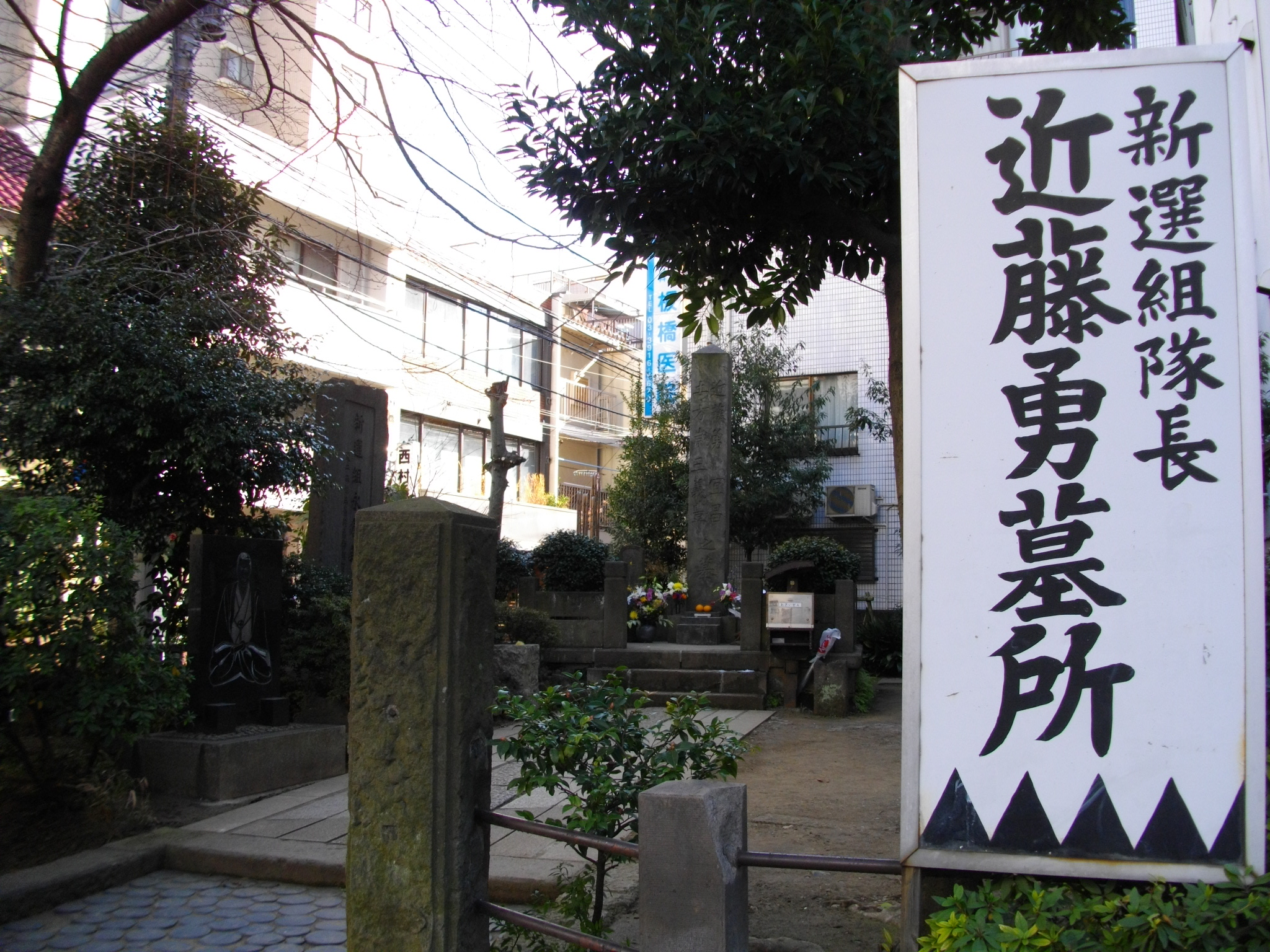
Isami Kondo's memorial grave at Graves of Shinsengumi in Itabashi

Another grave is located on the memorial known as Grave of Shinsengumi, in front of Itabashi Station near the location of former Itabashi execution grounds. It was erected in 1875 by Nagakura Shinpachi, with the help of Matsumoto Ryōjun and several surviving former Shinsengumi members including Saitō Hajime. It memorializes Kondō and Hijikata Toshizō.

== Legacy ==
In 1876, Kondō's 14-year-old daughter Kondō Tama married his nephew Miyagawa Yūgorō, who succeed him as a fifth generation master of Tennen Rishin-ryū and took the name of Kondō Yūgorō. Kondō Yūgorō established his own dojo, Hatsuunkan, in Kami-ishihara (present day Chōfu, Tokyo). Tama and Yūgorō's only child, a son named Kondō Hisatarō, was born in 1883. Kondō Tama died three years later in 1886 and Yūgorō later remarried at least twice.

In 1905, Kondō Hisatarō was killed in action in the Russo-Japanese War at the age of 22. This marked the end of the Kondō Isami bloodline.

In kōdan narratives of the Meiji era, when accounts of the Shinsengumi were often confused and contradictory, the group was frequently portrayed as the villains who assassinated Sakamoto Ryōma. In contrast, Kondō was often presented as an exceptional warrior of remarkable valor.。

== In fiction ==
Kondō Isami is often depicted in fiction, across different media, including television, film, books, anime, and manga.

The NHK Taiga drama Shinsengumi! depicted the life of Kondō.

Kondō Isao from Gintama is roughly based on him. He also appears in the video-game-turned-anime series Hakuouki Shinsengumi Kitan. Kondō also makes appearances in the series Kaze Hikaru and Peacemaker Kurogane, among others. Kondō is briefly mentioned in the anime series Soar High! Isami by the main characters' ancestors who are also members of the Shinsengumi. The female protagonist of the series, Isami Hanaoka, is named after and based on him. He is briefly shown in the anime Golden Kamuy. Kondō is portrayed by and modelled after Eiichiro Funakoshi in the video game Ryu ga Gotoku Ishin!, serving as a major character in the plot of the game. In the remake, Like a Dragon: Ishin!, he is instead voiced by Akio Otsuka and has the likeness of Koichi Adachi, a character from Yakuza: Like A Dragon.

Kondō Isami appeared in Rurouni Kenshin: The Beginning in 2021. He was portrayed by Takahiro Fujimoto.

Kondō Isami appeared in Record of Ragnarok: Season 2. Kondō is depicted as one of humanity's greatest warriors; sent to fight the mythological Gods for the fate of humanity.

Kondō Isami appeared in the 2024 drama "With You I Bloom: The Shinsengumi Youth Chronicle" based on the 1963 Shinsengumi manga by Osamu Tezuka. He was portrayed by Akira Takano.

== Links ==
- SHINSENGUMI 新選組 Shinsengumi Website
