= Okita Rintarō =

Japanese swordsman (1826-1883)

- 沖田 林太郎
- Born: Inoue Rintarō (井上 林太郎); March 30, 1826; Hino, Edo, Japan
- Died: February 13, 1883 (aged 56); Tokyo, Japan
- Spouse: Okita Mitsu (m. 1846–1883)
- Children: 2 sons, 2 daughters
- Relatives: Inoue Sōzō (brother); Okita Katsujiro (adoptive father); Okita Kin (adopted sister); Okita Sōji (adopted brother/in-law)
- Military career
- Allegiance: Tokugawa bakufu Shōnai Domain
- Branch: Rōshigumi (former); Shinchōgumi
- Service years: 1863–1869
- Rank: kumigashira (組頭, commander)
- Commands: Shinchōgumi
- Conflicts: Boshin War

Okita Rintarō (沖田 林太郎) (born Inoue Rintarō (井上 林太郎); March 30, 1826 – February 13, 1883) was a Japanese samurai of the late Edo period who was a kumigashira (組頭, commander) of the Shinchōgumi (the Shinsengumi's counterpart in Edo).

== Biography ==
Born Inoue Rintarō (井上 林太郎) in Hino, Edo in 1826, he was Inoue Sōzō's younger brother and related to Inoue Genzaburō's family. He later became an adopted son of Okita Katsujirō (Okita Sōji's father) and changed his name to Okita Rintarō before his marriage to Katsujirō's daughter Mitsu in 1846 (Kōka 3). He then served as the head of the Okita family in place of Sōji.

A licensed practitioner of the Tennen Rishin Ryu, in 1863 he joined the Rōshigumi together with Okita Sōji and Inoue Genzaburō. However, not long after their arrival in Kyoto, the Rōshigumi was disbanded, he and the rest went back to Edo, leaving behind Okita Sōji, Inoue Genzaburō and few members there. While in Edo, he later became a commander of the Shinchōgumi, which was under the sponsorship of the Shōnai-han. At that time, he and Mitsu moved to one of the barracks (kumi-yashiki 組屋敷) in the former Edo residence of Tanuma Okitaka with their children. They lived there until the Boshin War.

After the start of the Boshin War, he and Mitsu took care of a terminally ill Okita Sōji until the forces of the northern domains, as well as the soldiers of the former shogunate, retreated to the Tohoku region. Since Sōji was not fit for traveling, Rintarō and Mitsu had no choice but to leave him in Edo. Joining the Shōnai daimyō Sakai Tadazumi in leaving the city, Rintarō and his family traveled to Shōnai. Rintarō subsequently fought alongside the Shōnai forces during the height of the Boshin War. In 1872, the family returned to Tokyo and lived in a place called Ume-yashiki (梅屋敷; "Plum Mansion") in Sumida-Mukaijima. Okita Rintarō died in Tokyo, on February 13, 1883, at age 56.

== See also ==
- Okita Soji
- Inoue Genzaburō
