= Moto-Azabu =

District in Tokyo, Japan

Coordinates: 35.6544°N 139.7280°E

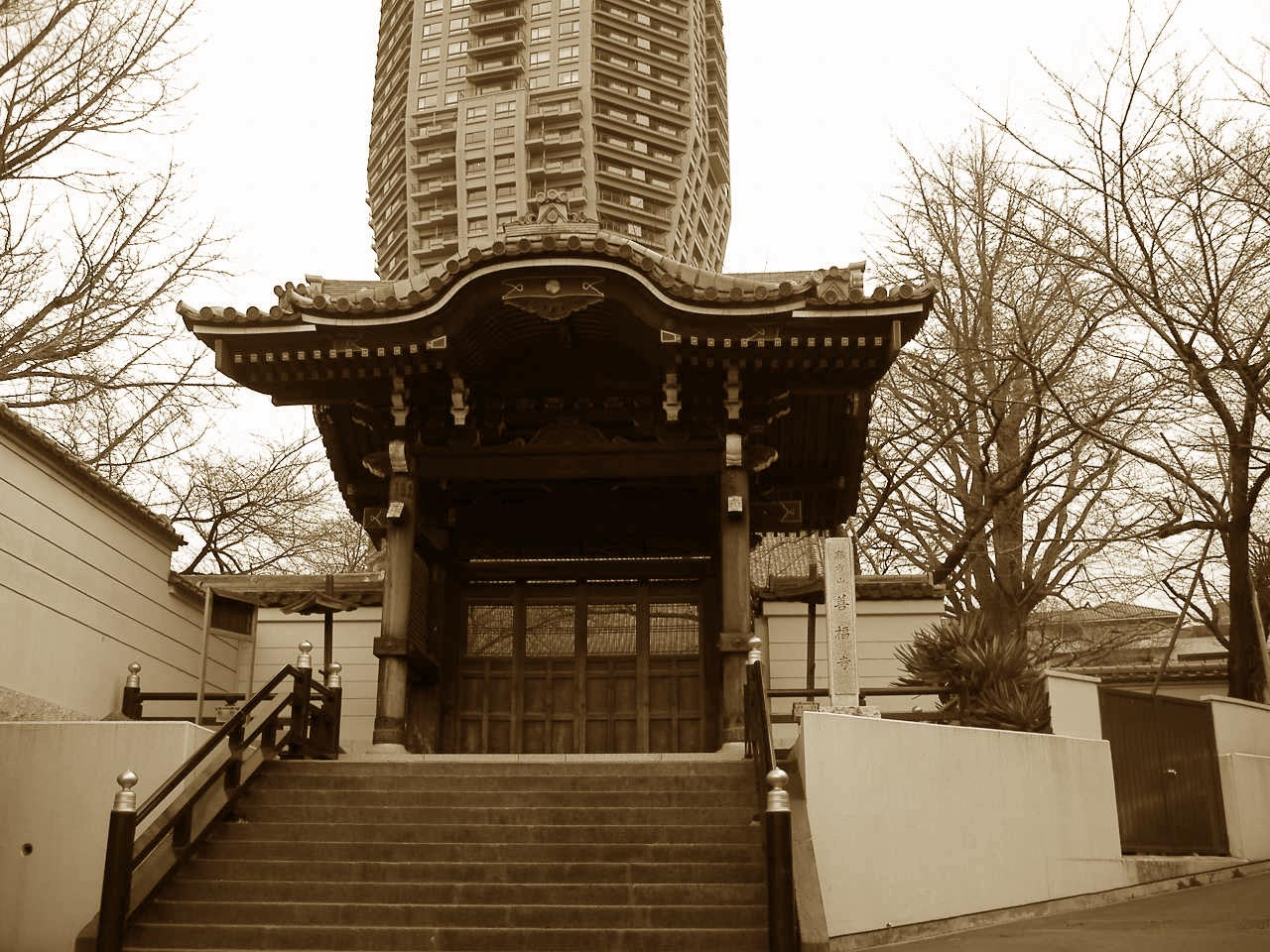
Zenpuku-ji

Moto-Azabu (元麻布) is a district of Minato, Tokyo, Japan.

The district is home to Zenpuku-ji, a Jōdo Shinshū temple also known as Azabu-san (麻布山). The embassy of China in Tokyo, and former embassy of Manchuria before World War II, are located in this area.

Moto-Azabu borders Nishi-Azabu on the west, Minami-Azabu on the south, Azabu-Jūban on the east, and Roppongi on the north.

== Education ==
Minato City Board of Education operates public elementary and junior high schools.

Moto-Azabu 1-chōme 1-4 ban, 2-chōme 5-6 and 11-13 ban, and 3-chōme 1-3 and 5-13 ban are zoned to Nanzan Elementary School (南山小学校). Moto-Azabu 1-chome 6-7 ban are zoned to Higashimachi Elementary School (東町小学校). Moto-Azabu 1-chōme 5-ban and 2-chōme 7-10 and 14 ban are zoned to Hommura Elementary School (本村小学校). Moto-Azabu 2-chōme 1-4 ban and 3-chōme 4-ban are zoned to Kogai Elementary School (笄小学校). The Nanzan and Higashimachi elementary zones feed into Roppongi Junior High School (六本木中学校). The Hommura and Kogai elementary zones feed into Koryo Junior High School (高陵中学校).

Azabu High School and the Minato Ward Nanzan elementary school, and Nishimachi International School are located in Moto-Azabu.

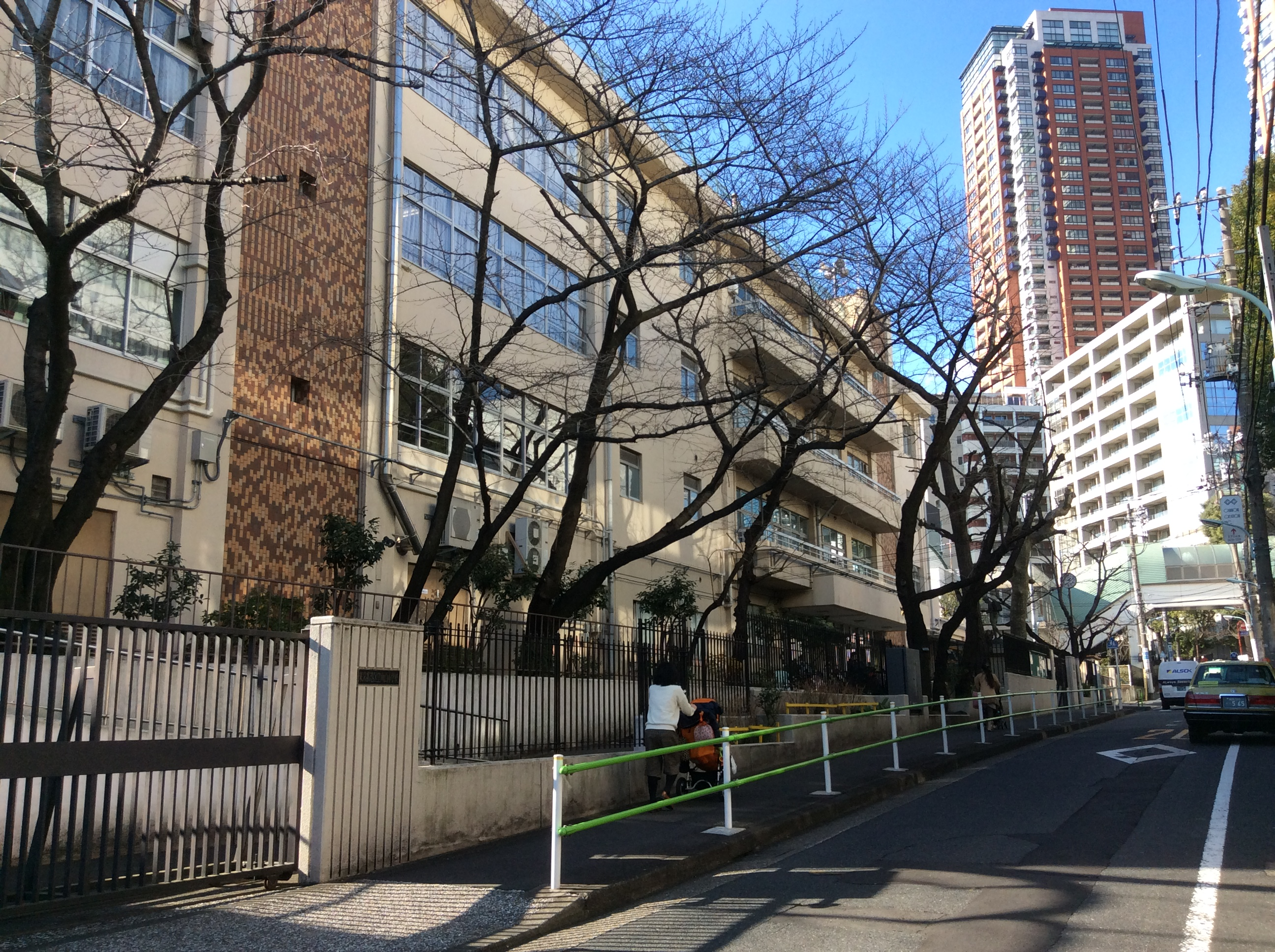
Nanzan Elementary School (南山小学校)
