= Kacem =

Kacem is a given name and a surname. Notable people with the name include:

== People with the given name Kacem ==
- Mouloud Kacem Naît Belkacem (1927–1992), Algerian politician, philosopher, historian, and writer
- Kacem Bouallouche (born 1963), Moroccan wrestler
- Kacem El Ghazzali (born 1990), Moroccan-Swiss secularist essayist and activist
- Abou El Kacem Hadji (born 1990), Algerian football player
- Kacem Kefi (1945–2018), Tunisian singer and composer
- Kacem Klifa (born 1940), Moroccan gymnast
- Kacem Slimani (1948–1996), Moroccan football defender

== People with the surname Kacem ==
- Mehdi Belhaj Kacem (born 1973), French-Tunisian actor, philosopher, and writer
- Mehdi Kacem, (born 1986), French-born Algerian football midfielder
- Rafiq Belhaj Kacem (born 1949), Tunisian politician
- Sonia Kacem (born 1985), Swiss-born artist

== See also ==
- Bab Sidi Kacem, one of the gates of the Medina of Tunis, the old capital of Tunisia
- Sidi Kacem, a city in Rabat-Salé-Kénitra, Morocco
- Sidi Kacem Province, province in the Moroccan economic region of Rabat-Salé-Kénitra
- Cacém (disambiguation)
- Kasam (disambiguation)
- Kasem (disambiguation)
- Kasim (disambiguation)
- Kassam (disambiguation)
- Kazem
- Qasam (disambiguation)
