= Hakuoki: Warrior Spirit of the Blue Sky =

- Kanji: 劇場版「薄桜鬼」第二章 士魂蒼宮
- Revised Hepburn: Gekijō-ban "Hakuoki" Dai-nishō Shikon Sōkyū
- Directed by: Osamu Yamasaki
- Written by: Osamu Yamasaki; Tsunekiyo Fujisawa
- Based on: Hakuoki by Otomate
- Produced by: Mitsutoshi Ogura; Yōhei Hayashi; Asuka Yamazaki; Jun Fukuda; Nobumitsu Urasaki; Hiroshi Nishijima
- Music by: Kenji Kawai
- Production companies: Studio Deen; NBCUniversal Entertainment Japan
- Distributed by: The Klockworx Co., Ltd.
- Release date: March 8, 2014
- Running time: 88 minutes
- Country: Japan
- Language: Japanese

Hakuoki: Warrior Spirit of the Blue Sky (Japanese: 劇場版「薄桜鬼」第二章 士魂蒼宮, Hepburn: Gekijō-ban "Hakuoki" Dai-nishō Shikon Sōkyū), is a 2014 Japanese animated historical fantasy romance action film based on the otome game series Hakuoki by Otomate. The film is the sequel to Hakuoki: Wild Dance of Kyoto and the last instalment of Hakuoki film series. The film serves as alternate retelling of the second season of the anime series. Like the anime series and the previous film, Aika Yoshioka provides the theme song titled "Sōkyū no Hata".

== Plot ==
After their loss at the battle of Toba-Fushimi, Chizuru and the Shinsengumi continues to fight against the Satsuma-Choshu alliance. During one of the battles, they are surprised to discover an army of Furies that able to move during daytime, forcing them to retreat. Disagreeing with the way Kondo fights, Harada and Shinpachi decides to leave Shinsengumi to fight their own way. The next night, during a night patrol, Sanan and Heisuke hunts down a Tosa Domain Furies that suddenly turned into ash. Amagiri reveals that each time Furies uses their powers, the shorter their lifespan becomes.

The Shinsengumi decides to move to Aizu before the Satsuma-Choshu forces attack, but Kondo decides to stay behind and surrender himself to buy some time for them to escape as he doesn't want to risk Hijikata's life. As planned, Kondo surrendered, allowing Chizuru and the Shinsengumi to escape, much to Hijikata's grief. Before moving to Aizu, Hijikata leaves Chizuru behind, not wanting to drag her into danger any longer. A month later, Chizuru heard that Kondo would be beheaded, so she departs to Aizu. On her way, she meets Okita who is on his way to rescue Kondo. Despite his condition, Okita still insists on going, but arrived too late to stop the execution. Chizuru meets Ryunosuke Ibuki, an old friend of the Shinsengumi, who then takes her to see Harada. Understanding Chizuru's wish to follow after Hijikata, Harada helps Chizuru passing through the Fury army by using himself as distraction with Shiranui's assistance and is eventually killed.

Chizuru falls from cliff on her way to Aizu, but is saved by Kazama. Together with Kazama, they head to Aizu, but make a stop at the remains of the village where the Yukimura clan used to live. Kaoru, revealed to be Chizuru's older twin brother, tries to convince Chizuru to join him and Kodo to get revenge on humans, but Chizuru's refusal leads her to be captured and taken to Nihonmatsu where Kodo is. Heisuke, who happens to be spying on the castle, rescue Chizuru from her cell. Sanan speaks with Kodo, who reveals his intention to build a Fury kingdom and was the one responsible for the destruction of the Yukimura clan so he can get Chizuru and use her to breed Fury-Demon children. Sanan protects Heisuke from Kodo's shot and dies, forcing Heisuke and Chizuru to handle the remaining Furies. Kodo made his escape, but is then killed by Kazama. After escaping the castle, Chizuru and Heisuke informs Saito about the incoming Fury army.

The next morning, Chizuru heads to Ezo where Hijikata is, while Saito and Heisuke stays to buy time for Hijikata's rally. During the battle, Heisuke used up all of his power and dies after protecting Saito. Okita then arrives to help and confronts Kaoru. Okita manage to kill Kaoru, but eventually succumbs to his illness and dies. Being the only one left standing, Saito drinks Water of Life to become a Fury and begins to fight the remaining enemies. Meanwhile, with Kazama's help, Chizuru reunites with Hijikata at Ezo. Realizing how much they want to be by each other's side, Hijikata and Chizuru professes their love for each other.

After the supply line to the fortress has been cut off, Hijikata and Chizuru departs to help. Hijikata is shot and heavily wounded, so Chizuru made him drank her blood to speed up his healing process. They uses a back route to return to Goryokaku, only to be confronted by Kazama who challenges Hijikata for a rematch. Hijikata accepts, starting a fierce fight between the two, with Hijikata emerging victorious. Acknowledging Hijikata as a true Demon, Kazama gives Hijikata a demon name, Hakuoki, and allows him to live his remaining life as he pleases. At the end of war, Hijikata remembers his deceased comrades and determines to live his remaining time together with Chizuru before following them.

== Voice cast ==
- Houko Kuwashima as Chizuru Yukimura
- Shinichiro Miki as Toshizō Hijikata
- Showtaro Morikubo as Sōji Okita
- Hiroyuki Yoshino as Heisuke Tōdō
- Koji Yusa as Sanosuke Harada
- Kousuke Toriumi as Hajime Saitō
- Kenjiro Tsuda as Chikage Kazama
- Tomohiro Tsuboi as Shinpachi Nagakura
- Toru Ohkawa as Isami Kondō
- Ryūgo Saito as Kodo Yukimura
- Hasumi Itō as Kaoru Nagumo
- Ryū Yamaguchi as Kyuju Amagiri
- Hiroaki Yoshida as Kyo Shiranui

== Reception ==
Travis Bruno from Capsule Computers gave the movie a positive review with score of 8. He once again praised the visuals and the performance of both the Japanese and English voice actors. He praised the film's focus on Chizuru, finding her interaction with the other main characters that gives the plot a "more stable ground to stand on" rather than trying to abruptly force everything on the viewer in the time allotted like in the previous film that makes a satisfying conclusion. He also praised with the way the villains are portrayed without much drama. However, he noted that the several time skips might throw off some people and disappointed that the soundtrack remains fairly simplistic despite the good animation.
