= Hakuoki: Wild Dance of Kyoto =

- Kanji: 劇場版「薄桜鬼」 〜京都乱舞〜
- Revised Hepburn: Gekijō-ban "Hakuoki" Kyoto Ranbu
- Directed by: Osamu Yamasaki
- Written by: Osamu Yamasaki; Tsunekiyo Fujisawa
- Based on: Hakuoki by Otomate
- Produced by: Mitsutoshi Ogura; Yōhei Hayashi; Asuka Yamazaki; Jun Fukuda; Nobumitsu Urasaki; Hiroshi Nishijima
- Music by: Kenji Kawai
- Production companies: Studio Deen; Geneon Universal Entertainment
- Distributed by: The Klockworx Co., Ltd.
- Release date: August 24, 2013
- Running time: 96 minutes
- Country: Japan
- Language: Japanese

Hakuoki: Wild Dance of Kyoto (Japanese: 劇場版「薄桜鬼」 〜京都乱舞〜, Hepburn: Gekijō-ban "Hakuoki" Kyoto Ranbu), is a 2013 Japanese animated historical fantasy action film based on the otome game series Hakuoki by Otomate. The film is the first instalment of Hakuoki duology film directed by Osamu Yamasaki and produced by Studio Deen. The film serves as alternate retelling of the first season of the anime series Hakuoki: Demon of the Fleeting Blossom. Aika Yoshioka returns to provide the theme song of the film titled "Kurenai no Ito" (紅ノ絲, lit. Crimson Thread). A sequel, titled Hakuoki: Warrior Spirit of the Blue Sky, was released in 2014.

== Plot ==
In 1864, Chizuru Yukimura is a young woman who went to Kyoto to look for her father, Kodo Yukimura. When she was chased by a pair of ronins, the ronins were killed by mad samurais with white hair and red eyes. She was saved by Toshizo Hijikata, Okita Souji, and Hajime Saito from the Shinsengumi. Chizuru is taken to the Shinsengumi headquarters for questioning. Upon learning that Chizuru is Kodo's daughter, the Shinsengumi chief Isami Kondo allows her to stay at Shinsengumi as Hijikata's page in exchange for her help in finding her father and keeping quiet about what she saw last night.

One night, Chizuru is sent as a messenger for the Shinsengumi, who are conducting an operation to apprehend the rebels. While protecting Okita, she is injured by a ronin working for the Satsuma, Chikage Kazama. Hijikata's arrival chased Kazama away. Returning to the compound, Chizuru finds her wound mysteriously healed with Hijikata secretly watching. The next night, Keisuke Sanan reveals to Chizuru about Rasetsu, humans who are turned into insane, bloodthirsty killers in exchange for enhanced strength and power after drinking Water of Life brought by Kodo. Desperate to heal his arm, Sanan drinks the vial to become a Rasetsu and nearly kills Chizuru, but Chizuru's inhuman power renders him unconscious. Hijikata questions Chizuru about her healing ability, but Chizuru herself knows nothing other than that she has had this ability since she was young. Hijikata agrees to keep her secret.

Soon, several Shinsengumi members who disagree with Kondo, leave the Shinsengumi with Kashitaro Itou, including two captains Hajime Saito and Heisuke Todo. Because of the lack of manpower, Kazama and his two companions Kyuju Amagiri and Kyo Shiranui attack the compound to kidnap Chizuru. Kazama reveals that they and Chizuru are descended from pureblooded Oni clans. However, the Shinsengumi's persistence and Chizuru's rejection forces Kazama to retreat.

Saito returns to Shinsengumi, revealed to have been a spy planted by Hijikata and Kondo to observe Itou's movement. Discovering Itou's plot to assassinate Kondo, the Shinsengumi kills Itou first, causing Itou's followers to swear vengeance, starting with Heisuke who is forced to become a Rasetsu to survive his fatal injuries. While the Shinsengumi are preparing for war against Satsuma and Choshu, Chizuru is escorted by Kaoru Nagumo to meet her father, only to learn that Kodo intends to create an army of Rasetsu to overthrow the government and restore the Yukimura clan that was annihilated years ago. Chizuru is saved by Hijikata, Saito, Sanosuke Harada, and Shinpachi Nagakura, forcing Kodo and Kaoru to retreat.

On his way back from a meeting, Kondo was shot by Itou's remaining followers. This prompts the desperate Okita, who is suffering from tuberculosis, to become a Rasetsu and kill the people responsible behind the shooting. Kaoru reveals himself to be the one who advised the attack and then shot Okita with silver bullets, preventing his injuries from healing.

During the Toba-Fushimi war, Chizuru and Genzaburo Inoue are tasked to get assistance from the Yodo clan, but discover the Yodo has betrayed them. Inoue is killed, but Hijikata arrives on time to save Chizuru. Kazama appears and reveals that Satsuma-Choshu alliance has become part of Imperial army, deeming the Shogunate, including the Shinsengumi as rebels. Kazama demands for Chizuru once more, leading to a fierce fight against Hijikata. Gravely injured, Hijikata drinks Water of Life and becomes a Rasetsu, allowing him to fight equally against Kazama. Their fight is stopped by Amagiri, forcing Kazama to leave. Hijikata and Chizuru are immediately surrounded by enemies, but Chizuru is not afraid as she and Hijikata fight together.

== Voice cast ==
- Houko Kuwashima as Chizuru Yukimura
- Shinichiro Miki as Toshizō Hijikata
- Showtaro Morikubo as Sōji Okita
- Hiroyuki Yoshino as Heisuke Tōdō
- Koji Yusa as Sanosuke Harada
- Kousuke Toriumi as Hajime Saitō
- Kenjiro Tsuda as Chikage Kazama
- Ryū Yamaguchi as Kyuju Amagiri
- Hiroaki Yoshida as Kyo Shiranui
- Tomohiro Tsuboi as Shinpachi Nagakura
- Toru Ohkawa as Isami Kondō
- Norio Kobayashi as Genzaburō Inoue
- Hasumi Ito as Kaoru Nagumo

== Reception ==
Travis Bruno from Capsule Computers gave the movie an average review with the score of 6,5. He praised visuals for its wide array of color usage that adds more details, especially for the main male characters. And even though the fighting scenes ended rather quickly, he still praised the way it's handled as it doesn't lessen the quality of the characters' detail during the scenes. He also praised the performance of both the Japanese and English voice actors.
