= Kasama =

Kasama may refer to:

- Kasama, Ibaraki, Japan
- Kasama, Zambia
- Kasama District, Zambia
- Kasama (restaurant), a Filipino restaurant in Chicago, Illinois

== See also ==
- Kasam (disambiguation)
- Kazama
