= List of Hakuoki: OVA 2021 episodes =

Hakuoki: OVA 2021
- Season 2021
- No. of episodes: 3

Release
- Original network: U-NEXT
- Original release: November 13, 2021 – January 29, 2022

Series chronology
- ← Previous; Hakuoki: Dawn of the Shinsengumi

Hakuoki: OVA 2021 is three-part OVA adaptation in the continuing anime series of Hakuoki. The events follow on from Season 3 Hakuoki: Dawn of the Shinsengumi and the story centers on a plot to assassinate the shogun by a group of ronin supported by the Tosa clan who attempt to discredit the Shinsengumi, including Chizuru's twin brother Kaoru Nagumo who impersonates her. It also introduces the Shinsengumi treasurer Sakai who is injured defending Chizuru and later becomes a Fury after being given the Water of Life.

The anime is produced by Studio Deen and the OVAs were released by U-NEXT between November 13, 2021, and January 29, 2022. The staff from the previous series return to produce the episodes.

The opening theme song is "Setsuna no Kodō" (Split-Second Heartbeat) performed by Aiko Yoshioka and the ending theme song "Kenran -I'll never forget you-." by Maon Kurosaki.

== Episode list ==
No. in season	Title	Original release date
1	"A Summer breeze in Grass, Time Vanished into the Clouds"; Transliteration: "Tsubananagashi, kumogakure no koku" (Japanese: 茅花流し, 雲隠れの刻)	November 13, 2021
In the year Kieo Year 1 (1865), a year after the Ikedaya incident (Note: List of Hakuoki: Demon of the Fleeting Blossom episodes) Chizuru is living with the Shinsengumi when Hijikata and Saito discuss incidents of fake Shinsengumi threatening and extorting merchants. Kondou announces that Lord Katamori has requested that Shinsengumi protect the shogun Lord Iemochi who will be visiting the capital and the Shinsengumi order new uniforms for the occasion. During the night, Kaoru sneaks in while dressed as Chizuru and frees four captive Furies, former Shinsengumi. The next day, the treasurer, Hyougo Sakai, is sent with Chizuru to collect the new uniforms accompanied by Okita and First Division while on their way on a patrol. They arrive at the fabric store, but are ambushed by Tosa ronins. Sakai tries to protect Chizuru but is wounded and they have to flee. While Chizuru runs off wearing Sakai's coat as a decoy, Kaoru offers the badly wounded Sakai a Water of Life. Back at the Shinsengumi headquarters, they are informed that the fabric store employees have been slaughtered and their uninforms stolen. The only clue is that the ronin spoke with a western Tosa dialect. Hijikata decides to keep the incident quiet as they couldn't cause panic when the shogun is coming. Meanwhile, Chizuru and Sakai have both been captured by the ronins and are held at the Tosa mansion. Elsewhere, Kazama hears of a Tosa clan plot to assassinate the shogun.
2	"Twilight, Hawk Moths at the Lantern"; Transliteration: "Yoiyami, yūgaobettō no to" (Japanese: 宵闇, 夕顔別当の燈)	November 13, 2021
The Shinsengumi find the bodies of two inspectors killed by Furies and recognize them as the ones sent to investigate the Tosa mansion. Kondo decides against action to avoid provoking conflict between the Aizu and Tosa, but Itou overhears and offers to use his connections to approach the Tosa to get an arrest warrant, revealing that the Tosa Domain also having problem with the ronins. Sakai regains consciousness and finds that his deep wound has healed. The Shinsengumi hear rumors of a Chizuru look-alike, and while following the clue, Heisuke and Harada sees Kaoru, still in disguise as Chizuru, and follow him. However, they fall into a deep well with freezing water at the bottom that has been set by Kaoru. While Sen is out with Kimigiku looking for Chizuru, they hear Heisuke and Harada and rescue them. After getting the arrest warrant, Hijikata leads a Shinsengumi force to officially inspect the Tosa mansion while Kazama encounters Kaoru and follows him to the Tosa mansion, rescuing Chizuru in the process. Hearing the location of the Tosa mansion from Sen, Heisuke and Harada enter the mansion and cut their way inside where they are reunited with Chizuru and the rest of the Shinsengumi. Kazama retreat after a brief fight with the Shinsengumi. Chizuru then report the ronin's plot to assassinate the shogun. Days later, Nagakura, Heisuke and Harada go to buy Chizuru a yukata for the approaching Tanabata Festival and while there, some false Shinsengumi enter the store and demand money from the owner. The three real Shinsengumi reveal their identities, dispatching the imposters without bloodshed and holding one for questioning. Meanwhile, Sakai suffers bloodlust.
3	"The Stars Meet, Searching the Galaxy"; Transliteration: "Hoshi mukae, unkan no shirabe" (Japanese: 星迎え、雲漢の調べ)	January 29, 2022
Under torture, the imposter reveals that the rebels planned to blend into the guard procession wearing Shinsengumi uniforms. Sannan and Hijikata suspect that the assassination would be carried out by the captive Furies, causing the Shinsengumi to be blamed. While being treated, the imposter mistook Chizuru as Kaoru, which Chizuru took advantage to trick him into revealing the location of the rest of ronins in an abandoned brewery, and the Shinsengumi go to confront them. As they approach, the ronins release the Furies to defend them, but they refuse and instead slay their captors. When the Shinsengumi arrive, they are forced to fight and kill their former comrades. Meanwhile, Kaoru frees Sakai after giving him anothet dose of Water of Life, causing him to attack the Shinsengumi in a blind rage, perceiving them as demons and Hijikata is forced to kill him. Watching from the sidelines, Kazama and Amagiri note that the Tosa demons have left the capital, sensing their plot to assassinate the shogun has fallen apart. Later, Hijikata asks Chizuru to send money and a letter from Sakai to his parents in thanks for his service to the Shinsengumi, and provides her with a yukata which she wears to the Tanabata Festival. While watching the milky way, Hijikata and Chizuru remembers their deceased comrades.
