= Kassam (surname) =

Kassam is a surname. Notable people with this name include:

- Amir Kassam, academic concerned with conservation agriculture
- Faazil Kassam (born 1985), Canadian table tennis player
- Firoz Kassam (born 1955), British entrepreneur
- Moez Kassam (born 1980), Canadian businessman and philanthropist
- Raheem Kassam (born 1986), British political activist and journalist
- Shireen Kassam (born 1975), British haematologist, promoter of plant-based nutrition
