= List of Hakuoki: Dawn of the Shinsengumi episodes =

Hakuoki: Dawn of the Shinsengumi
- No. of episodes: 12

Release
- Original network: TV Kanagawa, Chiba TV, TV Saitama, KBS Kyoto, Sun TV, AT-X, Tokyo MX TV, TV Aichi
- Original release: July 9 – September 24, 2012

Season chronology
- ← Previous; Hakuoki: A Memory of Snow Flowers Next → Hakuoki: OVA 2021

Dawn of the Shinsengumi is a prequel to the first two seasons of the anime series Hakuoki. It focuses on a boy named Ryunosuke Ibuki, who is saved and made into a servant by the leader of the Roshigumi, Kamo Serizawa. Serizawa's recklessness and abuse of authority causes a bad reputation for the Roshigumi. This creates opposition within the Roshigumi, mainly from Toshizo Hijikata and Isami Kondou. The Roshigumi is then approached by Koudou Yukimura, a doctor who offers an elixir which can increase physical prowess, but at the cost of the drinker's sanity.

The anime is produced by Studio Deen. The opening theme is "Reimei -reimei-" by Maon Kurosaki and the ending is "Hana no Atosaki" by Aika Yoshioka.

== Episode list ==
| No. in season | Title | Original release date |
|---|---|---|
| 1 | "Dawn of the Divine Warriors"; Transliteration: "Tenmu no Akatsuki" (Japanese: 天武の暁) | July 9, 2012 |
Serizawa Kamo is on his way to the capital and finds Ibuki Ryunosuke badly beaten by national loyalist warriors. After offering a riceball as a way of testing if the youth wants to live, Serizawa takes Ryunosuke to the Roshigumi headquarters in Mibu village near Kyoto to be treated. After his wounds are healed, Ryunosuke tries to leave but Kondou invites him to stay. Serizawa returns after a night drinking in the Shimabara red-light district and argues with Hijikata who accuses him of embarrassing the Roshigumi. Serizawa forcefully explains to the youth that he will remain as his personal "dog" to repay him. Kondou seeks Serizawa's influence to solicit support for the Roshigumi from the Aizu who control Kyoto. Later, Serizawa sends Ryunosuke to buy some sake and he encounters a left handed-samurai who asks for the whereabouts of Kondou or Hijikata.
| 2 | "Led By Destiny"; Transliteration: "Michibikareshi Sadame" (Japanese: 導かれし運命(さだめ)) | July 16, 2012 |
The man asking for Kondou and Hijikata is revealed to be Saitou Hajime who has come to join his former comrades in the Roshigumi. Serizawa again sends Ryunosuke into the city to buy sake, and Ryunosuke intervenes to stop some ronin requisitioning a man's money. The ronin draw their katanas and Ryunosuke withdraws in fear, but he is saved by the arrival of Shinpachi, Sanosuke and Heisuke. However, the bystanders are not grateful as they think the incident is just another dispute between ronin. Sanosuke and Shinpachi report this to Kondou, so he and Hijikata resolve to enhance their reputation by patrolling the city. Later, Saitou and Ryunosuke learn about Serizawa's violent temper and the Honjou Inn incident which caused a large rift between Serizawa and Kondou's supporters. Shogun Iemochi Tokugawa visits Kyoto and Kondou takes the Roshigumi into the city to protect him, but they are only able to follow and watch from afar. Meanwhile, Serizawa meets Koudou Yukimura and is given a red potion, the Water of Life, which will allow them to be sponsored by the Bakufu. Later, Okita and Ryunosuke see a frightened child run by. They investigate and are met with Shinpachi and Saitou covered in blood and with fierce looks on their faces.
| 3 | "Rules for a Pack of Wolves"; Transliteration: "Gunro no Okite" (Japanese: 群狼の掟) | July 23, 2012 |
Shinpachi explains that they chased rogue samurai into a shop, but were stopped from entering by the shopkeeper who mistrusted them. Hijikata recommends that no one goes out alone because of the risks of an incident with other factions. The Roshigumi finally receive permission from the Aiza clan to remain in Kyoto due to Serizawa's influence, and they celebrate by going to Shimabara. During the evening, Serizawa takes exception to the way that Okita is staring at him, and Okita says he's waiting for the opportunity to kill him. Serizawa laughs and says insults Okita's ability as a swordsman. Kosuzu, a maiko stands up to Serizawa provoking his anger. Ryuunosuke steps in to defend her and the others defuse the situation. In an effort to appear as a proper organization, Hijikata produces a list of strict rules for the Roshigumi which are reluctantly accepted in support of Kondou. During dinner, Okita mentions how he is itching to kill rogue samurai and Hijikata becomes concerned about his attitude. Hijikata suggests that he return to Edo, however, Okita is determined to stay with Kondou and runs off alone.
| 4 | "The Blade Drenched in Blood"; Transliteration: "Chinurareshi Yaiba" (Japanese: 六車九番隊、出動せよ) | July 30, 2012 |
Heisuke and the others cannot find Okita, so Kondou leaves to search for him alone and Ryuunosuke joins him. Kondou explains to Ryuunosuke how Okita came from a clan of samurai, but was left in the care of his older sister when his parents died. He was bullied by other trainees after his sister left him as a young boy in their small Shieikan Dojo in Edo. When the dojo held a practice tournament, the determined young Okita still continued to fight after being wounded. Eventually, Kondou and Ryuunosuke find Okita alone on a bridge by the river. Later, Tonouchi tells Serizawa that the new strict rules were the work of Hijikata and Sannan, and that Serizawa should take charge of the Roshigumi. However later, Serizawa meets Okita on the street and tells him that Tonouchi is plotting against Kondou the Roshigumi. That night, Okita lures Tonouchi out drinking and kills him. After Okita returns, Hijikata and Kondou accuse Serizawa of setting up Okita to break the Rules of Conduct. Serizawa just suggests that Hijikata and Kondou should leave with Okita.
| 5 | "Stairway to the Blue Skies"; Transliteration: "Sōkyu no Kizahashi" (Japanese: 蒼穹のきざはし) | August 6, 2012 |
Serizawa forces a money exchanging house to provide funds for the Roshigumi, which is strongly opposed by Kondou and Hijikata. Ryunosuke is told to buy an ink stick but the shopkeeper avoids selling one to him until Kosuzu arrives and resolves the situation. Ryunosuke does not recognize her until she thanks him for defending her against Serizawa in the red light district, but then she slaps him after he criticizes her profession. He is then reprimanded by Sanosuke, who takes him to Shimabara to apologize to Kosuzu who explains her work as an artist and hostess. The Roshigumi is invited to the Aizu clan headquarters and they arrange friendly matches to demonstrate their skills; Heisuke to fight Hijikata, Shinpachi to fight Saito, and Sannan to fight Okita. Kondou offers to teach Ryunosuke the way of the sword, however Ryunosuke declines the offer, still fearful of swords. After impressing the Aizu lieutenant general, the Roshigumi go out drinking all night, and receive their new distinctive blue and white uniforms from Serizawa.
| 6 | "Howling from the Darkness"; Transliteration: "Yami Yori no Hōkō" (Japanese: 闇よりの咆哮) | August 13, 2012 |
Niimi and Serizawa announce that the shogunate has provided a solution to the shortage of men through the "Water of Life" developed by Koudou Yukimura. Later, the Roshigumi encounter a demonic being which is almost impossible to kill. When the Roshigumi realize that the demon was a former comrade, Koudou Yukimura explains that the Water of Life supplied by the Bakufu gives a person increased strength and recuperative abilities, but at the cost of their sanity - they become a "Fury" or Rasetsu. Hijikata objects to using the experimental elixir. He agrees only if Niimi steps down to conduct the experiments, and Sannan offers to assist. A new batch of recruits join the Roshigumi, including Kai Shimada, Susumu Yamazaki and Katsuji Kawashima. Serizawa announces that rogue samurai have moved to Osaka, and a group should go and arrest them. Serizawa insists that Ryunosuke accompany them, but Hirama offers to go in his place. Several days later the squad returns from Osaka in a sour mood because Serizawa and Okita got into an argument and killed unarmed sumo wrestlers.
| 7 | "Oath Made on the Wind Blowing Over the Grass"; Transliteration: "Kusakaze no Chikai" (Japanese: 草颯の誓い) | August 20, 2012 |
Souji Okita offers to commit seppuku for breaking the rules and killing the unarmed sumo but Hijikata stops him. Serizawa argues that the samurai were within their rights, and the sumo stable's coach apologized for their behavior. He maintains that samurai should be feared, not loved. Kondou consoles Hijikata and they reminisce about years earlier when they both dreamed of becoming samurai. Hijikata hatches a plan to control Serizawa and appoints the new recruits Shimada and Yamazaki as Inspectors. Meanwhile, Niimi collects a new version of the elixir from Koudou and tests it on a rogue samurai which Serizawa arrested for the purpose. The ronin becomes a Rasetsu and is allowed to escape after Heisuke hesitates to kill him. The following night the senior Roshigumi hunt the Rasetsu, and this time Heisuke finds and reluctantly kills the monster who was once a man.
| 8 | "The Shackles of Pandemonium"; Transliteration: "Shura no Kasa" (Japanese: 修羅の枷鎖) | August 27, 2012 |
Another Rasetsu appears in the compound, but Saito kills him before he can escape. Serizawa orders Hijikata to place a Rasetsu head on display in Osaka. He assigns Saito to the onerous task which he accepts, recalling how years earlier Hijikata had accepted him as a warrior even though he was left-handed. The Roshigumi begin patrolling in their distinctive new blue and white coats to raise their profile, but the citizens still fear them and refer to them as the "Wolves of Mibu". Koudou visits the Mibu compound and questions Ryunosuke about the Rasetsu, but Yamazaki interrupts him and warns him not to give information to outsiders. Saito insists that Ryunosuke begin to learn swordsmanship, starting the following day. Days later, Shinpachi Nagakura drags Ryunosuke along for a night out drinking with Serizawa in Shimabara. He explains that although Serizawa in flawed, he has been instrumental in advancing the Roshigumi. Hishiya, the tailor who made the Roshigumi uniforms for Serizawa, sends a woman to collect the money, but Serizawa refuses to pay. Meanwhile, Kondou's supporters discover that ronin are demanding money by using the Roshigumi name, and begin to wonder if Serizawa is an asset or a liability.
| 9 | "The Light of a Flashing Sword"; Transliteration: "Hikari no Tenmetsuno Ken" (Japanese: きらめく剣の光) | September 3, 2012 |
Ryunosuke spends some time with Kosuzu eating dango, and comments that he will be spending a few days in Osaka with Serizawa and some Roshigumi. Later, Yamazaki accuses Ryunosuke of disloyalty which provokes a fist fight, but they later share some of their backgrounds and make peace with each other. in Osaka, Serizawa takes Nagakura out drinking with him, but Serizawa behaves badly towards the geishas and threatens to kill them. Hijikata offers to sever their chignons instead which satisfies Serizawa. However, news of the incident travels back to Kyoto, severely damaging the already poor reputation of the Roshigumi, even turning Kosuzu against Ryunosuke. Ryunosuke confronts Serizawa, but does not have the conviction to challenge him to a duel. Later, Ryunosuke realizes that he must begin to take control of his own destiny and either become a samurai or leave. When Saiki is caught extorting money in the name of the Roshigumi, Serizawa offers him the choice of seppuku or a new version of the elixir, and he chooses the latter. Saiki becomes a Rasetsu and kills a fellow corps member, Sasaki, and a woman accompanying him. Okita finds Saiki in the Shimabara and kills him with some help from Ryunosuke, who accompanied him. Later, Hijikata hesitantly acknowledges Ryunosuke's contribution. He also tells Okita that he will become the Roshigumi's "sword".
| 10 | "The Brightly Burning Beacon"; Transliteration: "Akaruku Moe te iru Biikon" (Japanese: 明るく燃える信号) | September 10, 2012 |
The Roshigumi hold a sumo demonstration which enhances their standing in the community and provides necessary funds. However immediately afterwards, Serizawa burns down a store on suspicion of trading with foreigners, further undermining the Roshigumi's reputation. The woman from the tailor again demands that Serizawa pay the bill, but when he still refuses she asks to stay with him as she cannot return without the money. While out on another long drinking binge, Serizawa suffers a loss of memory, and the Oni, Kazama Chikage, appears and warns him that he is heading towards a painful death from disease. Koudou Yukimura provides Niimi with a powder which will reduce the bloodlust of the Rasetsu enabling them to be controlled. Meanwhile, Houdou is asked by the Aizu Kyoto Military Commissioner to rein in Serizawa or risk losing their support. Suddenly the Choshu attack The Sakaimachi Gate which is defended by the Aizu and Satsuma forces. The Roshigumi march under their banner of "Truth" to help defend the imperial gate and in return, the Aizu bestow the name "Shinsengumi" on them. Meanwhile, Niimi continues his own experiments to improve the effectiveness of the Water of Life elixir.
| 11 | "A Moonlit Night Filled with Flowers"; Transliteration: "Tsukiyo Hanade Ippai" (Japanese: 月夜は花で満たされました) | September 17, 2012 |
The Shinsengumi inspect Koudou Yukimura's premises which has been burned to the ground and he is missing. Meanwhile, Niimi has developed a powder to calm the Rasetsu bloodlust and help retain their sanity. Kondou tries to convince Serizawa to stand down to protect the image of the Shinsengumi but Serizawa demeans Kondou and refuses to answer. Later, Ryunosuke overhears Serizawa telling his woman companion that he has a fatal disease, caught from the first and last woman he ever loved. Niimi diasppears, taking the exixer with him and the Shinsengumi suspect that he plans to sell it to the highest bidder. Yamazaki reports a number of suspicious slayings indicating the presence of Rasetsu. Serizawa informs Ryunosuke that Niimi is using a pseudonym and has approached nationalist loyalist ronin. The Shinsengumi locate Niimi at a restaurant in the Shimabara and Souji, Saito, Hijikata and Yamazaki go to apprehend him. They find him, but he has taken the elixir himself and easily fights them off until he becomes by bloodlust giving Hijikata an opportunity to behead him. Kondou and Hijikata report the successful conclusion of the Niimi incident to the Aizu Lord who then orders that Serizawa must be removed from his position.
| 12 | "The Great Dawn"; Transliteration: "Idai na Yoake" (Japanese: 大きな夜明け) | September 24, 2012 |
Kondou and Hijikata invite Serizawa and the Shinsengumi to a drinking session in the Shimabara, planning to "take care" of Serizawa later that night. Serizawa returns early to the headquarters along with Okita, Harada, Hijikata, Inoue and Sannan. Kondou and Saito keep the others back but Shinpachi is suspicious. Saito tries to stop Shinpachi from leaving while Ryunosuke runs off to warn Serizawa with Heisuke in pursuit. Hijikata enters Serizawa's room to find that he has already killed his woman companion. Hijikata attacks Serizawa who drinks the elixir just as Ryunosuke arrives. Serizawa tells the boy to live before eventually being cut down by Hijikata. Okita is given the task to silence Ryunosuke and leave no witnesses, however, after disarming Ryunosuke, Okita pushes him off a bridge giving him a chance to live. Sannan offers to continue research into the elixir as requested by the Bafuku, and create a Rasetsu unit within the Shinsengumi. In epilogue, Chizuru Yukimura leaves home and travels to Kyoto and find her father. She passes Ryunosuke walking in the opposite direction, hoping to make a new life for himself.
