= Kasam =

Kasam may refer to:

- Kasam (1988 film), an Indian film
- Kasam (1992 film), a Nepalese film
- Kasam (2001 film), an Indian film
- Kasamm, a 2000 Indian drama series by Ekta Kapoor for DD National

== See also ==
- Kasama (disambiguation)
- Kassam (disambiguation)
- Kazam
- Qasam (disambiguation)
