= Hidetoshi Kubota =

Japanese actor (born 1987)

- 久保田秀敏
- Pronunciation: Kubota Hidetoshi
- Born: January 12, 1987 (age 39); Fukuoka, Japan
- Occupation: Actor
- Years active: 2009–present
- Agent: Avex

Hidetoshi Kubota (Japanese: 久保田秀敏; born January 12, 1987) is a Japanese stage and film actor. Born in Fukuoka, he debuted in 2009, and has appeared in multiple projects including Musical: The Prince of Tennis season 2, Moriarty the Patriot, Blood Blockade Battlefront, and Hakuoki. He is under Avex Management.

== Career ==
After graduating from a vocational school in Fukuoka, Kubota moved to Tokyo for work, and in 2009, while working as a hairdresser, he was scouted to enter the entertainment industry. Prior to 2009, he had been repeatedly approached by multiple companies to join the entertainment industry, so when he decided to look for new opportunities after disagreements with his salon, he took the opportunity to explore the path of acting.

Outside of acting, he has performed as a Buzen Kagura dancer since he was young.

He played the role of Niou Masaharu in the second season of the musical "The Prince of Tennis", and later performed his first lead role as Saito Yakumo in the stage play "Psychic Detective Yakumo: The Tree of Lies". In 2015, he was invited to the 39th Montreal World Film Festival for his role in the movie "Shinjuku Midnight Baby".

He cites his inspirations as being Teruyuki Kagawa and Takayuki Yamada.

== Works ==
=== Stage ===
- Rising Flag (July 22-24 2011, Ikebukuro theatreKASSAI) - Detective Nabeshima / Captain Odds
- Tokyo Actors&Actress Market Winter 2011 Episode 1 "Silent Cat" (December 7-11 2011, Sasazuka Factory) - Cat
- Musical "The Prince of Tennis" 2nd Season - Masaharu Niou
  - Seigaku vs Rikkai (July 13 - September 9 2012, TOKYO DOME CITY HALL and others)
  - SEIGAKU Farewell Party (October 11-14 2012, TOKYO DOME CITY HALL)
  - Seigaku vs Higa (December 20 2012 - February 17 2013, Nippon Seinenkan Large Hall and others)
  - 10th Anniversary Concert Dream Live 2013 (April 27-29 2013, Yokohama Arena / May 3-5 2013, World Memorial Hall)
  - Sports Day 2014 (April 26 2014, Yokohama Arena)
  - Seigaku vs Rikkai Nationals (July 12 - September 28 2014, TOKYO DOME CITY HALL and others)
  - Concert Dream Live 2014 (November 15-16 2014, World Memorial Hall / November 22-24 2014, Saitama Super Arena)
- Stage "Psychic Detective Yakumo" - Yakumo Saito (lead)
  - "The Tree of Lies" (rerun) (August 21-28 2013, Aoyama Round Theatre)
  - "The Coffin of Prayer" (February 11-22 2015, New National Theatre Tokyo / February 27 - March 1 2015, ABC Hall)
  - "Tower of Judgement" (May 31 - June 11 2017, Shinagawa Prince Hotel Club eX / June 16-18 2017, Osaka Business Park Circular Hall)
- Stage "My Host-chan" - Ryusei
  - Stage "My Host-chan" (October 25 - November 4 2013, Aoyama Theatre)
  - ~Bloody Battle! Fukuoka Nakasu Edition~ (December 5-14 2014, Nippon Seinenkan / December 26-27 2014, Morinomiya Piloti Hall)
  - THE FINAL ~Clash! Nagoya Sakae Edition~ (January 29 - March 2 2016, The Galaxy Theatre and others)
  - REBORN (January 11 - February 2 2017, Sunshine Theatre and others)
  - REBORN ~Fantastic! Osaka Minami Edition~ (January 23 2018, Sunshine Theatre)※Guest Appearance
- End of Year Meiji Sitting Fair ~It's the end of the year! Everyone Assemble!!~ (December 21-24 & 31 2013, Meiji-za Theatre / NHK Osaka Hall) - Tokugawa Iemitsu
- "POTLUCK FESTA 2015" - Improvisation Drama x Instant Preview x Pro Wrestling!? (January 17, 2015, Differ Ariake)
- Reading Stage "Vengeance Can Wait" (July 10 2015, Akasaka RED/THEATER) - Hidenori Yamane
- AZUMI - Keijiro Sawaki
  - AZUMI Bakumatsu (September 11-24 2015, New National Theatre Tokyo)
  - AZUMI New Year's Party (December 31 2015 - January 4 2016, Zepp Blue Theater Roppongi)
- Rusted Jack is Dying to Die (October 28 - November 3 2015, CBGK Shibugeki!!) - Jack (lead)
- ~Collapse Series~ "The Kujomaru Family Murder Case" (April 8-24 2016, Haiyuza Theatre / April 27 2016, Nippon Tokushu Togyo Civic Hall (Nagoya Civic Hall) / April 29 2016, Theater BRAVA! / April 30 - May 1 2016, IMS Hall)
- Wakasama Gumi Mairu (August 7-14 2016, The Galaxy Theatre) - Kaoru Sonoyama
- Chiruran: Shinsengumi Requiem (April 7-10 2017, Morinomiya Piloti Hall / April 20-30 2017,The Galaxy Theatre) - Okada Izo
- Reading drama "RAYZ OF LIGHT" (re-run) (May 6 2017, Shidax Culture Hall) - Reizei
- Reki Tame Live～A Gathering of History-Loving Entertainers!
  - Part 2 (July 27 2017, YAMANO HALL)
  - Part 3 (September 8-9 2018 EX THEATER ROPPONGI)
  - Part 4 (March 15-17 2019, EX THEATER ROPPONGI)
- Hiroyuki Iejo x Natsumi Ogawa, Sisters Series 3rd installment "Begging" (September 26 - October 1 2017, Theater Sun-mall / October 5-6 2017, HEP HALL)
- Musical "The Scarlet Pimpernel" (November 13-15 2017, Umeda Arts Theater Main Hall / November 20 - December 5, TBS Akasaka ACT Theater) - Ben
- Mononofu series "Run Hayabusa Hito Yamato" (February 8-18 2018, The Galaxy Theatre / February 24-25,2018, Morinomiya Piloti Hall) - Enomoto Takeaki
- Family Story (May 3-4 2018, santomyuze Ueda City Cultural Exchange Center / May 11-13 2018, IMA Hall) - Takuya Kobayashi (lead)
- The Hollow Truth - Chikamatsu Joruri: The Eternal Journey (June 3-10 2018, HAKUHINKAN THEATER) - Jihei
- Sengoku Night Blood (August 16-26 2018, The Galaxy Theatre) ‐ Oda Nobunaga
- Anti-ism (December 12-20 2018, OWLSPOT Theater) - Yabushita Masato
- Bungo to Alchemist - Ryunosuke Akutagawa
  - Elegy of Unwelcome Presences (February 21-28 2019, Theatre Senjyu / March 9-10 2019, Kyoto-Gekijo)
  - Waltz of Heretics (December 27-29 2019, Morinomiya Piloti Hall / January 8-13 2020, Shinagawa Prince Hotel Stellar Ball)
  - Canon of Composers (September 10-22 2020, Shinagawa Prince Hotel Stellar Ball / September 25-27 2020, Kyoto-Gekijo)
  - Rondo of Lamenter (September 2-11 2022, Shinagawa Prince Hotel Stellar Ball / September 17-19 2022, Morinomiya Piloti Hall)
- "Theater Animeza Hybrid ~Encounter Stage~" (March 21-26, 2019, CBGK Shibugeki!!) - Sozo
- Stage "Kuroko's Basketball" ULTIMATE-BLAZE ~Teikou Edition~ Reading Stage (released April 15 2019) - Shuzo Nijimura
- Musical "Moriarty the Patriot" - Albert James Moriarty
  - Musical "Moriarty the Patriot" (May 10-19 2019, The Galaxy Theatre / May 25-26 2019, Kashiwabara Civic Cultural Center Rivière Hall)
  - Op.2 -A Scandal in the British Empire- (July 31 - August 10 2020, The Galaxy Theatre / August 14-16 2020 Kyoto-Gekijo)
  - Op.3 -The Phantom of Whitechapel- (August 5-15 2021, Shinagawa Prince Hotel Stellar Ball / August 19-22 2021, SANKEI HALL BREEZÉ)
  - Op.4 -The Two Criminals- (January 27-29 2023, Shin Kabukiza / February 2-12 2023, The Galaxy Theatre)
  - Op.5 -The Final Problem- (August 24-27 2023, Mielparque Osaka Hall / September 1-10 2023, The Galaxy Theatre)
  - Musical "Moriarty the Patriot" 5th Anniversary Concert (July 11-15 2024, Theater H)
  - A Study In Scarlet -Reprise- (June 27- July 19 2026, The Galaxy Theatre)
- Stage Play "Sengoku BASARA" Restoration of Tensei (July 12-21 2019, HULIC HALL TOKYO / July 26-28 2019, Umeda Arts Theater Theatre Drama City) - Yoshiteru Ashikaga
- Stage "It isn't hard being a boy??" (August 7-11 2019, Yurakucho Yomiuri Hall) - Yosuke (adult)
- Footsteps of the Triskelion (September 4-16 2019, Akasaka RED/THEATER) - Sakuma
- Stage "Blood Blockade Battlefront - Steven A. Starphase
  - Stage "Blood Blockade Battlefront" (November 2-10 2019, The Galaxy Theatre / November 14-17 2019 , Umeda Arts Theater Theatre Drama City)
  - Beat Goes On (November 20-29 2020, The Galaxy Theatre / December 3-6 2020, Mielparque Osaka Hall)
  - Blitz Along Alone (October 22-31 2021, The Galaxy Theatre / November 4-7, Umeda Arts Theater Theatre Drama City)
- Avenue X theater vol.1 "Valentine Blue" (February 18-25 2020, HAKUHINKAN THEATER) - Yusuke Wakabayashi
- Musical "Hakuoki" - Toshizo Hijikata
  - "Shinkai" Souma Kazue-hen (April 2-5 2020, Meijiza (Special Performance) / April 9-12 2020, SANKEI HALL BREEZÉ) ※Performances canceled due to the coronavirus pandemic
  - "Shinkai" Souma Kazue Edition (April 1-4 2021, Nippon Seinenkan Hall / April 8-11, AiiA 2.5 Theater Kobe)
  - "Shinkai" Saito Hajime Edition (April 22-27 2022, Shinagawa Prince Hotel Stellar Ball/ May 1-5 2022, Kyoto-Gekijo)
  - HAKU-MYU LIVE 3 (October 29-30 2022, Zepp Namba (OSAKA) / November 11-13 2022, Zepp DiverCity (TOKYO))
  - "Shinkai" Sannan Keisuke Edition (April 8-16 2023, Theatre Senjyu / April 22-23 2023, SANKEI HALL BREEZÉ)
  - "Shinkai" Hijikata Toshizo Edition (April 13-14 2024, AiiA 2.5 Theater Kobe / April 19-29 2024, The Galaxy Theatre) (lead)
  - "Shinkai" Toudou Heisuke (June 20-29 2025, The Galaxy Theatre)
  - HAKU-MYU LIVE 4 (December 19-21 2025, Zepp DiverCity (TOKYO) / December 27-28 2025, Zepp Osaka Bayside)
- Tokyo Nuclear Club (January 10-17 2021, Honda Theater) - Ryosuke Kano
- Reading drama "5 years after ver.5〜K-N-U-K〜" (April 17-25 2021, Sumida Park Theater Sou)
- Musical drama "Galileo★CV" (May 26-30, 2021, Theater Sun-mall) - Team Galileo Manabu Yukawa
- "Ikebukuro West Gate Park" THE STAGE (June 25-27 2021, Toyosu PIT / July 1-4 2021, Theatre Senjyu) - Reiichiro Yokoyama
- Reading drama "5 seconds left until Tops!" (September 11-12, 2021, Shinjuku Theater Tops) - Man 1
- Stage "SK∞ the Infinity The Stage" - Kaoru "Cherry Blossom" Sakurayashiki
  - Part 1: The First Part ~The Beginning of a Hot Night~ (December 2-12 2021, The Galaxy Theatre)
  - Part 2: The Last Part ~Our Infinity~ (January 15-24 2022, Nippon Seinenkan Hall) ※Performances canceled due to the coronavirus pandemic
- Stage "Chico Will Scold You! on STAGE" ~At that moment, history moved a little!~ (March 18-21 2022, Nippon Seinenkan Hall / March 26-27 2022, SANKEI HALL BREEZÉ) - Prince Shotoku
- Punk Fantasy『BOSS CAT』~From Charles Perrault's "Puss in Boots"~ (June 10-19 2022, Shinagawa Prince Hotel Stellar Ball) - Ogre / Butler / Third Son
- Welcome to the Moon (July 28-31, 2022, PARTHENON TAMA Main Hall)
- Double Booking! - Ryuichi Fujisaki
  - -2023- (July 13-23 2023, Shinjuku Theater Tops / Kinokunya Hall)
  - 2nd (April 5-13 2025, Shinjuku Theater Tops / Kinokunya Hall)
- Story Rocking "Peach" ~From Akutagawa Ryunosuke's "Momotaro"~ (October 20-29 2023, Theatre Senjyu / November 4-5, Umeda Arts Theater Theatre Drama City) - Ivan Phezanthi
- HIGH CARD the STAGE - CRACK A HAND (January 19-29 2024, Theatre Senjyu) - Norman Kingstadt / Lindsey Betz / Lucky Lunchman / Ed Nolan / Tyler Redgrave
- Women's Friendship and Muscles THE MUSICAL -Happy Biceps- (May 17 2024, Nakano ZERO Large Hall / May 25-26 2024, Morinomiya Piloti Hall / May 30 - June 9 2024, Shinagawa Prince Hotel Stellar Ball) - Shota Hasegawa
- Kijo no Kuron: The Three Beasts part 3 "The Child Praying in the Green Garden is a Beast" (September 11-16 2024, Honda Theater)
- Takufes 12th installment "Yuu" (November 1-10 2024, Sunshine Theatre / November 14-17 2024, Umeda Arts Theater Theatre Drama City / November 23 2024, Canal City Theater / November 29 - December 1 2024, WINC AICHI / December 12 2024, kanamoto Hall) - Masaya Aikawa
- Matsumoto Performing Arts Center production "The Lord and I" (February 13-16 2025, Matsumoto Performing Arts Center Small Hall / February 28 - March 2 2025, Kintetsu Artkan Museum)
- Stage "My Home Hero" (November 13-24 2025, Shinagawa Prince Hotel Club eX)
- Bakumatsu Record - Chapter of Kyoto - (January 23-25 2026, Pontocho Kaburenjo)

=== Dramas ===
- We Are Angels! NO ANGEL NO LUCK (July 1 - December 23 2009, TV Tokyo)
- JIN (October - December 2009 TBS) - Medical Student
- Tumbling (April - June 2010, TBS) - Student
- Super☆Scream Land (July - September 2013, CBC) - Naoki Oba
- My Host-chan S ~6 months of miracles with a new host owner~ (April - September 2014, TV Asahi) - Ryusei
- Ooku "Part 2: Tragic Sisters" (January 29 2016, Fuji TV) - Genichiro Yoshida
- Actress Fall (Part 2: March 30 2016, BS Asahi)
- Is it true that you're getting married, Professor Hayako? Episode 2 (April 28 2016, Fuji TV) - Jun Akabane
- Gold Woman (May 28 2016, TV Asahi) - Hasebe
- I Love You So Much Final Episode (September 20 2016, TBS)
- I want to play Basketball and Love Episode 3 (September 21 2016, Fuji TV) - Sugino Shusai
- A Forest Without Flowers and Fruits (March 29 2017, TV Tokyo) - Boy (Black Suit)
- Detective Story (April 8 2018, TV Asahi)
- Strange Tales '18 Autumn Special "Christmas Monster" (November 10 2018, Fuji TV) - Akira Miyata
- No Side Game Episode 1 (July 7 2019, TBS) - Reporter
- Housekeeper Mitazono Special Edition (May 29 2020, TV Asahi) - Sato
- Special Investigation Unit 9 Season 4 (2021) - Yuki Sho
- WOWOW Original Drama Hill Season 2 Episode 1 (April 15, 2022, WOWOW Prime)

=== Film ===
- DANCE!DANCEDANCE!! (July 2013) - Kenji Karashima
- Gewalt (November 2013, ALL IN ENTERTAINMENT) - Ruito Genba
- Kabadeen!!!!!!! ~Ah, Hanafubuki High School~ (February 2014) - Usui
- Decline of an Assassin (2015, FAITHentertainment) - Kazuki Kawaguchi ※Official Invitation to the 39th Montreal World Film Festival
- Shinjuku Midnight Baby (January 2016) - Akira ※Official Invitation to the 39th Montreal World Film Festival
- Apex (Teppen) (2017) all 3 films - Sorimachi (former member of the motorcycle gang "Kyoran Bakusoukai")
- Impossibility Defense (February 2018, Hakuhodo) - Katsuaki Sakaki
- Someday, I Will Abandon My Mother (January 2025)
- Fake Out! (June 2025) - Satoshi Sugimoto

=== Web Dramas ===
- Terra Formars/A New Hope (April 2016, dTV) - Fujisawa Yukihiko
- YouTube Drama "Internet Ghost Stories x 100 Tales" Season 2 ※Episodes 11-20 (August - October 2020, YouTube)

=== Other Works ===
- My Atlas ~Geography Boys Go~ (2014, NicoNico Live Broadcast / Yoimuri TV)
- Bishonen Cottage (August 11 - 19, 2014 (9 consecutive broadcasts), a-nationTV)

== Publications ==
- 久保田秀敏1st写真集『1page』 [Hidetoshi Kubota 1st Photobook "1page"] (in Japanese). Japan: Mediaboy publishing. 2014-03-20. ISBN 978-4863881662.
- 久保田秀敏/1Graphic [Hidetoshi Kubota/1Graphic] (in Japanese). Japan: E-NET FRONTIER. 2015-10-23. ASIN B014IC0XUW.
