= Kasem =

Kasem may refer to:

== Language ==
- Kasem language, Gur language spoken in Burkina Faso and Ghana

== People ==
- Casey Kasem (1932–2014), American radio personality and voice actor
- Kazi Abul Kasem (1913–2003), Bengali Bangladesh painter and cartoonist
- Mike Kasem (born 1973), American television actor, and radio DJ
- Yasmine K. Kasem (born 1993) American visual artist

== Places ==
- Kasem Bundit University in Bangkok, Thailand
- Nakhon Kasem, Bangkok market
- Kasem, Trakan Phuet Phon - Ubon Ratchathani Province, Thailand

== See also ==
- Kasim, Kasem appears as a spelling of the name Kasim
