= Hakuoki =

Video game series by Idea Factory

薄桜鬼 〜新選組奇譚〜 (Hakuoki: Shinsengumi Kitan)
- Genre: Otome, historical fantasy
- Anime television series

Hakuoki: Demon of the Fleeting Blossom
- Directed by: Osamu Yamasaki
- Produced by: Asuka Yamazaki; Kazuhiko Hasegawa; Mitsutoshi Ogura
- Written by: Ryōta Yamaguchi (#1); Mitsutaka Hirota (#2–3, 9, 12); Yoshiko Nakamura (#4, 6, 8, 11); Megumu Sasano (#5, 7, 10)
- Music by: Kow Otani
- Studio: Studio Deen
- Licensed by: Crunchyroll (current): AUS: Hanabee; NA: Sentai Filmworks (former); UK: MVM Films
- Original network: TV Kanagawa, Chiba TV, TV Saitama, KBS Kyoto, Sun TV, AT-X, Tokyo MX TV, TV Aichi
- Original run: April 4, 2010 – June 20, 2010
- Episodes: 12
- Anime television series

Hakuoki: Record of the Jade Blood
- Directed by: Osamu Yamasaki
- Produced by: Asuka Yamazaki; Kazuhiko Hasegawa; Mitsutoshi Ogura
- Written by: Megumu Sasano (#1, 5, 8); Mitsutaka Hirota (#2, 7); Yoshiko Nakamura (#3, 6, 10); Osamu Yamasaki (#4, 9)
- Music by: Kow Otani
- Studio: Studio Deen
- Licensed by: Crunchyroll (current); AUS: Hanabee; NA: Sentai Filmworks (former); UK: MVM Films
- Original network: TV Kanagawa, Chiba TV, TV Saitama, KBS Kyoto, Sun TV, AT-X, Tokyo MX TV, TV Aichi
- Original run: October 10, 2010 – December 12, 2010
- Episodes: 10
- Original video animation

Hakuoki: A Memory of Snow Flowers
- Directed by: Osamu Yamasaki
- Produced by: Asuka Yamazaki; Kazuhiko Hasegawa; Mitsutoshi Ogura
- Written by: Yoshiko Nakamura (#1, 5–6); Megumu Sasano (#2, 4); Mitsutaka Hirota (#3)
- Music by: Kow Otani
- Studio: Studio Deen
- Licensed by: AUS: Hanabee; NA: Sentai Filmworks; UK: MVM Films
- Released: August 5, 2011 – July 27, 2012
- Runtime: 25 minutes (each)
- Episodes: 6
- Anime television series

Hakuoki: Dawn of the Shinsengumi
- Directed by: Osamu Yamasaki
- Produced by: Asuka Yamazaki; Mitsutoshi Ogura; Takashi Iwasaki; Yōhei Hayashi
- Written by: Osamu Yamasaki (#1, 4); Mitsutaka Hirota (#2, 6, 9); Megumu Sasano (#3, 7, 10); Yoshiko Nakamura (#5, 8, 12)
- Music by: Kow Otani
- Studio: Studio Deen
- Licensed by: Crunchyroll (current); AUS: Hanabee; NA: Sentai Filmworks (former); UK: MVM Films
- Original network: Yomiuri TV, AT-X, Tokyo MX TV, TV Kanagawa, TV Aichi, BS11, ANIPLUS
- Original run: July 9, 2012 – September 24, 2012
- Episodes: 12
- Anime film

Hakuoki: Wild Dance of Kyoto
- Directed by: Osamu Yamasaki
- Produced by: Mitsutoshi Ogura; Yōhei Hayashi; Asuka Yamazaki; Jun Fukuda; Nobumitsu Urasaki; Hiroshi Nishijima
- Written by: Osamu Yamasaki; Tsunekiyo Fujisawa
- Music by: Kenji Kawai
- Studio: Studio Deen
- Licensed by: NA: Sentai Filmworks
- Released: August 24, 2013
- Runtime: 96 minutes
- Anime film

Hakuoki: Warrior Spirit of the Blue Sky
- Directed by: Osamu Yamasaki
- Produced by: Mitsutoshi Ogura; Yōhei Hayashi; Asuka Yamazaki; Jun Fukuda; Nobumitsu Urasaki; Hiroshi Nishijima
- Written by: Osamu Yamasaki; Tsunekiyo Fujisawa
- Music by: Kenji Kawai
- Studio: Studio Deen
- Licensed by: NA: Sentai Filmworks
- Released: March 8, 2014
- Runtime: 87 minutes
- Anime television series

Hakuoki: Otogisōshi
- Directed by: Parako Shinohara
- Studio: DLE
- Original run: April 5, 2016 – June 28, 2016
- Episodes: 12
- Original video animation
- Directed by: Osamu Yamasaki
- Music by: Kow Otani
- Studio: Studio Deen
- Released: November 14, 2021 – January 24, 2022
- Episodes: 3

Hakuoki (薄桜鬼 〜新選組奇譚〜, Hakuōki ~Shinsengumi Kitan~; Demon of the Fleeting Blossom: The Tale of the Shinsengumi) is a Japanese otome video game series by Idea Factory, first released for the PlayStation 2 on the 18th September 2008 and ported to many other platforms. It has been adapted into an anime series by Studio Deen; the first series was broadcast from April to June 2010, and the second series was broadcast from October to December 2010. An OVA series, titled Hakuoki: A Memory of Snow Flowers and adapting from Hakuoki: Stories of Shinsengumi was released from August 2011 to July 2012. A third series based on the prequel, Hakuoki Reimeiroku was broadcast from July to September 2012. The series has also been adapted as two different manga series.

Two films were released in 2013 and 2014. The first was released in August 2013 and on DVD in February 2014. The film is a retelling of both seasons in greater detail and with a slightly different ending. The second film was released on March 8, 2014. A short anime television series adaptation of a new instalment of the game, titled Hakuoki: Otogisōshi and produced by DLE, aired from April to June 2016. A new OVA series by Studio Deen was released from November 2021 to January 2022.

The anime television series and films have been licensed by Sentai Filmworks in North America. Crunchyroll acquired the streaming rights to the series after Sentai Filmworks lost the rights.

== Gameplay ==
Like most otome games, the player takes the role of a female character who can choose from a variety of male characters as her 'love interest'.

Hakuoki's gameplay requires little interaction from the player as most of the game's duration is spent on reading the text that appears, representing either dialogue between the characters, narration, or the inner thoughts of the protagonist. Often, players will come be given the chance to choose from options displayed on the screen that would be crucial to the story. The time between these decision points is variable and during these times, gameplay pauses until a choice is made that furthers the plot in a specific direction. There are six main plot lines that the players will have the chance to experience, one for each of the heroes in the story. When interacting with the chosen heroes with the routes, an "affection meter" is created which is raised by giving them an answer that pleases them. The ending the player will get in each route depends on the affection the player has achieved.

It also included all the basic functions such as CG Gallery, Music List, Scene Recollection, and skip options. Once completing a route, player can unlock the 'Record of Service' to select exactly which chapter they would like to start the next play through on, as well as adjusting the bachelor's affection level to access the different endings. There's also encyclopaedia in understanding the historical terminology and timeline.

In the updated remake Kyoto Winds and Edo Blossoms, six more routes are added. In Edo Blossoms, there's also "corruption meter", which tells the players the bachelor's corruption rate after becoming a Fury. Making sure the corruption level is low is crucial to prevent the player from reaching bad ends.

== Plot ==
Taking place during the Edo period, around the 1860s, Chizuru Yukimura heads to Kyoto to search for her father, finding herself attacked by mad men before they are cut down by members of the Shinsengumi who mistake her for a boy and take her into custody for interrogation. Upon learning that she is a girl and the daughter of a doctor who developed the Water of Life elixir that turns those that drink it into invincible blood lusting berserkers called Furies (羅刹, Rasetsu; lit. Rakshasa), the Shinsengumi decide to keep her as an aide in their search. In time, as the Shinsengumi aid the shogunate in the Bakufu, Chizuru begins to develop a bond with the Shinsengumi and its aloof member Toshizo Hijikata. However, as time passes, Chizuru and Shinsengumi confront a mysterious faction who claimed to be demons and that Chizuru is also a demon with her father revealed to be experimenting on the Water of Life to create the Furies to conquer the human race.

== Characters ==
=== Main ===
Chizuru Yukimura (雪村 千鶴, Yukimura Chizuru)
Voiced by: Houko Kuwashima (Japanese); Brittney Karbowski (English)
The main female protagonist. Chizuru comes to Kyoto from her hometown of Edo in search of her missing father, Kodo Yukimura (雪村 綱道, Yukimura Kōdō), a practitioner of Western medicine. Unknown to Chizuru, her father under orders from the Shogunate develops the Water of Life (変若水, Ochimizu), an elixir that increases the drinker's healing abilities, speed, and strength yet could turn the drinker into a mindless killing monster called Fury. At the beginning of the story, she-(while disguised and mistaken for a young boy) is seen being chased by two men, who were suddenly attacked and killed by two Furies. She witnesses Saito and Okita kill off the Furies and is then taken to the Shinsengumi headquarters by Hijikata, where they allow her to stay, because they too were in search of her father. In the anime series, she eventually falls in love with Hijikata.
Chizuru has a secret: she is fact descended from a vast and powerful Demon clan from the East of Japan, along with her estranged twin brother Kaoru. Chizuru being the sole survivor of the clan by the end of the story. Because demons have scattered and declined in numbers over the centuries, especially the female ones, Chikage Kazama seeks her out as to preserve their race by marrying her. She is the wielder of a kodachi called Shotsuren, which is a mate to Kaoru's katana, Daitsuren. They are part of the Yukimura Family's heirloom.
Toshizo Hijikata (土方 歳三, Hijikata Toshizō)
Voiced by: Shinichiro Miki (Japanese); Andrew Love (English)
The titular character of the series, Hijikata is the vice-commander of the Shinsengumi and makes most of the Shinsengumi's decisions. He is called Demon Vice-Commander and is both feared and respected by his men. He is also often referred to as "Toshi" by Kondo and Iba. Hijikata is the one who brought Chizuru back to the Shinsengumi headquarters the night she witnessed a Rasetsu on the loose that attacked two men chasing her. He is responsible for her welfare, and even though he acts as if this were to his dismay, he cares for Chizuru's safety, and is often shown protecting her during battles. Hijikata drinks the Water of Life and becomes a Fury in order to defeat Kazama, fueled by rage after seeing fellow Shinsengumi warrior Genzaburo Inoue dead at his hand. Near the end of his route, in recognition to his conviction and strength, Kazama acknowledges Hijikata as a true demon and gives him his demon name, "Hakuoki", from the fact that Hijikata's determination to live despite his limited life-span due to Water of Life is like cherry blossom. In the anime and manga series, he is Chizuru's love interest. He is based on the historical Hijikata Toshizō.
Souji Okita (沖田 総司, Okita Sōji)
Voiced by: Showtaro Morikubo (Japanese); Blake Shepard (English)
Okita is the First Division Captain and one of Shinsengumi's best swordsmen. He is fiercely loyal to Kondo, and despite his cheerful disposition, he is willing to kill anyone that he thinks would threaten Shinsengumi. He suffers from tuberculosis, and is later visited by Kaoru Nagumo who gives him a bottle of the Water of Life to cure his tuberculosis. Driven by guilt at being incapacitated by his illness and frustrated by his inability to fight for Kondo, Okita drinks the elixir. Although he becomes a Fury, the Shinsengumi discover that he does not benefit from accelerated healing when wounded by silver weapons, thus discovering the weakness of Fury. Also, the elixir doesn't cure illness, only lessening the symptoms. Souji was sent away to Osaka because his illness got worse. He is based on the historical Okita Sōji.
Hajime Saito (斎藤 一, Saitō Hajime)
Voiced by: Kōsuke Toriumi (Japanese); Leraldo Anzaldua (English)
Saito is the leader of the Third Division who is a master of the left hand sword technique and is a skilled swordsman who evens Okita's skills. He is taciturn but also very loyal, polite, and wise. He often analyzes the situation before attacking to figure out which actions are necessary to complete the mission. However, while usually calm, once something caught his full attention, Saito hardly pay attention to his surrounding, even sometimes to the point of going into his own world. Saito left the Shinsengumi apparently to join Itou's group, but later it turns out that he was commanded by Hijikata to infiltrate Itou's group for information concerning Itou's plans. He is based on the historical Saitō Hajime.
Heisuke Toudou (藤堂 平助, Tōdō Heisuke)
Voiced by: Hiroyuki Yoshino (Japanese); Greg Ayres (English)
Heisuke is the Eighth Division captain of the Shinsengumi. He is around the same age as Chizuru and is very protective of her, being one of the first people to treat her nicely since her arrival at Shinsengumi. He is close friends with Harada and Shinpachi, mostly seen together with them. Later on, he became conflicted between his friendship with his Shinsengumi friends and his political belief. Hoping to find his answer from different perspective, Heisuke leaves the Shinsengumi, following Itou along with Saito to become members of Guardians of the Imperial Tomb. However, Heisuke eventually decide to return to protect Chizuru. After being severely injured, Heisuke drank Water of Life to recover, which causes him to struggle between his morality and his vampiric impulse. He is based on the historical Tōdō Heisuke.
Sanosuke Harada (原田 左之助, Harada Sanosuke)
Voiced by: Kōji Yusa (Japanese); Illich Guardiola (TV), Phil Hyde (Movies) (English)
Harada is the Tenth Division Captain and prefers the spear to the sword, but he is seen carrying both. He is widely popular amongst women due to his handsome feature and gentleman attitude. He is a close friend of Heisuke and Shinpachi, often hanging out together with them during their free times and together with Shinpachi likes to tease Heisuke. He has a fierce rivalry with Kyō Shiranui, pitting his spear against Shiranui's pistol. He is the only person amongst the human love interests who doesn't become a Fury in his route. He is based on the historical Harada Sanosuke.
Shinpachi Nagakura (永倉 新八, Nagakura Shinpachi)
Voiced by: Tomohiro Tsuboi (Japanese); Kalob Martinez (TV), Scott Gibbs (Movies) (English)
Shinpachi is the Second Division captain of the Shinsengumi. He is usually very cheerful, especially when he is with his comrades. Shinpachi is especially close to Harada and Heisuke, with him and Harada together often pick on the youngest captain. He is very skilled with the sword, but he is also a borderline alcoholic and womanizer, as he is seen breaking the curfew one night to be out drinking at Shimbara while enjoying the company of women. He resents Furies and refuses to even think of accepting the Water of Life, preferring to die as a warrior in battle. In the original game, he serves as a supporting character, but in Kyoto Winds and Edo Blossoms, he has his own route. In his route, he became a Fury after the dying Inoue made him drink Water of Life to protect Chizuru when being surrounded by enemies. He is based on the historical Nagakura Shinpachi.
Keisuke Sanan (山南 敬助, Sanan Keisuke)
Voiced by: Nobuo Tobita (Japanese); David Matranga (English)
He is the soft-spoken vice-commander of the Shinsengumi, along with Hijikata. Both a scholar and a ruthless tactician, he is kind and caring, albeit a bit reserved. After an injury which resulted in him being unable to use his left arm and thus wield a katana, he becomes cold and distant; he proceeds to research and improve on the Water of Life in secret in order to overcome its side effects, eventually drinking it and becoming one of the first few Fury with self control, creating the Shinsengumi's Fury Corps. He serves as supporting character or even an antagonist depending on the route taken in the original game, but has his own route in Kyoto Winds and Edo Blossoms. He is based on the historical Yamanami Keisuke, the name "Sanan" is based on the alternative reading of the kanji on his name.
Susumu Yamazaki (山崎 烝, Yamazaki Susumu)
Voiced by: Takayuki Suzuki
He is a member of the Watch, a squad whose duty is to observe the conditions of the Shinsengumi members and specialized in gathering information. He also serves as a doctor for Okita, taking care of his tuberculosis. He later shares this role with Chizuru, who also has medical knowledge due to assisting Kodo on his work. He is also assigned to protect Chizuru from afar whenever she goes out. He is quiet and rarely speak unless it's necessary, but is very loyal to the Shinsengumi, always reminding Hijikata of his responsibilities. Due to his role in the Watch, Yamazaki often laments for unable to help his comrades in battle and can only watch them die. He serves as a supporting character in the original game, but his role is then expanded in his own route in Kyoto Winds and Edo Blossoms. He is based on the historical Yamazaki Susumu.
Hachiro Iba (伊庭 八郎, Iba Hachirō)
Voiced by: Mamoru Miyano
Introduced in Kyoto Winds and Edo Blossoms, he is the eldest son of Iba Gunbei, the master of one of the most respected dojos in Japan and an old friend of Hijikata and the others during their times training at their respective dojo. A skilled swordsman despite never having killed anyone before, he is appointed as an okuzume (bodyguard) for the shogunate. He is also Chizuru's childhood friend and the one who convinced Chizuru to keep her ability hidden to avoid bullying. Determined to protect her, he began training to become swordsman in his dojo. He is reunited with Chizuru 11 years later when he helped her preventing Takeda from harassing a civilian. Even though he is disappointed that Chizuru didn't remember him, he's still in love with her and determined to protect her. In his route, he lost his left arm at Takeda's hands who became a Fury. To fight against Takeda, Iba becomes a Fury and then replaced his lost left arm with a demon arm provided by Sen. He is based on the historical Hachiro Iba.
Kazue Souma (相馬 主計, Sōma Kazue)
Voiced by: Kaji Yuki
Introduced in Kyoto Winds and Edo Blossoms, he was a soldier in shogunate's army before joining Shinsengumi. He is a passionate and hardworking young man who aims to become a true warrior. Disappointed with his colleagues in his assigned domain army and inspired by the Shinsengumi, Souma accepts Kondo's invitation to join the police force as his assistant under Chizuru's guidance together with fellow new recruit Nomura Risaburo while initially oblivious of Chizuru's real gender. Once he learned of her secret, Souma is promoted to become Kondo's page, officially becoming a member of Shinsengumi. In his route, he clashes against Itou's close younger brother, Saburo Miki, which eventually leads him into becoming a Fury after being forced to drink the Water of Life by the latter who believed it to be a poison. He is based on the historical Kazue Souma.
Ryouma Sakamoto (坂本 龍馬, Sakamoto Ryōma)
Voiced by: Daisuke Ono
Introduced in Kyoto Winds and Edo Blossoms, originally a samurai from Tosa, Sakamoto is the ronin responsible for negotiating the alliance between the Satsuma and Choshu in an effort to overthrow the shogunate. He is also acquainted with Shiranui when they worked together as bodyguards for Shinsaku Takasugi. Sakamoto believes that the Japanese government should become more like a democracy and does weapon business with several foreign countries. His controversial ideals have garnered him animosity from several other factions, including the Shinsengumi, which causes him to be at odds with the Shinsengumi members, especially Hijikata. He initially approaches Chizuru under alias Umetaro Saitani (才谷梅太郎, Saitani Umetarō) in order to get information about Shinsengumi, only to immediately grow fond of her. On the night of his assassination, the dying Sakamoto, together with his close friend Nakaoka, is turned into Fury by Kaoru and he is publicly declared dead. Using this to his advantage, he assist Chizuru in stopping Kodo, Kaoru, and Nakaoka who are building a Fury army. Despite carrying two swords, Sakamoto prefers to use gun, making him the only main character to use long-range weapon. He is based on the historical Sakamoto Ryōma.
Ryunosuke Ibuki (井吹 龍之介, Ibuki Ryūnosuke)
Voiced by: Tomokazu Seki
He is the main protagonist of Reimeiroku. He was found by Kamo Serizawa when he was beaten by thugs and took him to Shinsengumi. As he is indebted to Serizawa, Ryunosuke begrudgingly became Serizawa's personal attendant to pay him back. Even though he is made attendant, he is treated more like a servant being ordered around by Serizawa's whim. As times passed, he became closer with the other Shinsengumi members, but eventually parted ways with them to live his own life. In the enhanced port of the original game, Ryunosuke makes an appearance in several routes assisting the Shinsengumi. It's revealed that after leaving the police force, he lives together with a former maiko whom he is in love with, Shizu.

=== Supporting ===
Isami Kondou (近藤 勇, Kondō Isami)
Voiced by: Tōru Ōkawa (Japanese); David Wald (English)
Kondo is the Commander of the Shinsengumi. He is very emotional, but despite this, he has the trust, respect, and loyalty of his men. Prior to forming Shinsengumi, Kondo opens a dojo called Shiei Hall that welcomed poor people and teach them free of charge. He dies by surrendering himself to the enemy to buy some times for Hijikata and the rest of their comrades to escape. He is based on the historical Isami Kondō.
Genzaburo Inoue (井上 源三郎, Inoue Genzaburō)
Voiced by: Norio Kobayashi
He is the Sixth Division captain of the Shinsengumi. Polite and gentle, he is one of a few people who is kind to Chizuru from the very beginning. He usually helps Chizuru in getting accustomed to live with the Shinsengumi and gradually considers her as his daughter. In return, Chizuru also comes to see him as her second father figure. In all routes, he is killed during the battle of Toba-Fushimi. He is based on the historical Inoue Genzaburo.
Kai Shimada (島田 魁, Shimada Kai)
Voiced by: Takeshi Ohba
He is the corporal of the Second Division of the Shinsengumi and member of the Watch like Yamazaki. He is one of a few people other than the captains and Yamazaki who knew of Chizuru's real identity and the existence of Furies. He is based on the historical Kai Shimada.
Princess Sen (千姫, Senhime)
Voiced by: Ayano Ishikawa (Japanese); Hilary Haag (English)
Usually called "Osen", she is a young girl around Chizuru's age, with long brown hair. She is a demon princess from Yase clan who has close connection with the imperial family. Sen is first introduced when she protects a child threatened by a group of men until Chizuru and Saito jumps in to protect her. Recognizing Chizuru as a survivor of the Yukimura demon clan, Sen befriends her. She later reveals Chizuru's real heritage, even offering twice for Chizuru to come with her and Kimigiku to be better protected, but always respect her decision above all else.
Kimigiku (君菊, Kimigiku)
Voiced by: Akiko Katsuta
Real name Kikuzuki (菊月), she is a courtesan in Shimabara who is actually a kunoichi Oni whose clan is working under Sen's family, with Kimigiku being Sen's personal bodyguard. She mostly accompanies Sen wherever she goes and gathers information when working as a courtesan.
Ryojun Matsumoto (松本 良順, Matsumoto Ryōjun)
Voiced by: Akiko Katsuta
He is a physician working for the shogunate. He is an acquaintance of Kodo during his times working for the shogunate and once sent a letter for him, which Chizuru used as a clue to find her missing father that led to her going to Kyoto. As a personal shogunate physician, Matsumoto meets the Shinsengumi several times to tend their wounds. Aware of the Water of Life experiment held by Kodo and the Shinsengumi, Matsumoto is one of people who are against the continuation of the experiments due to the danger posed by the Furies. He is based on the historical Matsumoto Jun.
Keisuke Otori (大鳥 圭介, Ōtori Keisuke)
Voiced by: Yasuaki Takumi
He is an ally of Shinsengumi who is dedicated to helping modernize the shogunate forces' tactics. He is a diplomatic man who does his best to ensure the shogunate forces get through the war with as few casualties as possible. He also negotiates a peaceful surrender after the Battle of Hakodate. He is based on the historical Ōtori Keisuke.
Takeaki Enomoto (榎本 武揚, Enomoto Takeaki)
Voiced by: Eiji Itou
He is the second-in-command of the shogunate navy and captain of its flagship, the Kaiyomaru. He eventually becomes the President of the Republic of Ezo. He is based on the historical Enomoto Takeaki.
Kotaro Motoyama (本山 小太郎, Motoyama Kotarō)
Voiced by: Wataru Hatano
He is a friend of Iba introduced in Kyoto Winds and Edo Blossoms. He is very shy, causing him to feel jumpy and stutter around the Shinsengumi. He is relaxed and talkative only when he is with Iba, whom he likes to tease regarding his feelings for Chizuru. Comically, he is usually rendered a third-wheel whenever Iba and Chizuru are having a moment in Iba's route. He is based on the historical Kotaro Motoyama.
Risaburo Nomura (野村 利三郎, Nomura Risaburō)
Voiced by: Takuya Eguchi
He is first introduced as a new recruit of the Shinsengumi in Kyoto Winds and Edo Blossoms, prominently in Souma's route. Together with Souma, he became Kondo's assistant under Chizuru's guidance, and later officially became his page after learning Chizuru's real gender when he and Souma defended her from Miki. He is based on the historical Risaburo Nomura.
Hyougo Sakai (酒井 兵庫, Sakai Hyōgo)
Voiced by: Shouta Aoi
He is the accountant of the Shinsengumi who is introduced in the 2021 adaptation of Hakuoki OVA. When he accompanied Chizuru to take the Shinsengumi's haori, they were attacked by ronins from Tosa and he was severely injured protecting Chizuru. While Chizuru drove the enemies' attention away, Kaoru, disguised as Chizuru, found and offered the Water of Life to him, turning him into a Fury. After he went out of control due to the double dose of Water of Life, he was eventually slain by Hijikata, but died peacefully after learning that Chizuru was safe.

=== Antagonists ===
Kodo Yukimura (雪村 綱道, Yukimura Kōdō)
Voiced by: Ryūgo Saitō (Japanese); Mark X. Laskowski (English)
He is Chizuru's father who went missing a month before the story. He is the one who creates the Water of Life under the shogunate order that resulted with the birth of Fury. He approached Shinsengumi and used several of its members as test subject before he left. It's later revealed that he's actually a member of Yukimura clan and is not related to Chizuru by blood; he adopted Chizuru after the Yukimura clan's massacre and raised her without telling her of her real heritage. Chizuru remembers her father as kind and loving man who would help people in need, while in reality Kodo deems the way demon lives in isolation outdated, resulting in his obsession to create Furies. His motivations in building a Fury army differs depending on the routes that the player choose.
Kaoru Nagumo (南雲 薫, Nagumo Kaoru)
Voiced by: Hasumi Itō (Japanese); Shannon Emerick (English)
First seen as a lovely dressed young woman who was saved by Okita from ronins who greatly resembles Chizuru. Kaoru is actually Chizuru's older twin brother who was separated from her during childhood when their clan was massacred. When they were separated, he was taken in by the Nagumo family who mistreated him for not being a girl, and thus, unable to produce heirs for them; which lead him to crossdress as a woman. The loss of his entire clan and the abuse he suffered under the Nagumo family had caused Kaoru to develop mixed feeling for Chizuru, hating and loving her at the same time for living a happy life without remembering him. He has been working with Kodo on his research on the Water of Life to create a Fury army so they can conquer Japan and restore the Yukimura clan. Kaoru is the wielder of the katana that with Chizuru's kodachi forms a set, both of which are the Yukimura clan's heirlooms.
Chikage Kazama (風間 千景, Kazama Chikage)
Voiced by: Kenjirō Tsuda (Japanese); Corey Hartzog (English)
He is the strongest pureblood demon of the West and the head of Kazama clan who is working for the Satsuma domain. Kazama is usually followed by his two demon companions Amagiri and Shiranui, and it is implied by Sen that he is a royal blood, like her. He is after Chizuru, so that they can mate and create stronger pureblood demon. Unfortunately, his attempts to take Chizuru is always thwarted by the interference of the Shinsengumi. Selfish, arrogant, and often cruel, Kazama is severely prejudiced against humans, and even more so against Furies whom he refers as "fakes." He assists the Satsuma clan simply to repay the debt of his ancestor and immediately cut ties with them once his obligation is over. However, he is not completely ruthless as he outwardly make himself. He has an extreme sense of responsibility and loyalty to his clan and people as a whole, prioritising the order and safety of his clan. He initially always pursues Chizuru simply to preserve their race and as an excuse to toy with the Shinsengumi, but gradually becomes interested in her as a person and curious with the way the Shinsengumi walk their path as warriors.
Kyuju Amagiri (天霧 九寿, Amagiri Kyūju)
Voiced by: Ryū Yamaguchi (Japanese); Steven Fenley (English)
He is a strong red-haired demon, who prefers to fight with his fists instead of a sword. He's usually seen by Kazama's side, since he works for him. He usually becomes Kazama's voice of reason, stopping him from getting out of hand and reminds him of his duty as the head of Kazama clan. Amagiri dislike fighting needlessly and often tells his opponents not to fight him in a polite manner. He is rather respectful of his enemies, not even taunting them when in battle.
Kyo Shiranui (不知火 匡, Shiranui Kyō)
Voiced by: Hiroaki Yoshida (Japanese); Houston Hayes (English)
He is a cocky, arrogant demon who prefers guns over swords who works for the Chōsu. He has long, purple wavy hair which he wears in a ponytail. While he is shown to assist Kazama and Amagiri against the Shinsengumi (and particularly, Harada), in order to abduct Chizuru under Kazama's orders, he is actually not Kazama's subordinate like Amagiri is. He doesn't belittle humans, even forming a close friendship with Takasugi Shinsaku before the latter's death. He's also acquainted with Sakamoto during their times together working as Takasugi's bodyguards.
Kanryusai Takeda (武田 観柳斎, Takeda Kanryūsai)
Voiced by: Takehito Koyasu
He is the Fifth Division captain of the Shinsengumi and the main antagonist in Iba's route in Kyoto Winds and Edo Blossoms. Cruel and arrogant, his primary objective is to attain as much power as possible by any means necessary even if it means going against the Shinsengumi's strict code and morale. Dissatisfied with his position in the Shinsengumi, he resigns shortly after Itou's departure. He steals a Water of Life from Sanan's room with intention to make a name for himself by exposing the existence of Furies, but this was thwarted by Iba and Chizuru. However, he is found by Kodo and becomes a Fury. Having lost his right arm against Iba, Takeda invades Yase village and steals the right arm of a demon protected by Sen's clan to increase his power. He is based on the historical Takeda Kanryūsai.
Saburo Miki (三樹 三郎, Miki Saburō)
Voiced by: Takashi Kondō
He is the Ninth Division captain of the Shinsengumi and the main antagonist in Souma's route in Kyoto Winds and Edo Blossoms. He is Itou's younger brother who has the tendency to mock the other Shinsengumi captains while flaunting his brother's superiority. He is perceptive enough to deduce Chizuru's true gender and made attempts to expose her before leaving the Shinsengumi. After Itou was killed under Kondo and Hijikata's order for planning to kill the Shinsengumi Chief and his corpse was used as a bait, Miki harbors strong hatred against the Shinsengumi and swears revenge, defecting to the Satsuma-Chōsu alliance for the sole purpose of annihilating the Shinsengumi. After being defeated by Souma, he meets Kodo and becomes a Fury to continue his quest for vengeance. He is based on the historical Suzuki Mikisaburo.
Shintaro Nakaoka (中岡 慎太郎, Nakaoka Shintarō)
Voiced by: Daisuke Hirakawa
He is a close friend of Ryouma introduced in Kyoto Winds and Edo Blossoms in Ryouma's route, and later became one of the main antagonists in the latter's route. He loyally accompanies Ryouma until he is killed together with him by a faction who is against Ryouma's controversial ideal. Kodo and Kaoru uses the assassination as an opportunity to change Nakaoka and Ryouma into Furies, saving their lives. Believing that Shinsengumi were the ones who killed them and resentful of the high-ranking people who mistreated him and his comrades, Nakaoka join forces with Kodo and Kaoru to get revenge on all high-ranking people in Japan and fulfils his and Ryouma's original goal to reform Japan. He is based on the historical Nakaoka Shintarō.
Kamo Serizawa (芹沢 鴨, Serizawa Kamo)
Voiced by: Jouji Nakata
He was the former Head Commander of Roshigumi which later become the Shinsengumi. He found and saved Ryunosuke from hunger to make the youth owe him, so that Ryunosuke couldn't refuse to become his page. Even though he took Ryunosuke as his page, he treated him more like a servant. He is cruel and tyrannical, harming people that displeases him even for a simple reason, which causes animosity between him and most of Shinsengumi members, mainly Kondo and Hijikata. Despite this, the Shinsengumi members couldn't deny that regardless of his wrongdoings, Serizawa was the one who kept them well-fed for years. He eventually became a Fury, leading him to be killed.

== Media ==
The Hakuoki series of otome visual novels were released for the PlayStation 2, PlayStation 3, PlayStation 4, PlayStation Portable, PlayStation Vita, Nintendo DS, Nintendo 3DS, Nintendo Switch, iOS and Android by Idea Factory. Two of the games have been published in English by Aksys Games in North America on PlayStation Portable. Rising Star Games renewed partnership with Idea Factory to bring two of their Hakuoki games to PAL territories. The first game is a port of Hakuoki: Demon of the Fleeting Blossom with added story content. Two more ports, Hakuoki: Kyoto Winds and Hakuoki: Edo Blossoms, were released with additional routes and story contents.

- Hakuoki: Shinsengumi Kitan (薄桜鬼 〜新選組奇譚〜)
  - PlayStation 2: September 18, 2008
  - PlayStation Portable: August 27, 2009
  - Nintendo DS: March 18, 2010
  - Nintendo 3DS: November 24, 2011
- Hakuoki: Zuisouroku (薄桜鬼 随想録)
  - PlayStation 2: August 27, 2009
  - PlayStation Portable: August 26, 2010
  - Nintendo DS: February 17, 2011
  - PlayStation Vita: February 19, 2015
- Hakuoki: Junsouroku (薄桜鬼 巡想録)
  - PlayStation 3: June 17, 2010
- Hakuoki: Demon of the Fleeting Blossom (Release for North America, published by Aksys Games)
  - PlayStation Portable: February 14, 2012
- Hakuoki: Warriors of the Shinsengumi (Release for North America, published by Aksys Games)
  - PlayStation Portable: February 19, 2013
- Hakuoki: Memories of the Shinsengumi (Release for North America and Europe, published by Aksys Games (North America) and Rising Star Games (Europe))
  - Nintendo 3DS: September 19, 2013
- Hakuoki: Stories of the Shinsengumi (Release for North America, published by Aksys Games)
  - PlayStation 3: May 6, 2014
- Hakuoki: Kyoto Winds (薄桜鬼 真改 風ノ章, Hakuoki: Shinkai – Kaze no Shou)
  - PlayStation Vita: September 25, 2015
  - PlayStation Vita: May 16, 2017 (North America), May 19, 2017 (Europe)
  - Steam: August 24, 2017
- Hakuoki: Edo Blossoms (薄桜鬼 真改 華ノ章, Hakuoki: Shinkai – Hana no Shou)
  - PlayStation Vita: June 16, 2016
  - PlayStation Vita and Steam (English): March 13, 2018 (North America), March 16, 2018 (Europe)
- Hakuoki: Chronicles of Wind and Blossom (薄桜鬼 真改 風華伝, Hakuoki: Shinkai Fuukaden)
  - PlayStation 4: July 13, 2017
  - Nintendo Switch: September 6, 2018
  - Nintendo Switch (English version by Eastasiasoft): August 1, 2024
- Hakuoki: Shinkai for iOS & Android (薄桜鬼 真改 for iOS & Android)
  - iOS/Android: December 12, 2018

=== Prequel ===
Following the success of the original game, a prequel titled Hakuoki: Reimeiroku (薄桜鬼 黎明録) is released on October 28, 2010, for PlayStation 2, and later ported to the Nintendo Switch on August 26, 2021. The prequel focuses on a young man named Ryunosuke Ibuki, who is saved by the leader of Roshigumi (the old name of Shinsengumi), Kamo Serizawa, and then forced to join Roshigumi as his page to repay his debt. Similar to the original game, it consists of six routes of the same characters where Ibuki is required to make the right choice to form friendship with each main characters of their respective routes. In all routes, Ibuki always ends up leaving the Shinsengumi to start a new life of his own. Reaching the good ending of the routes would show the continuation of the ending of respective Shinsengumi members with Chizuru from the original game after war ends. Two updated versions of the game, Hakuoki: Reimeiroku Nagorigusa (薄桜鬼 黎明録 名残り草) and Hakuoki: Reimeiroku – Omouhase Kara (薄桜鬼 黎明録 思馳せ空), are released for PlayStation 3 on June 28, 2012, and PlayStation Vita on July 2, 2015, respectively.

=== Spin-offs ===
Several spin-off were released not long after the original game, ranging from mini games to action RPG. The first spin-off, Hakuoki: Yuugiroku (薄桜鬼 遊戯録) is released for PlayStation Portable on August 26, 2010. Unlike the original game that requires the player to choose the right options to romance the chosen bachelor, Yuugiroku requires player to play mini games based on traditional Japanese games. A sequel, Hakuoki: Yuugiroku Ni – Matsuri Hayashi to Taishitachi (薄桜鬼 遊戯録弐 祭囃子と隊士達), is released on October 18, 2012, this time with the theme of games found on festival stalls. An updated version of both games, Hakuoki: Yuugiroku Tai-shi-tachi no dai enkai (薄桜鬼 遊戯録 隊士達の大宴会), which includes both games and additional content based on Kyoto Winds and Edo Blossoms, is released on November 17, 2016, for PlayStation Vita, it was later released for Nintendo Switch on March 28, 2024.

The action RPG games of the series, Hakuoki: Bakumatsu Musouroku (薄桜鬼 幕末無双録) and Hakuoki: Kyoukaroku (薄桜鬼 鏡花録) are released on March 22, 2012, for PlayStation Vita and December 19, 2013, for PlayStation Vita, respectively. The game tells the Shinsengumi members in alternate universe.

Urakata Hakuoki (裏語 薄桜鬼) is released on June 27, 2013, for PlayStation Portable. The story is set in the same universe and timeline as the original game, but tells a non-canonical alternate story. The game focuses on Kozue Kirishima, who seeks out the Shinsengumi after her older brother was killed by a Shinsengumi member who became a Rasetsu. The game consisted of four different bachelor routes. Unlike the original game that requires little interactions, Urakata Hakuoki is an action RPG, in which the player plays as Kozue, moving her freely on Map Screen, exploring areas where she can get various items, and battling enemies. The game later received an updated version titled Urakata Hakuoki: Akatsuki no Shirabe (裏語 薄桜鬼～暁の調べ～) on August 7, 2014.

Hakuoki SSL: Sweet School Life (薄桜鬼 SSL), released for PlayStation Vita on March 27, 2014, unlike the other games, the story is set in modern times with Chizuru and the other characters from the original game introduced as students or teachers going to the same school. The game was released on the Nintendo Switch on June 23, 2023, an English version was announced for the second half of 2025, it was later released on February 12, 2026, by Eastasiasoft.

Hakuoki Memoirs: Drifting Clouds' (薄桜鬼 真改 天雲ノ抄, Hakuouki Shinkai: Ten'un no Shou) was released on October 6, 2022, for the Nintendo Switch as a fan disc for the original game. The game will be released in English by eastasiasoft in 2027.

Hakuōki Ibun: Berezinskii no Majo (薄桜鬼異聞 ベレジンスキーの魔女) was announced by Otomate in February 2024. At the Otomate Party 2025, further details were revelead about the cast. The story takes place in early 19th century in Eastern Europe, around the time Napoleon's invasion of Russia. The game was originally meant to be released on August 27, 2026; however, it was postponed to December 10, 2026.

Some characters from the Hakuoki series are featured in the PSP game B's LOG Party, released on May 20, 2010.

=== Manga ===
There are two manga adaptations of Hakuoki: Shinsengumi Kitan. The first, entitled Hakuoki Junrenka, is serialized in the shōjo manga magazine Dengeki Comic SYLPH, and is an anthology of the different endings available in the video games. Another adaptation is currently serialized in Comic B's Log Kyun!!.

- Hakuoki Jurenka (薄桜鬼 巡恋華)

No.	Release date	ISBN
1	March 23, 2010	978-4048684958
2	October 22, 2010	978-4048689847

- Hakuoki

No.	Release date	ISBN
1	September 22, 2010	978-4048689182
2	February 22, 2011	978-4048703413
3	July 22, 2011	978-4048706223
4	October 22, 2011	978-4048708906

=== Anime ===
An anime adaptation was announced at the Otomate Party 2009. The game was adapted into 22-episode anime television series split into two seasons, produced by Studio Deen and directed by Osamu Yamasaki; Hakuoki: Demon of the Fleeting Blossom aired from April 4 to June 20, 2010, and Hakuoki: Record of the Jade Blood aired from October 10 to December 12, 2010. A 6-episode OVA series, Hakuoki: A Memory of Snow Flowers adapting from Hakuoki: Stories of Shinsengumi was produced under the same staff and cast and was released from August 5, 2011, to July 7, 2012. Following the OVA release, a 12-episodes prequel adapting from Hakuoki: Dawn of the Shinsengumi was also released from July 9 to September 24, 2012. After the success of the TV series, Studio Deen released two anime films, which are the alternate retelling of the game. The first film, Hakuoki: Wild Dance of Kyoto was released on August 24, 2013, and the second film Hakuoki: Warrior Spirit of the Blue Sky was released on March 8, 2014. A 12-episode short anime adaptation of a new instalment of the game, titled Hakuoki: Otogisōshi, was produced by DLE and aired from April 5 to June 28, 2016. A new three-part OVA adaptation by Studio Deen was released from November 14, 2021, to January 24, 2022. The staff from the first anime series returned to produce the series.

==== Series overview ====
Season	Episodes	Originally released		Title
Season	Episodes	First released	Last released	Title
1	12	April 4, 2010	June 20, 2010	Hakuoki: Demon of the Fleeting Blossom
2	10	October 10, 2010	December 12, 2010	Hakuoki: Record of the Jade Blood
3	6	August 5, 2011	July 7, 2012	Hakuoki: A Memory of Snow Flowers – OVA
4	12	July 9, 2012	September 24, 2012	Hakuoki: Dawn of the Shinsengumi
5	1	August 24, 2013	August 24, 2013	Hakuoki: Wild Dance of Kyoto – Movie
6	1	March 8, 2014	March 8, 2014	Hakuoki: Warrior Spirit of the Blue Sky – Movie
7	3	November 13, 2021	January 29, 2022	Hakuoki: OVA 2021

==== Opening and Ending Songs ====
Season	Song title	Artist
Hakuoki OP	"Izayoi Namida" (十六夜涙, Izayoi Tears)	Aika Yoshioka
Hakuoki ED	"Kimi no Kioku" (君ノ記憶, Your Memory)	Mao
Hakuoki: Hekketsuroku OP	"Maikaze" (舞風, Dancing Wind)	Aika Yoshioka
Hakuoki: Hekketsuroku ED	"Akane Sora ni Negau" (茜空に願ふ, Wish on the Deep Red Sky)	Mao
Hakuoki: Reimeiroku OP	"Reimei -reimei-" (黎鳴 -reimei-, Reverberation -reverberation-)	Maon Kurosaki
Hakuoki: Reimeiroku ED	"Hana no Atosaki" (花のあとさき, After the Flowers)	Mao
Hakuoki: Sekkaroku OP	"Yume no Ukifune" (夢ノ浮舟, Dream Boat)	Aika Yoshioka
Hakuoki: Sekkaroku ED 01 (Souji Okita)	"Mugen -A True Love Tale-" (夢幻 -A True Love Tale-, Fantasy -A True Love Tale-)	Maon Kurosaki
Hakuoki: Sekkaroku ED 02 (Hajime Saitou)	"Kazahana -The Whisper of the Snow Falling-" (斎藤 -The Whisper of the Snow Falling-, Snow Wind Flower -The Whisper of the Snow Falling-)	Maon Kurosaki
Hakuoki: Sekkaroku ED 03 (Sanosuke Harada)	"Araragi -The End of Struggle-" (蘭 -The End of Struggle-, Orchid -The End of Struggle-)	Maon Kurosaki
Hakuoki: Sekkaroku ED 04 (Heisuke Toudou)	"Hikari -I Promise You-" (光 -I Promise You-, Light -I Promise You-)	Maon Kurosaki
Hakuoki: Sekkaroku ED 05 (Toshizou Hijikata)	"Shinjitsu -The Light Lasting-" (真実 -The Light Lasting-, Truth -The Light Lasting-)	Maon Kurosaki
Hakuoki: Sekkaroku ED 06 (Chikage Kazama)	"Hiyoku -Contract With You-" (比翼 -Contract With You-, Wings Abreast -Contract With You-)	Maon Kurosaki
Hakuoki OVA OP	"Setsuna no Kodō" (刹那の鼓動, Split-Second Heartbeat)	Aika Yoshioka
Hakuoki OVA ED	"Kenran -I'll Never Forget You-" (絢爛 -I'll Never Forget You–, Gorgeous -I'll Never Forget You–)	Maon Kurosaki

=== Stage play and musical ===
Since April 2012 Hakuoki is adapted as a musical. Up till now there are thirteen productions. Nobuhiro Mori has written the script and were responsible for the whole production. Toshihiko Sahashi wrote the music. The musical includes aside from the usual dancing and singing also sword fights, which were supervised by Yuta Morokaji, Shinnosuke Motoyama and Yasuhiro Roppongi.

The productions so far were:

1.→ Musical Hakuoki – Hajime Saitou's Route『ミュージカル『薄桜鬼』〜斎藤一篇〜』 27. April – 8. May 2012

2.→ Musical Hakuoki – Souji Okita's Route 『ミュージカル『薄桜鬼』〜沖田総司篇〜』14. – 24. March 2013

3.→ Musical Hakuoki – Toshizou Hijikata's Route 『ミュージカル『薄桜鬼』〜土方歳三篇〜』2. – 11. October 2013

4.→ Musical Hakuoki – HAKUMYU LIVE 『ミュージカル『薄桜鬼』HAKU-MYU LIVE』4, 5 January 2014

5.→ Musical Hakuoki – Chikage Kazama's Route 『ミュージカル『薄桜鬼』〜風間千景篇〜』16. – 18. May, 23. May – 1. June 2014

6.→ Musical Hakuoki – Heisuke Toudou's Route 『ミュージカル『薄桜鬼』〜藤堂平助篇〜』10. – 12. January, 25. – 17. January 2015

7.→ Musical Hakuoki – Reimeiroku 『ミュージカル『薄桜鬼』〜黎明録〜』 – 2015年5月23日〜31日 23. – 31. May, 10. -14. June 2015

8.→ Musical Hakuoki – Shinsengumi Kitan 『ミュージカル『薄桜鬼』〜新選組奇譚〜』4. – 11. January, 15. – 17. January 2016

9.→ Musical Hakuoki – HAKUMYU LIVE 2 『ミュージカル『薄桜鬼』HAKU-MYU LIVE 2』12. -13. August, 16. – 17. August 2016

10.→ Musical Hakuoki – Sanosuke Harada's Route 『ミュージカル『薄桜鬼』〜原田左之助篇〜』14. – 16. April, 26. – 30. April 2017

11.→ Musical Hakuoki Shitan – Toshizou Hijikata's Route 『ミュージカル『薄桜鬼 志譚』〜土方歳三篇〜』21. – 23. April, 28. April – 1. May 2018

12.→ Musical Hakuoki Shitan – Chikage Kazama's Route 『ミュージカル『薄桜鬼 志譚』〜風間千景篇〜』5. – 11. April, 18. – 21. April

13.→ Musical Hakuoki Shinkai – Kazue Souma's Route 『ミュージカル『薄桜鬼 真改 』〜相馬主計篇〜』previously scheduled 2. – 5. April, 9. – 12. 2020, but due to the situation caused by the COVID-19-Pandemic postponed to 1. – 4. April, 8. – 11. April 2021

14.→ Musical Hakuoki Shinkai – Hajime Saitou's Route『ミュージカル『薄桜鬼 真改』〜斎藤一篇〜』22. – 27. April, 1. – 5. May 2022

15.→ Musical Hakuoki – HAKUMYU LIVE 3 『ミュージカル『薄桜鬼』HAKU-MYU LIVE 3』29. – 30. October, 11. – 13. November

16.→ Musical Hakuoki Shinkai – San'nan Keisuke's route『ミュージカル『薄桜鬼 真改』～山南敬助篇～』8. – 16. April, 22. – 23. April 2023

17.→ Musical Hakuoki Shinkai – Hijikata Toshizou's route『ミュージカル『薄桜鬼 真改』～土方歳三篇～』13. – 29. April 2024

18.→ Musical Hakuoki Shinkai – Toudou Heisuke's route『ミュージカル『薄桜鬼 真改』～藤堂平助篇～』21. – 29. June 2025

19.→ Musical Hakuoki – HAKUMYU LIVE 4 『ミュージカル『薄桜鬼』HAKU-MYU LIVE 4』19. – 21. December, 27. – 28. December 2025

==== Cast ====
The blue background marks the main role

	2012 Saitou's Route	2013 Okita's Route	2013 Hijikata's Route	2014 HAKU-MYU LIVE	2014 Kazama's Route	2015 Toudou's Route	2015 Reimeiroku	2016 Shinsengumi Kitan	2016 HAKU-MYU LIVE2	2017 Harada's Route	2018 Hijikata's Route II	2019 Kazama's Route II	2021 Souma's Route	2022 Saito's Route II	2022 HAKU-MYU LIVE3	2023 Sannan's route	2024 Hijikata's route III	2025 Toudou's route II	2025 HAKU-MYU LIVE4
Hajime Saitou	Ryo Matsuda	Ryo Matsuda				Shohei Hashimoto				Takeru Naya		Tomoru Akazawa	Shoichiro Omi	Shohei Hashimoto	Shoichiro Omi/Shohei Hashimoto	Shoichiro Omi			
Souji Okita	Daisuke Hirose	Daisuke Hirose	Daisuke Hirose				Yoshihiko Aramaki				Shogo Yamazaki		Shogo Yamazaki →Shuji Kikuchi	Kitamura Kento	Shuji Kikuchi/ Kento Kitamura	Kento Kitamura			
Toshizou Hijikata	Hiroshi Yazaki		Hiroshi Yazaki	Hiroshi Yazaki		Yuki Izawa	Yoshihide Sasaki	Gaku Matsuda	Gaku Matsuda		Masanari Wada	Masanari Wada	Hidetoshi Kubota				Hidetoshi Kubota	Hidetoshi Kubota	
Chikage Kazama	Shogo Suzuki				Shogo Suzuki	Shogo Suzuki	-	Shogo Suzuki		Yoshihide Sasaki	Masataka Nakagauchi	Masataka Nakagauchi	Yoshihide Sasaki →Shogo Suzuki	Shogo Suzuki	Masataka Nakagauchi; Yoshihide Sasaki (only in the Tokyo performance)	Yoshihide Sasaki			
Heisuke Toudou	Junya Ikeda					Junya Ikeda	Ren Ozawa		Tsubasa Kidzu		Yuta Higuchi							Yuta Higuchi	Yuta Higuchi
Chizuru Yukimura	Hitomi Yoshida	Sayaka Yamamoto	Mika Kikuchi	Hitomi Yoshida Sayaka Yamamoto Mika Kikuchi	Maho Tomita	Marina Tanoue	-	Yumi Fujikoso		Karin Isobe	Marina Mori	Sakiho Motonishi	Risa Matsuzaki	Makiura Itsuki	Makiura Itsuki/Sakiho Motonishi/Risa Matsuzaki	Shion Aoki	Ruri Takeno	Mayuko Okada	Shion Aoki/ Ruri Takeno/ Okada Mayuko
Sanosuke Harada	Kento Ono				Maasa Igarashi		Keisuke Higashi			Keisuke Higashi	Satō Rui	Atomu Mizuishi	Shota Kawakami						
Nagakura Shinpachi	Shuto Miyazaki						Hiroki Ino		Shodai Fukuyama		Yuta Kishimoto		Yuta Kishimoto →Koike Ryosuke	Koike Ryosuke					
Susumu Yamazaki	Hirokazu Amano	-	Takuya Kawaharada		Shota Takasaki						Taizo Shiina					Tsukasa Taguchi			
Genzaburou Inuoe	Masaru Mori	-	Naotaka Horiike	-															
Keisuke Sannan	-		Ryousuke Mikata				Teruma	-		Teruma						Teruma	Ryuusei Maruyama	Teruma	Teruma/ Ryuusei Maruyama
Isami Kondou	-	Taira Imata																	
Kyo Shiranui	Yusuke Kashiwagi						-	Yusuke Kashiwagi			Kentaro Menjo	Takuma Sueno							
Kyuujuu Amagiri	Shunji Shimizu	Katsuya Kobayashi		-	Naoya Gomoto		-	Naoya Gomoto	-	Sotaro	Kentarou Kanezaki		Masafumi Yokoyama						
Yukimura Koudo	Edogawa Manju									Hiroyuki Kawamoto									
Kaoru Nagumo	-	Hiroki Suzuki	-	Hiroki Suzuki	-											Yuzuki Hoshimoto	-		Yuzuki Hoshimoto
Keisuke Otori	-		Takafumi Maeuchi		-						Taito Hashimoto	-					Yuta Iiyama	-	Yuta Iiyama
Princess Sen	-					Erika Yanagita	-											Mizuki Saitou	
Ryousuke Ibuki	-						Atsushi Shiramata	-	Atsushi Shiramata	-									
Serizawa Kamo	-						Akira Kubodera			-									
Nishiki Niimi	-						Koki Shinozaki	-											
Kazue Soume	-												Mizuki Umetsu	-					
Saburou Miki	-												Allen Kohatsu →Shuya Sunagawa	-	Shuya Sunagawa	-			
Risaburou Nomura	-												Masashi Sonomura	-					

== Reception ==
=== Game ===
Hakuoki received positive review. Metacritic gave the PSP version of the game the score of 79 based on 4 Critic reviews, which is a generally favorable review. The game is praised for its story-telling, character designs and development, and CG art. But has mixed review about the music and Kazama's route that is deemed too short compared to the other routes. The updated remake of the game, Kyoto Winds and Edo Blossoms also received positive review. Kyoto Winds is given the score of 83 from the same site based on 8 Critic reviews, once again praising the remake for its solid characters and story-telling. Edo Blossoms is given the score of 75, also from the same site, based on 9 Critic reviews, praising the inclusion of new characters that give fans new perceptive, but feels that the story's finale is not quite as interesting as its beginning. The decision to split the remake into two games also gained mixed review. Similarly, Hardcore Gamer praised the game for its story-telling, finding the focus of political and fantasy aspects in historical background is a different approach in otome game. The characters are also well-received, finding their struggle throughout the game relatable. The site also praised the inclusion of additional events and terminology highlighted during conversations for an easy glossary look up, though criticised the lack of interactive element within the game.

=== Anime ===
Theron Martin from Anime News Network give the first season a positive review. He praised the studio's way of properly integrating fantasy element into the actual history, the design of the male characters, and the music for using heavy, dark tones for its action and dramatic scenes, which "lends intensity and even an occasional amount of creepiness to the content." However, he criticised the plotlines about Chizuru looking for her father and the motivations of the various devils afoot in the setting are not handled properly due to the history portrayed in the series. He also criticised Chizuru's role as a heroine for following the typical reverse harem protagonist being damsel-in-distress that needs to be rescued.

THEM praised the well-executed art and the amount of depth and genuine drama in the story and the action scenes. The site also praised the studio for balancing Chizuru's character as being more dynamic than the standard female samurai era character tropes without anywhere near an idealized Mary Sue. The site finds the use of Rasetsu plot device repetitive, causing a lack of plot twists and surprise revelation in the series. The second season is praised for the characterization, while still finds the pacing and animation quality not balanced properly.
