= Kassam =

Kassam may refer to:

- Kassam (surname), with a list of people of this name
- Kassam Stadium, home ground of Oxford United Football Club, England
- Alternative spelling of Qassam, the armed branch of an Islamic movement
  - Qassam rocket, a weapon used by Hamas against Israel
    - By extension, any rocket used in Palestinian rocket attacks on Israel
