= Kazama =

Kazama (Japanese: 風間) is a Japanese surname. Notable people with the surname include:

- Eiichi Kazama (風間 栄一; 1916–2001), Japanese sport wrestler
- Kenji Kazama (風間 健; born 1943), Japanese martial artist and actor
- Kensuke Kazama, photographer
- Sadao Kazama (born 1940), Greco-Roman wrestler
- Shinji Kazama, motorcyclist
- Shunsuke Kazama, actor
- Toshiomi Kazama, Mixed Martial Arts Fighter
- Yasuyuki Kazama, driver
- Yūto Kazama, voice actor

== Fictional characters ==
- Akira Kazama, Rival Schools and Project Justice character
- Asuka Kazama, Tekken character
- Chikage Kazama, a character in the Hakuōki video game series
- Daigo Kazama, Rival Schools and Project Justice character
- Daisuke Kazama, a character in the tokusatsu series Kamen Rider Kabuto
- Jin Kazama, Tekken character
- Jun Kazama, Tekken character
- Kazuki Kazama, Samurai Shodown character
- Kenji Kazama, main character in the anime and manga D-Frag
- Kirito Kazama, a character in the Little Battlers Experience W video game and anime series
- Shin Kazama, the main character of Area 88
- Shinji Kazama, Full Metal Panic! character
- Sogetsu Kazama, Samurai Shodown character
- Soya Kazama, World Trigger character
- Tōru Kazama, Crayon Shin-chan character
- Shintaro Kazama, a character in Yakuza series.
- Joji Kazama, a character from Yakuza 3.
