= Qasam =

Qasam may refer to:

- Qasam (film), a Pakistani film
- Qasam, Yemen, a village

== See also ==
- Kasam (disambiguation)
- Qassam (disambiguation)
