= List of Hakuoki: A Memory of Snow Flowers episodes =

Hakuoki: A Memory of Snow Flowers
- No. of episodes: 6

Release
- Original network: TV Kanagawa, Chiba TV, TV Saitama, KBS Kyoto, Sun TV, AT-X, Tokyo MX TV, TV Aichi
- Original release: August 5, 2011 – July 7, 2012

Series chronology
- ← Previous; Hakuoki: Record of the Jade Blood Next → Hakuoki: Dawn of the Shinsengumi

Hakuoki: A Memory of Snow Flowers (Hakuoki ~Sekkaroku~, lit. Demon of the Fleeting Blossom: A Memory of Snow Flowers) is an OVA series which takes place in between episodes 8 and 9 of the first season of Hakuoki, with each episode being told from six different characters' perspective. It is produced by Studio Deen under the same staff and cast.

The opening song is "Yume no Ukifune" by Aika Yoshioka and the ending theme is "Mugen ~A True Love Tale~" for episode 1, "Kazahana – The Whisper of the Snow Falling -" for episode 2, "Araragi – The End of Struggle -" for episode 3, "Hikari – I Promise You -" for episode 4, "Shinjitsu – The Light Lasting -" for episode 5, and "Hiyoku – Contract With You -" for episode 6.

== Episode list ==
No. in season	Title	Original release date
1	"The Snowy White Dream"; Transliteration: "Okita Souji-Genya no Shirayuki" (Japanese: 第一章 玄夜の白雪)	August 5, 2011
Soji Okita is playing with children while Chizuru Yukimura is sweeping. However, when the children started to badmouth Commander Isami Kondo, Okita scare them away before taking Chizuru to a patrol. They meet Sen who informed them there are suspicious group of ronins planning on attacking the Shinsengumi. Okita goads Chizuru into working undercover as a geisha. Okita's tuberculosis starts to plague him, but Okita dismiss it as a cold. Kondo becomes worried and orders Okita to be grounded. Chizuru goes out with the gang to celebrate her successful undercover mission, and Shinpachi Nagakura gets into a drunken brawl on the way back, so she returns ahead with Okita. The next morning, Kondo personally dices spring onion into the porridge he asks Chizuru to cook for Okita, and the latter finishes it all despite his distaste for the plant.
2	"The Winter's Banked Fire"; Transliteration: "Saitou Hajime-Fuyu no Uzumibi" (Japanese: 第二章 冬の埋み火)	August 26, 2011
Hajime Saito is attracted by a fine sword in a display case and rattles on about the importance of a good sword to Chizuru, who starts laughing at his passionate outburst. Flashback at the Shinsengumi, Chizuru is asked to be an undercover geisha by Kondo and Toshizo Hijikata. Chizuru becomes extremely uncomfortable at the thought of the dangerous mission, but Saito immediately proffers himself and Susumu Yamazaki as bodyguards for Chizuru. Two lecherous men try to get fresh with Chizuru and are grounded by Yamazaki and Saito respectively. Upon seeing the beautifully dolled up Chizuru, Saito becomes oblivious to the surroundings and prepares to stutter a praise, but is rudely interrupted by his attacker's allies. The next day, Saito and Chizuru converse on the road about what Saito wanted to say to Chizuru, but Chizuru wanders off to the topic of whether Hijikata suits having a beard. At night, Hijikata apologises to Saito for sending him off on a long and dangerous reconnaissance mission. The next morning, Saito admires the snow together with Chizuru, who gives him a snow rabbit.
3	"The Spear that Slices the Sky"; Transliteration: "Harada Sanosuke-Kuusaku Yari" (Japanese: 第三章 空裂く槍)	September 30, 2011
Sanosuke Harada takes Chizuru out shopping for groceries and meet Bakufu inspectors on the way back ripping apart the belongings of civilians during checks and roughing them up. Chizuru becomes affected and so does Harada. When a man loses his letter for home, he is stopped by the inspectors and accused of treason. The incensed Harada attacks the officers trying to arrest the hapless man and vouches on seppuku that he will bring the letter back. Kyo Shiranui sees the commotion while on a watchtower and helps a flustered Chizuru overcome the man who stole the letter. The letter is brought back and satisfies the gruntled inspectors, who lodge a complaint to Hijikata. Harada takes a half-month pay cut as punishment, but keeps quiet about the incident. Shinpachi takes Harada out for drinks.
4	"A Drifting Boat"; Transliteration: "Toudou Heisuke-Tayutau Fune" (Japanese: 第四章 揺蕩う舟)	October 28, 2011
Heisuke Toudou gets into a brawl on the street while out with Chizuru. Chizuru tries to stop him, but Harada holds her back. Heisuke later catches a duck back for dinner and Chizuru makes stew with it. While snatching a piece of duck with Shinpachi, the meat flies into Hijikata's forehead. Shinpachi quickly moves to another table while Heisuke makes things worse by rattling non-stop and ultimately blaming Hijikata for it. Hijikata gives Heisuke a thrashing. Flashback to the geisha episode, where Heisuke barges into Chizuru's room in the geisha house and is overcome by her beauty. He dashes off to demand Kondo and Hijikata take Chizuru off this dangerous mission. In his absence, Chikage Kazama arrives and tries to kiss Chizuru, but is whacked by an abruptly entering Sen, allowing Chizuru to flee. Meanwhile, back at Shinsengumi headquarters, Heisuke complains loudly to Kondou and Hijikata the inappropriateness of Chizuru's mission. Kondou gives his go ahead to terminate the mission, and Heisuke runs back to Chizuru. Finding her not there, he hears the voice of Yamazaki upstairs and joins him in the fight with the drunken lechers. Next morning, Heisuke has a snowball fight with Chizuru, Shinpachi and Harada, but the latter two grab Chizuru and hide behind a tree when Hijikata appears demanding to know what happened to that the tattered screen doors, leaving Heisuke alone to be punished.
5	"The Winds of Fate"; Transliteration: "Hijikata Toshizou-Tenmei no Kaze" (Japanese: 第五章 天明の風)	November 25, 2011
Hijikata wakes up to first snow, and sees Kondou inviting his comrades to leave their first foot imprint in the snow. He composes a haiku and is overheard by Chizuru and Souji, and Souji teases him about it while asking Chizuru to compliment on his poetry. Hijikata becomes embarrassed and covers it up with angry words. Chizuru and Soji leave for breakfast. At night, Kondou and Hijikata discuss about the defecting Edo, and Hijikata tells Kondou about his plan to ask Saito to defect. Heisuke barges into their room and Hijikata leaves to take care of things. He arrives at the geisha house to be greeted by chaos. Saito tells Hijikata to take Chizuru away, and her dressing causes a commotion when Hijikata is walking with her towards the door. A man demands money from Hijikata for taking away a geisha, and Hijikata flares up, declaring his status as Shinsengumi vice-captain and yanking Chizuru away. Upon return, Soji teases them at the door, and Hijikata hurriedly asks Chizuru to hide away. The next day, Souji catches Hijikata hiding in a back alley observing Harada on his gate duty with the Bakufu inspectors. Saito and Shinpachi are invited for a drink with Itou, and Shinpachi is highly irritated. Hijikata meets Kazama on the streets and draws his katana when Sanan and Amagiri appears and stops them. Next morning, Kondou brings dangos to Hijikata's room, and everyone suddenly appears to share them. Soji grabs Hijikata's haiku book on the table and starts reads the haiku of the snow from that one morning. He then compares it to the dango he has in his hand and Hijikata becomes embarrassed and tries to grab his book back from Souji, much to the amusement of everyone.
6	"Dance of the Snowflakes"; Transliteration: "Kazama Chikage-Sekka no Mai" (Japanese: 第六章 雪華の舞)	July 27, 2012
Flashback to earlier episodes, Chizuru goes undercover as a geisha to spy on some rogue samurai who are planning to attack the Shinsengumi. After barging into Chizuru's room, Heisuke dashes off to demand Kondo and Hijikata take Chizuru off this dangerous mission. In his absence, Kazama arrives and immediately recognized Chizuru before trying to kiss her, but is whacked by an abruptly entering Sen, allowing Chizuru to flee. While being scolded by Sen for his persistence in abducting Chizuru, Kazama reveals to Sen his intentions for pursuing Chizuru -- to sustain a pure devil bloodline. When Sen is distracted by the commotion caused by the Shinsengumi, Kazama leaves quietly and meets Chizuru again. Satisfied with seeing Chizuru as a geisha and the Shinsengumi's antics, Kazama allows Chizuru to leave. Later, a group of demons gather in the forest, including Kaoru Nagumo, who declares to show no mercy should Kazama continue to pursue Chizuru. On New Years Day, Kazama runs into Chizuru at a crowded marketplace. Rather than harassing her, he volunteers to escort her back to her home at the Shinsengumi headquarters. He does, though, vow to take her with him when they meet again.
