= Qassam =

Qassam is an acronym for the Arabic Quwat al-islamiya al-mujahida (Islamic combatant force), meaning the armed branch of an Islamic movement.

It may refer to:

- Izz ad-Din al-Qassam, an influential Islamist preacher
- Izz ad-Din al-Qassam Brigades, the military wing of Hamas
- Qassam rocket, a type of rocket used by the military wing of Hamas against Israel

== See also ==
- Qasam (disambiguation)
