= Amir Kassam =

Amir Kassam, FRSB, OBE, is visiting professor in the School of Agriculture, Policy and Development at the University of Reading, and a member of the global forum of the Food and Agriculture Organization of the United Nations. He was made OBE in the Queen's Birthday Honours List 2005 for services to tropical agriculture and rural development. He is a fellow of the Royal Society of Biology.

== Early life ==
Amir Kassam was born in Zanzibar, Tanzania. He received his BSc in agriculture and PhD in agricultural botany from the University of Reading, and his MSc in irrigation from the University of California at Davis.

== Career ==
Kassam is visiting professor in the School of Agriculture, Policy and Development at the University of Reading. He is also a member of the global forum of the Food and Agriculture Organization of the United Nations and a fellow of the Royal Society of Biology. He is an advocate of no-till agriculture.

He has been a research fellow at the Institute for Agricultural Research, Ahmadu Bello University, Zaria, Northern Nigeria; a scientist at ICRISAT, India; deputy director general at WARDA (the Africa Rice Centre), Cote d’Ivoire; interim executive secretary of the CGIAR Science Council, FAO, Rome; chairman of the Aga Khan Foundation (UK); chairman of the FOCUS Humanitarian Assistance Europe Foundation, and chairman of the Tropical Agriculture Association, UK.

Kassam was made a member of the Order of the British Empire (OBE) in the Queen's Birthday Honours List 2005 for services to tropical agriculture and rural development.

== Publications ==
- Kassam, A. (ed.), Advances in Conservation Agriculture Volume 1: Systems and Science, Burleigh Dodds Science Publishing, Cambridge, UK. ISBN 978-1-78676-264-1
- Kassam, A. (ed.), Advances in Conservation Agriculture Volume 2: Practice and Benefits, Burleigh Dodds Science Publishing, Cambridge, UK. ISBN 978-1-78676-268-9
- Kassam, A. (ed.), Advances in Conservation Agriculture Volume 3: Adoption and Spread, Burleigh Dodds Science Publishing, Cambridge, UK. ISBN 978-1-78676-475-1
