= List of Hakuoki: Demon of the Fleeting Blossom episodes =

Hakuoki: Demon of the Fleeting Blossom
- No. of episodes: 12

Release
- Original network: TV Kanagawa, Chiba TV, TV Saitama, KBS Kyoto, Sun TV, AT-X, Tokyo MX TV, TV Aichi
- Original release: April 4 – June 20, 2010

Season chronology
- Next → Hakuoki: Record of the Jade Blood

The plot of the first season of the anime series Hakuoki takes place during the Bakumatsu period in Japan from 1853 to 1867. Chizuru Yukimura, a 16-year-old girl, is searching for her missing father in Kyoto. Her search leads her to encounter bloodthirsty swordsmen that are slayed by a fictional iteration of the Shinsengumi. Chizuru learns that the Shinsengumi is also looking for her father, Kodo Yukimura, so they allow her to stay with them in exchange for her help in looking for Kodo. During her stay with the Shinsengumi, Chizuru is dragged into a war against anti-foreign factions and then learns about the existence of Water of Life, a drug developed by her father that increases one's strength but drives them into a vampiric state where they are thirsty for blood called Rasetsu. Kodo used the Shinsengumi members as test subjects to complete the elixir. The creation of Rasetsu also earns attention of a group of Oni (Demon) working for the opposing faction who seeks to destroy all Rasetsu, including the Shinsengumi.

The anime is produced by Studio Deen. It is also jointly produced by Asuka Yamazaki, Kazuhiko Hasegawa, and Mitsutoshi Ogura, with music composed by Kow Otani, and the story written by Megumu Sasano, Mitsutaka Hirota, Yoshiko Nakamura, and Osamu Yamasaki.

The opening theme is "Izayoi Namida" by Aika Yoshioka and the ending theme is "Kimi no Kioku" by Mao.

== Episode list ==
No. overall	No. in season	Title	Original release date
1	1	"Snowflake Capital"; Transliteration: "Sekka no Miyako" (Japanese: 雪華の都)	April 4, 2010
Chizuru Yukimura is a young woman who travels to Kyoto disguised as a boy to search for her missing father. One night, she is chased by ronin and manages to hide. Just as she is about to be found, the ronin are attacked by Rasetsu, or furies. As the furies close in on Chizuru, Hajime Saito and Shinsengumi members appear and dispatch the furies. At the Shinsengumi headquarters, Chizuru explains who she is and why she is in Kyoto. The Shinsengumi allow her to live at their headquarters as they are also searching for her father.
2	2	"Seeds of Discord"; Transliteration: "Dōran no Hibuta" (Japanese: 動乱の火蓋)	April 11, 2010
Chizuru starts to work her way into the Shinsengumi's society, motivated by the desire to be useful and her concern over the injured member Sannan. She gains permission to leave headquarters in the company of regular patrols, in order to continue the search for her father. Following a lead, she runs headlong into the Shinsengumi's enemies, and in the subsequent fight, the Shinsengumi learn of a Choushuu plot against Kyoto and the Emperor. They split their forces between the suspected Shikokuya and Ikedaya houses. The Choushuu conspirators are detected at Ikedaya, and Chizuru is sent with Yamazaki to request reinforcements from others surveilling at Shikokuya, but they are intercepted.
3	3	"Twilight Blossom"; Transliteration: "Yoiyami ni Saku Hana" (Japanese: 宵闇に咲く華)	April 18, 2010
Chizuru is forced to run the message herself as Yamazaki fights off the attackers. Back at Ikedaya, Okita and Heisuke fight their way through the conspiritors, but encounter two mysterious and very powerful strangers on the upper floor. Meanwhile, Toshi Hijikata and the other Shinsengumi arrive in time to greet the Aizu clan who have been tardy in arriving. Hijikata warn the Aizu clan not to interfere, suspecting them of aiming to claim credit for the suppression of the Choushuu. Hijikata has Sanosuke and Shinpachi take Chizuru to the Gion festival to see the bright lanterns of the Yamaboko Junkō (山鉾巡行). The Ikedaya Incident leads to a request for the Shinsengumi to fight on the front lines.
4	4	"Those Who Come From the Darkness"; Transliteration: "Yami Yori Kuru Mono" (Japanese: 闇より来る者)	April 25, 2010
A mysterious princess is seen, speaking of a "storm" arising. Meanwhile, the Shinsengumi arrive at the office of the Fushimi Magistrate as requested, but are rudely turned away and conclude that they have been assigned to be reservists. Hearing explosions, the Shinsengumi head into in the city of their own accord. They arrive to find conflict between the Aizu and Satsuma clan forces, and Saito finds one of the mystery men from Ikedaya (Amagiri Kyuuju) supporting Satsuma Clan soldiers. Harada encounters a third powerful stranger (Shiranui Kyou) wielding a Western-style handgun and as Hijikata and Chizuru race to Mt. Tennozan in pursuit of Choushuu forces, they are confronted by the blonde stranger, Chikage Kazama. Chizuru is wounded, but the cut heals immediately. Meanwhile, the city is ablaze in what has become known as the Kinmon Incident.
5	5	"Conflicting Swords"; Transliteration: "Sōkoku Seshi Yaiba" (Japanese: 相克せし刃)	May 2, 2010
After several months, Chizuru's service to the Shinsegumi has become a regular part of their everyday lives. Itou Kashitarou allies with the corps as an advisor, but not all the soldiers are happy with his presence. The Shinsengumi make plans to move to a larger headquarters, the Nishi-Honganji Temple and a former Choushuu safehouse. Meanwhile, Sannan, not content with his inability to contribute, continues research on a potion that Chizuru's father had been working on to increase strength and regenerative abilities, but with dangerously detrimental side effects.
6	6	"The Demon's Lifeline"; Transliteration: "Oni no Meimyaku" (Japanese: 鬼の命脈)	May 9, 2010
Sannan takes the potion he created, but begins to loses self control. The Shinsegumi wait to see if he recovers and work to keep Itou from noticing. Saito informs Chizuru that her father had been working on the potion and using the Shisengumi as test subjects. While on patrol, she and the soldiers rescue a young woman, Nagumo Kaoru, who looks exactly like Chizuru, who is still dressing as a boy. The Shinsengumi are assigned guard duty for the Shōgun's visit and Chizuru is taken along. One night, Chikage Kazama and his companions attempt to kidnap Chizuru, alleging that she is an Oni like themselves.
7	7	"Fate of a Fetter"; Transliteration: "Shikkoku no Unmei" (Japanese: 桎梏の運命)	May 16, 2010
The three Oni attempt to kidnap Chizuru, but are foiled by Saito and Harada so they withdraw. Chizuru befriends a young girl called Sen, whom she rescues from thugs with the aid of Saito and Harada. The Shinsengumi members undergo medical exams by doctor Matsumoto, and Chizuru recognizes the doctor as a friend of her father. His prescription for the Shinsengumi is to set up a proper infirmary and clean the HQ. Chizuru learns from Matsumoto that Okita has tuberculosis and he admits that her father had been working on the ochimizu for the shogun in an effort to create Rasetsu, demon warriors. Sannan confirms that he has been continuing his own research into ochimizu. Kazama infiltrates the headquarters to confront Chizuru again and reveals that her father is working with his Joui group.
8	8	"Fleeting Dreams"; Transliteration: "Asaki Yumemishi" (Japanese: あさきゆめみし)	May 23, 2010
Chizuru has been depressed thinking what Kazama said about her father, so her friends set up an afternoon with the charming O'Sen which cheers her up. Hijikata and Shinpachi have a confrontation over Hijikata's high expectations of the veterans compared to the new recruits. The Shinsengumi receive news from the Bakufu, that the shogun has died and that the shogunate has suffered a defeat. During an guarding assignment, the Sano and the Shinsengumi are set upon by Choushuu supporters who are aided by a woman who looks like Chizuru, but they drive them off. With Sano's reward money for the successful assignment, they have Chizuru dressed up like a girl during a rowdy celebratory night out. Princess O'Sen receives a report that Kazama and his group have returned to the capital.
9	9	"The Trails of Carnage"; Transliteration: "Shura no Wadachi" (Japanese: 修羅の轍)	May 30, 2010
Itou seeks to subvert and split the Shinsengumi. Chizuru still hides her ability to heal a wound quickly after she is injured by an ochimizu-maddened soldier. Itou is horrified when he finds out Sannan is still alive. He is ordered to guard the tomb of Emperor Koumei and Saito and Heisuke accompany him. Princess O'Sen and Kimigiku, her kunoichi, visit the Shinsengumi to collect Chizuru for her own safety. She claims that she and Chizuru are descended from ancient oni bloodlines, however Chizuru decides to stay. Sannan's Rasetsu Squad are activated when Kazama and the other two oni again attempt to kidnap Chizuru from the headquarters. Hijikata bravely fights Kazama but he is disarmed, however Chizuru firmly refuses to accompany Kazama, forcing him to leave.
10	10	"Where the Bonds Lead"; Transliteration: "Kizuna no Yukue" (Japanese: 絆のゆくえ)	June 6, 2010
The Shinsengumi move their headquarters to Fudoudou village following the oni attack. Saito reports on Itou's attempts to discredit the Shinsengumi and his plot to assassinate Commander Kondou. The Shinsengumi is dispatched and Itou is assassinated. Afterwards, Saito and Chizuru confront Heisuke directly, and they persuade him to fight alongside them against Itou's men. Meanwhile, Souji, severely weakened by his tuberculosis, is approached by Kaoru, who reveals his identity as Chizuru's twin and offers Souji a vial of the "medicine" that would heal him but make him a Rasetsu. Back at Itou's compound, the Shinsengumi forces are surrounded by Itou's men, including Shiranui and Amagiri. Heisuke joins Sano and Shinpachi, and engages Amagiri in battle to protect Chizuru but he is brutally beaten.
11	11	"Fallen Ones"; Transliteration: "Koboreochiru Mono" (Japanese: 零れ落ちるもの)	June 13, 2010
After his defeat, Heisuke drinks ochimizu and becomes a Rasetsu. Commander Kondou is ambushed in an attempted assassination which leaves him in a critical condition. In order to avenge his leader, Souji drinks Kaoru's ochimizu, making him a Rasetsu and he tracks down the ambushers. During the fight, Kaoru appears, and explains that the ochimizu will not heal tuberculosis and also reveals the reason he hates Chizuru. Souji kills most of Kondou's attackers, but is shot by silver bullets. With both Souji and Kondou close to death, Hijikata sends them to Osaka Castle to be treated by Doctor Matsumoto.
12	12	"On Opposite Sides of Arms"; Transliteration: "Kengeki no Kanata" (Japanese: 剣戟の彼方)	June 20, 2010
The conflict between the Shinsengumi and imperialist forces breaks out into the Boshin War. During the Battle of Toba–Fushimi, Inoue is brutally killed in front of Chizuru as they vainly seek reinforcements. Kazama appears and kills Inoue's murderers just as Chizuru prepares to fight them. Hijikata arrives and engages Kazama in battle, believing that he killed Inoue. During the fight, Hijikata drinks ochimizu and becomes a Rasetsu to better his odds of victory. Suddenly, Yamazaki steps in to prevent Hijikata throwing his life away, but he is grievously wounded instead. The fierce battle ends abruptly when Amagiri comes to collect Kazama and they depart. In the aftermath, the Shinsengumi bury Inoue before departing by ship for Edo, following the retreating shogunate. En route, Yamazaki succumbs to his wounds and is buried at sea.
