= List of Hakuoki: Record of the Jade Blood episodes =

Hakuoki: Record of the Jade Blood
- No. of episodes: 10

Release
- Original network: TV Kanagawa, Chiba TV, TV Saitama, KBS Kyoto, Sun TV, AT-X, Tokyo MX TV, TV Aichi
- Original release: October 10 – December 12, 2010

Series chronology
- ← Previous; Hakuoki: Demon of the Fleeting Blossom Next → Hakuoki: A Memory of Snow Flowers

The story of the second season takes place a year after the first season. The Shinsengumi moves back to Edo and prepares for the final battle against the Imperial Army. At the same time, Chizuru's father and older twin brother, Kodo and Kaoru, provides the Water of Life to the enemy faction to create armies of Rasetsu in order to restore the power of the Yukimura clan.

The anime is produced by Studio Deen. It is also jointly produced by Asuka Yamazaki, Kazuhiko Hasegawa, and Mitsutoshi Ogura, with music composed by Kow Otani, and the story written by Megumu Sasano, Mitsutaka Hirota, Yoshiko Nakamura, and Osamu Yamasaki.

== Episode list ==
| No. overall | No. in season | Title | Original release date |
|---|---|---|---|
| 0 | Special | "Memories In Kyoto"; Transliteration: "Kyōto Kaisō-roku" (Japanese: 京都回想録) | October 3, 2010 |
A recap of the first season, aired before the actual second season began.
| 13 | 1 | "Like a Flame"; Transliteration: "Homura no Gotoku" (Japanese: 焔の如く) | October 10, 2010 |
In 1868, the Shinsengumi have established their new headquarters in Edo. Hijikata has been working nonstop since their arrival as their temporary leader in Kondo's absence, causing Chizuru and the squad a great deal of concern about his health. In addition, Hijikata is also struggling to control the urge to drink blood caused by his transformation into a Rasetsu. Meanwhile, Sannan suspects that Chizuru's blood could relieve some of the side effects suffered by the Rasetsu. Kondou returns to the Shinsengumi headquarters and informs the squad that they are being renamed the Kouyou Chinbutai. They have been commissioned by the shogunate to defend Koufu Castle from the Satsuma-Chosu factions with the aid of cannons. The Shinsengumi captains are not happy with how the Tokugawa shogunate appears to be supporting the Imperial faction and Nagakura is suspicious of Kondou's daimyo aspirations.
| 14 | 2 | "The Hallway of Setbacks"; Transliteration: "Satetsu no Kairō" (Japanese: 蹉跌の回廊) | October 11, 2010 |
Okita's tuberculosis is worsening, and Hijikata refuses to let him accompany the Shinsengumi into battle. Kondou pauses in Hino while the Shinsengumi slowly proceed to Koufu, further angering Nagakura. When pressed, Hijikata tells Saito that in their current state, they cannot match the enemy. Chizuru wakes from a nightmare in which she sees Hijikata killed. She follows Saito to the edge of the camp where he explains to her why he fights with the Shinsengumi. Shimada arrives and tells them that the enemy has already entered Koufu Castle with the aid of local forces. With this news, many new recruits defect, but Kondou refuses to retreat and lose face, so Hijikata leaves to find more troops in Edo. Before he leaves, he makes a "Chiming Metal" (緊張, Kinchō) oath with Chizuru, making her promise to stay alive and protect Kondou. The Shinsengumi soon come under sustained attack, and Kondou reluctantly agrees to retreat after seeing many of his men die in vain. Harada's men volunteer to protect the rear. Nagakura and Harada run into the Oni, Shiranui, and together they battle a group of uniformed Rasetsu. Behind the Rasetsu is their creator, Chizuru's father, Koudou.
| 15 | 3 | "Distant Shadow"; Transliteration: "Tooki Omokage" (Japanese: 遠き面影) | October 18, 2010 |
Koudou explains that his new Rasetsu will fulfil has dream of reviving the Yukimura clan. Kondou and Chizuru escape into the forest, but are confronted by Kaoru, who reveals that he is Chizuru's older brother and that Koudou is not their real father. He asks her to join him, but she refuses and draws her sword. She is almost killed by Kaoru but Okita intercepts him. The weak Okita fails to defeat Kaoru, but Kazama appears and kills Kaoru. Meanwhile, Shiranui, Harada, and Nagakura fight the Rasetsu, but they are outnumbered. Shiranui uses his last bullet to blow up a cart of explosive material, allowing the Shinsengumi to escape. Later, the Shinsengumi move into residences at Hatamoto and Hijikata returns with new troops. Harada and Nagakura decide to leave the Shinsengumi to fight the Satsuma and Choshu in their own way.
| 16 | 4 | "Undying Sincerity"; Transliteration: "Seishin wa Towa ni" (Japanese: 誠心は永遠に) | October 25, 2010 |
Saito follows Sannan one night suspecting that he is seeking blood, but Saito encounters Amagiri fighting a Rasetsu and helps him. When the Rasetsu turns to dust, Amagiri reveals to Saito that a Rasetsu's lifespan is a shortened corresponding to the energy they expend. Saito relays this information to the Shinsengumi, so Hijikata orders Sannan to stop all Rasetsu experimentation and decides to move the Shinsengumi to Aizu. Chizuru witnesses Hijikata having a vampiric impulse, but he refuses to accept her blood to reduce the symptoms. The enemy attacks the headquarters while the troops are out for training. Kondou orders Hijikata and the rest to escape while he stays behind to buy time. As the group escape, they run into enemy soldiers, and despite Chizuru's plea, Hijikata uses his Rasetsu powers to kill them all. Hijikata angrily laments his choice to leave Kondou behind, but Chizuru promises to stay by his side.
| 17 | 5 | "Fleeting Dream"; Transliteration: "Tamayura no Yume" (Japanese: 玉響の夢) | November 1, 2010 |
The Shinsengumi join the old Bakufu army and return to Aizu. Hijikata desperately petitions to spare Kondou's life, but without success. Back in Edo, Harada meets Shiranui who reveals that Koudou is building his own army of Rasetsu. Ootori Keisuke, the young commander-in-chief, asks Hijikata to become the adviser for the vanguard. Hijikata has another vampiric impulse, and reluctantly drinks Chizuru's blood. The old Bakufu army attacks and takes Utsunomiya Castle. Hijikata faces Kazama once more, transforming into his Rasetsu form, but he is wounded by Kazama's demon-slaying sword. He stays behind at Nikkou to receive medical treatment. Ootori tells Hijikata despite his skill as a warrior, his performance as an adviser was a failure.
| 18 | 6 | "Shining Light of the Dawn"; Transliteration: "Kagayakeru Gyōkō" (Japanese: 輝ける暁光) | November 8, 2010 |
Chizuru accompanies the wounded Hijikata and follow the Shinsengumi towards Tsuruga Castle in Wakamatsu, Aizu. Okita is angry at Hijikata, for failing to protect Kondou who has since been beheaded, but Chizuru explains that Kondou sacrificed himself to save the Shinsengumi. Saito forces Hijikata to stay behind and recover while he takes the front line himself. The New Government Army attacks the Shougitai, including Koudou with a group of Rasetsu coming to seek blood. Harada again cooperates with Shiranui who is armed with silver bullets to kill them. Harada is mortally wounded and Koudou prepares to kill Shiranui with a bomb, but Harada spears Koudou causing the bomb to explode at his feet. Harada and Shiranui are never seen again by the Shinsengumi. Okita overhears a group of men planning to assassinate Hijikata, and uses his Rasetsu powers to intercept and kill them all. Meanwhile, Hijikata hears of a white-haired man fighting dozens of men, and he runs to the place where Okita is fighting, followed by Chizuru. They reach the scene but all that is left is Okita's sword, Okita having used up his lifespan and disintegrated.
| 19 | 7 | "Blade of the Sun"; Transliteration: "Tendō no Yaiba" (Japanese: 天道の刃) | November 15, 2010 |
At Tsuruga Castle, Lord Katamori Matsudaira of Aizu assigns Saito to lead the Shinsengumi against the Satsuma-Choshu forces, and entrusts Hyoe Masaki, a young Aizu Clan soldier with his men to his command. Masaki initially refuses to obey Saito's orders, believing that he is not a warrior since he wears his swords and clothes differently. The Shinsengumi and Masaki's army attack at Shirakawa-guchi, but become outnumbered. Saito orders a retreat and later, Masaki acknowledges Saito's status as a warrior following his display of swordsmanship and fighting skills. Meanwhile, Hijikata recovers enough to rejoin the Shinsengumi. The Aizu alliance decides to intercept the enemy at Bonari Pass, but again they are completely outnumbered. Masaki sacrifices himself so Saito and the Shinsengumi can retreat. Lord Katamori orders them to withdraw north to Sendai to seek reinforcements while he stays behind. Saito decides to stay with the Aizu Clan and fly the Shinsengumi's banner. The episode ends with a scene of Saito charging the enemy.
| 20 | 8 | "Scattering Cherry Blossoms"; Transliteration: "Chizuru ōka" (Japanese: 散ずる桜花) | November 22, 2010 |
Hijikata meets Takeaki Enomoto, an admiral in Sendai, who mentions that murders have been happening frequently outside the castle. Hijikata and Chizuru suspect the culprits is a Rasetsu Unit. This theory is supported when Heisuke reveals that Sannan has most likely joined Koudou who is still alive. Koudou shows up with his Rasetsu unit and kidnaps Chizuru, leaving Heisuke fighting alone in the broad daylight. Koudou takes Chizuru to Sendai castle where he attempts to persuade her to lead the Yukimura Clan with his Rasetsu, but she refuses. Sannan joins Koudou, but when Heisuke and Hijikata appear, Sannan says that he was working with Koudou to build an empire where Rasetsu and Oni could live peacefully. He later admits that he was hoping to turn the Rasetsu over to the Shinsengumi, but realizes that they have no future, so he joins Hijikata and Heisuke to help slaughter the Rasetsu. Koudou is killed protecting Chizuru, and Heisuke and Sannan eventually crumble to dust after using up their lifespan. The remaining former Bakufu army and Shinsengumi make plans to move to Ezo, and Hijikata orders that Chizuru should stay behind in Sendai.
| 21 | 9 | "The Blooming Hepatica"; Transliteration: "Yukiwarisō no Hanasakite" (Japanese: 雪割草の花咲きて) | November 29, 2010 |
Hijikata and his army manage to capture the city of Matsumae and drive out the Matsumae daimyo. However, they lose two of their ships, the Kaiyo and Shinsokumaru, when they run aground in bad weather. During a meeting, Hijikata experiences bloodthirst, but a vision of Chizuru calms him. Back in Sendai, Chizuru visits Koudou's grave on a daily basis, but one day she encounters Kazama Chikage who admits that he will honor his promise to fight Hijikata once more. The Republic of Ezo is proclaimed in Hakodate, and Hijikata is elected as the Vice Commissioner, giving him even more responsibility. Ootori secretly sends for Chizuru to work as Hijikata's attendant. When she arrives Hijikata is initially angry, but then admits that he wondered how he survived without her. When enemy navy approaches Hokkaido by sea, the Republic of Ezo attempts a daring attack in Miyako Bay, but they are forced to retreat. Hijikata tries again to make Chizuru leave but she refuses, and she promises to stay with him to the end.
| 22 | 10 | "The Pale, Dreamlike Sakura"; Transliteration: "Mugen no usuzakura" (Japanese: 夢幻の薄桜) | December 6, 2010 |
As winter ends, the Imperial forces launch an offensive on Ezo. Hijikata's army has victories in Futamata-guchi, but Ootori's army falls in Matsumae-guchi forcing Hijikata and his army to retreat to Goryoukaku before they are isolated. When another bloodthirst strikes, Hijikata realizes that his body cannot hold out much longer and again drinks Chizuru's blood. In Benten Daiba, Hijikata meets Shimada and Ootori, who blames himself for the loss at Matsumae-guchi but Hijikata says the blame is not his. Once again, Hijikata tries to get Chizuru to seek safety, but after she refuses he confesses his love and kisses her. The New Government Army attacks Benten Daiba and Hijikata is shot while riding there to provide support. Chizuru saves him by giving him some of her blood under a beautiful cherry blossom tree. Kazama Chikage appears and Hijikata engages him in a fierce fight during which Kazama declares Hijikata is not a Rasetsu, but an Oni and names him "Hakuoki". Finally, Hijikata kills Kazama but then falls to his knees and collapses. As he lays with his head in Chizuru's arms, she recalls her time with the Shinsengumi and sees them and their banner standing proudly in the sky. Hijikata's death is implied but the ending is ambiguous.
