= Qasam, Yemen =

Qasam
- Interactive map of Qasam
- Coordinates: 16°08′N 49°09′E
- Country: Yemen
- Governorate: Hadhramaut
- Elevation: 1,814 ft (553 m)
- Time zone: UTC+3 (Yemen Standard Time)

Qasam is a village in eastern Yemen. It is located in the Hadhramaut Governorate. Qasam was the capital of the Tamimi tribe, aligned with the Qu'aiti state. The Tamimi country was interspersed between the Kathiri cities of Tarim and Seiyun.
