= Kasim =

Kasim as a given name, a variant of Qasim. It may refer to:

== People known only by the given name Kasim ==
- Kasım Pasha, Ottoman general and governor
- Kasım of Karaman, the last bey of the Karaman Beylik, a Turkish principality in Anatolia
- Şehzade Kasım, Ottoman prince (Şehzade)

== People with the given name Kasim ==
- Kasim Edebali (born 1989), American football player
- Kasim Nuhu (born 1995), Ghanaian footballer
- Kasim Reed, American lawyer and politician
- Kasim Sulton, American musician
