= Tomohiro Tsuboi =

Japanese voice actor (born 1971)

Tomohiro Tsuboi (坪井 智浩, Tsuboi Tomohiro; born September 30, 1971 in Saitama Prefecture) is a male Japanese voice actor. He is part of 81 Produce, previously Mausu Promotion.

== Voice roles ==
=== TV animation ===
- Boruto: Naruto Next Generations (Tenma Funato)
- Buso Renkin (Shinyo Suzuki)
- D.Grayman (Johnny Gill)
- Fortune Arterial (Seichiro Togi)
- Gakuen Heaven (Omi Shichijo)
- Hakuouki: Shinsengumi Kitan (Nagakura Shinpachi)
- Katanagatari (Maniwa Kuizame)
- Kochoki: Wakaki Nobunaga (Nobuhiro Oda)
- Naruto (Izumo Kamizuki)
- Naruto Shippuden (Izumo Kamizuki, Amai)
- Onmyou Taisenki (Teru Sarigoru)
- Rin-ne (Suzuki)
- Starship Operators (Shinto Mikami)
- Tears to Tiara (Taliesin)
- Tokyo Majin (Morihito Inugami)
- Trouble Chocolate (Ghana)
- X-Men: Evolution
- Zegapain (Shima)

=== OVA ===
- Saint Seiya: The Lost Canvas (Hypnos)

=== Drama CD ===
- Gaki no Ryoubun series 4: Uwasa no Shinzui (Ryousuke Asao)
- Gaki no Ryoubun series 5: Akuun no Jouken (Ryousuke Asao)
- Recipe (Tatsumi Kaiya)
- Yume no You na Hanashi (Kan)

=== Video games ===
- Full House Kiss (Kou Matsukawa)
- Hakuoki Shinsengumi Kitan (Nagakura Shinpachi)
- Hakuoki Zuisouroku (Nagakura Shinpachi)
- Hakuoki Shinsengumi Kitan (PSP) (Nagakura Shinpachi)
- Hakuoki Shinsengumi Kitan (PS3) (Nagakura Shinpachi)
- Hakuoki Yugiroku (Nagakura Shinpachi)
- Princess Maker
- Sengoku Basara 2 (Maeda Toshiie)
- Tears to Tiara: Kakan no Daichi - Taliesin
- Tenchu 2 (Rikimaru)
- Tokyo Majin Gakuen Kenpuchō: Tō
- Solatorobo: Red the Hunter (Baion)
- Way of the Warrior (Ninja) (Japanese dub)

=== Tokusatsu ===
- Ninpuu Sentai Hurricaneger (2002): (Poison Flower Ninja Hanasakkadoushi (ep. 5))
- K-tai Investigator 7 (2008): (Phone Braver 01 (eps. 2 - 45))
- Kamen Rider Decade (2009): (Swallowtail Fangire (ep. 4))
- Kamen Rider OOO (2011): (Oumu Yummy (Blue, Red) (ep. 25 - 26 (Blue), 27 (Red)))
- Tokumei Sentai Go-Busters (2012): (Sunadokeiloid (ep. 33))

=== Dubbing ===
==== Live-action ====
- 24 (Lesa Murali)
- Bottoms Up (Hayden Field (Brian Hallisay))
- ER (Morales)
- House of Wax (Nick (Chad Michael Murray))
- King Kong (Preston (Colin Hanks))
- The Hunting Party (Benjamin Strauss (Jesse Eisenberg))
- NCIS: Los Angeles (Marty Deeks (Eric Christian Olsen))
- Velvet Goldmine (Arthur Stuart (Christian Bale))

==== Animated ====
- Thomas the Tank Engine & Friends (Toby (succeeding Yasuhiko Kawazu), Sidney (replacing Ken Sanders), Mike, Flynn and Merrick)
