= Baragaki: Unbroken Samurai =

- Film poster

Japanese name
- Kanji: 燃えよ剣
- Directed by: Masato Harada
- Screenplay by: Masato Harada
- Based on: Moeyo Ken by Ryōtarō Shiba
- Starring: Junichi Okada; Ko Shibasaki; Ryohei Suzuki; Ryosuke Yamada; Hideaki Itō
- Cinematography: Takahide Shibanushi
- Edited by: Eugene Harada
- Music by: Reiko Tsuchiya
- Distributed by: Toho, Asmik Ace
- Release date: October 15, 2021 (Japan)
- Running time: 148 minutes
- Country: Japan
- Language: Japanese

Baragaki: Unbroken Samurai (Japanese: 燃えよ剣, Hepburn: Moeyo Ken) is a 2021 Japanese historical film directed by Masato Harada. The film was initially scheduled for release in May 2020, but was postponed to October 2021, due to the COVID-19 pandemic.

== Plot ==
Hijikata Toshizō fulfilled his dream of becoming a samurai. As the vice-commander of the Shinsengumi, he works to maintain security in Kyoto. However, finally Japan entered into a Civil War.

== Cast ==
Main

- Junichi Okada as Hijikata Toshizō
- Ko Shibasaki as Oyuki
- Ryohei Suzuki as Kondō Isami
- Ryosuke Yamada as Okita Sōji
- Hideaki Itō as Serizawa Kamo

Others

- Onoe Ukon II as Matsudaira Katamori
- Yūki Yamada as Tokugawa Yoshinobu
- Taka Takao as Inoue Genzaburō
- Bandō Minosuke II as Emperor Kōmei
- Junpei Yasui as Yamanami Keisuke
- Ayumi Tanida as Nagakura Shinpachi
- Satoshi Kaneda as Tōdō Heisuke
- Kouhei Matsushita as Saitō Hajime
- Daisuke Muramoto as Yamazaki Susumu
- Kengo Yoshida as Harada Sanosuke
- Nijirō Murakami as Okada Izō
- Junko Abe as Itosato
- Jonas Bloquet as Jules Brunet
- Yasumasa Ōba as Shichiri Kennosuke (fictional character)
- Maki Sakai as Satō Nobu
- Kazuhiro Yamaji as Satō Hikogorō
- Yoshi Sakō as Toshima Kihei
- Yōhei Matsukado as Niimi Nishiki
- Yoshihisa Ishida as Kusaka Genzui
- Yasushi Fuchikami as Katsura Kogorō
- Kiyohiko Shibukawa as Nakajima Nobori
- Magy as Ōsawa Ippei
- Masaki Miura as Miyabe Teizō
- Mitsuo Yoshihara as Itō Kashitarō
- Shintaro Morimoto as Ichimura Tetsunosuke
- Masahiro Takashima as Kiyokawa Hachirō
- Akira Emoto as Marujū Tenshu (fictional character)
- Masachika Ichimura as Honda Kakuan
