= The Blue Wolves of Mibu =

Japanese manga series

- First tankōbon volume cover

青のミブロ (Ao no Miburo)
- Genre: Adventure; Chanbara; Historical
- Manga
- Written by: Tsuyoshi Yasuda
- Published by: Kodansha
- English publisher: NA: Kodansha USA
- Imprint: Shōnen Magazine Comics
- Magazine: Weekly Shōnen Magazine
- Original run: October 13, 2021 – present
- Volumes: 27
- Series titles
- 1. The Blue Wolves of Mibu (2021–2024, 14 volumes); 2. The Blue Wolves of Mibu: Shinsengumi Arc (2024–present, 13 volumes)
- Anime television series

Blue Miburo
- Directed by: Kumiko Habara
- Written by: Kenta Ihara
- Music by: Yuki Hayashi
- Studio: Maho Film
- Licensed by: Crunchyroll; OceanVeil
- Original network: NNS (ytv, Nippon TV)
- Original run: October 19, 2024 – March 28, 2026
- Episodes: 38
- icon

The Blue Wolves of Mibu (Japanese: 青のミブロ, Hepburn: Ao no Miburo) is a Japanese manga series written and illustrated by Tsuyoshi Yasuda. It has been serialized in Kodansha's shōnen manga magazine Weekly Shōnen Magazine since October 2021; its first part finished in April 2024 and the second part, Shinsengumi Arc, started in the same month.

An anime television series adaptation produced by Maho Film, marketed in English under the title Blue Miburo, aired from October 2024 to March 2025. A second season aired from December 2025 to March 2026.

== Plot ==
The story starts in 1863, in Kyoto. Chirinu Nio is a docile and kind boy, devoted to his family, but deep down inside he burns with a fervent desire for justice. His turbulent "blue spring" (a Japanese idiom referring to one's adolescence) begins when he meets Hijikata Toshizō and Okita Sōji of the Miburo, a group of hated rōnin. Moved by his pure and sincere wish to change the world, Nio joins the Miburo—an abbreviation of Mibu Rōshigumi (壬生浪士組)—one of the most dangerous groups of swordsmen, which eventually would become the Shinsengumi.

== Characters ==
Chirinu Nio (ちりぬ にお)
Voiced by: Shūichirō Umeda
He meets Hijikata and Okita and decides to enter Miburo. He has a strong sense of justice and is kind and honest.
Hijikata Toshizō (土方 歳三)
Voiced by: Yōhei Azakami
A member of the Miburo and the person who invited Nio to join them. Rigorous expression, quite handsome appearance. Skilled in swordsmanship and scheming, he is a skilled swordsman and strategist.
Okita Sōji (沖田 総司)
Voiced by: Kensho Ono
A member of the Miburo and is a skilled in swordsmanship. Extremely delicate and handsome in appearance. A friendly and gentle warrior who always smiles and only wants to fight against the strong.
Saitō Hajime (斎藤 はじめ)
Voiced by: Chiaki Kobayashi
A member of the Miburo and is one of the three wolves. He is at the same skill level of swordsmanship as Okita and is left-handed. His real name is Jiro (次郎), and he was entrusted to Kondō Isami by the "first generation" Saitō Hajime who brought him up, and began to call himself "second generation Saitō Hajime".
Tanaka Tarō (田中 太郎)
Voiced by: Shun Horie
He is the same age as Nio, and was found and brought in by Serizawa.
Serizawa Kamo (芹沢 鴨)
Voiced by: Ryōta Takeuchi
A member of the Miburo. He has been slaying and purging his fellow Roshigumi members.
Kondō Isami (近藤 勇)
Voiced by: Tomokazu Sugita
A member of the Miburo. He has an innocent and upright character, but his swordsmanship is one of the best in the Mibu Rōshigumi.
Nagakura Shinpachi (永倉 新八)
Voiced by: Kenjiro Tsuda
A member of the Miburo. The narrator of the story, he is serious and polite.
Harada Sanosuke (原田 左之助)
Voiced by: Ryota Iwasaki
A member of the Miburo. A passionate man who is better at using spears than Japanese swords.
Yamanami Keisuke (山南 敬助)
Voiced by: Kengo Kawanishi
A member of the Miburo. He has a warm personality, but when he loses his temper, he also has a terrible side.
Todo Heisuke (藤堂 平助)
Voiced by: Kikunosuke Toya
A member of the Miburo.
Inoue Genzaburo (井上 源三郎)
Voiced by: Noriaki Sugiyama
A member of the Miburo.
Niimi Nishiki (新見 錦)
Voiced by: Yūichirō Umehara
A member of the Miburo.
Noguchi Kenji (野口 健司)
Voiced by: Tomohiro Ōno
A member of the Miburo.
Hirama Jusuke (平間 重助)
Voiced by: Yū Maeda
A member of the Miburo.
Hirayama Gorō (平山 五郎)
Voiced by: Kenji Nomura
A member of the Miburo.
Granny (婆ちゃん, Bāchan)
Voiced by: Sayuri Sadaoka
The old woman who runs the Dango store "Chirinu".
Chirinu Iroha (ちりぬ いろは)
Voiced by: Yūko Natsuyoshi
Nio's young sister.
Kikuchiyo (菊千代) / Tokugawa Iemochi (徳川 家茂)
Voiced by: Megumi Ogata
A kind person who thinks of others regardless of their status.
Seto (世都)
Voiced by: Ayumu Murase
The son of the large satin shop "Nijo-dori no Tsuruya". His mother is British, so he has blonde hair and blue eyes.
Matsudaira Katamori (松平容保)
Voiced by: Makoto Ishii
Lead the samurai to Kyoto to maintain public order in Kyoto.
Fujita (藤田)
Voiced by: Kenji Hamada
A samurai from the Aizu Domain.
Kimura Jutarō (木村寿太郎)
Voiced by: Mitsuru Miyamoto
A patriotic activist from Choshu who attempted to overthrow the shogunate. In a duel with Okita Sōji, he was killed by the opponent's lightning-fast swordsmanship.
Kyōshirō (京四郎)
Voiced by: Tōru Sakurai
A patriotic Satsuma warrior who attempted to overthrow the shogunate.
Naozumi Kyohachi (京八直純)
Voiced by: Tetsu Inada
The eldest son of the long-standing Kyohachi swordsmanship dojo in Kyoto.
Ayame (彩芽)
Voiced by: Yūto Uemura
He like to wear rose colored kimono and sometimes show a cold side.
Kyōhachi Yōtarō (京八 陽太郎)
Voiced by: Mamoru Miyano
Naozumi's younger brother, the head of the Kyōhachi-ryū dojo "Kyōhachikan".
Kyōhachi Nagi (京八 ナギ)
Voiced by: Chika Anzai
Naozumi's sister-in-law, Yotaro's wife. She became pregnant with Yotaro's child and gave birth, but died for the sake of the child's birth.
Sakura (さくら)
Voiced by: Rie Takahashi
A woman who is an apprentice blacksmith (bladesmith). She learned the technique of forging high-quality katana.
Hebi (蛇)
Voiced by: Kujira
A tall and mysterious person who knows the secret of Saitō Hajime.
Kagemaru (影丸)
Voiced by: Takuto Yoshinaga
He served as Kikuchiyo (Tokugawa Iemochi)'s stand-in.
Yaksha (夜叉, Yasha)
Voiced by: Ryōhei Kimura
Sendō (扇動)
Voiced by: Yoshiki Nakajima
Ryōken (猟犬)
Voiced by: Yoku Shioya
Hanabishi (花火師)
Voiced by: Masashi Yamane
Anegakōji Kintomo (姉小路公知)
Voiced by: Daisuke Hirakawa
Saitō Hajime (斎藤 一)
Voiced by: Masahiko Tanaka
A person known in history as "Saitō Hajime of the Shinsengumi".
Yamazaki Susumu (山崎丞)
Voiced by: Taku Yashiro
Hayashi Shintarō (林信太郎)
Voiced by: Kazuki Ura
Asano Totarō (浅野藤太郎)
Voiced by: Rikuya Yasuda
Ozeki Yashirō (尾関弥四郎)
Voiced by: Kōsuke Takaguchi
Ozeki Masajirō (尾関雅次郎)
Voiced by: Ryō Sugisaki
Katsura Kogorō (桂小五郎)
Voiced by: Mitsuki Saiga
Sakamoto Ryōma (坂本龍馬)
Voiced by: Junya Enoki

== Media ==
=== Manga ===
Written and illustrated by Tsuyoshi Yasuda, The Blue Wolves of Mibu started in Kodansha's shōnen manga magazine Weekly Shōnen Magazine on October 13, 2021. The series ended its first part on April 17, 2024, and resumed the following week with its second part, Shinsengumi Arc (新選組編, Shinsengumi-hen), on April 24. Kodansha has collected its chapters into individual tankōbon volumes; the first part was collected in fourteen volumes, released from February 17, 2022, to July 17, 2024. The first volume of the second part was released on September 17, 2024. As of November 17, 2026, thirteen volumes have been released.

At Anime Expo 2023, Kodansha USA announced that it had licensed the series for English publication. The first volume was released on February 27, 2024.

==== Volumes ====
No.	Original release date	Original ISBN	English release date	English ISBN
Part 1
1	February 17, 2022	978-4-06-526646-5	February 27, 2024	979-8-88-877083-2
01. "The Miburo and the Boy"; 02. "Wavering Shades of Gray"; 03. "A World That Accepts Tears"; 04. "Friends"; 05. "Whereabouts of the Soul"
2	April 15, 2022	978-4-06-527527-6	May 28, 2024	979-8-88-877084-9
06. "Face-Off"; 07. "The Devil's Proof"; 08. "Out of Place"; 09. "Iai"; 10. "The Name of Our Enemy"; 11. "For Certain"; 12. "Our Hearts as One"; 13. "Honesty"; 14. "Outsider"
3	June 17, 2022	978-4-06-528177-2	August 27, 2024	979-8-88-877085-6
15. "Each One's Creed"; 16. "Youthful Fury"; 17. "Small World"; 18. "The Weight of a Katana"; 19. "Strange Things"; 20. "Promise"; 21. "Evil and Pride"; 22. "Palms"; 23. "A Smile"
4	August 17, 2022	978-4-06-528655-5	February 25, 2025	979-8-88-877086-3
24. "Mother"; 25. "Hometown"; 26. "Types of Strength"; 27. "Treasure"; 28. "Who"; 29. "Different Roles"; 30. "The Weakest Shogun"; 31. "The Warrior's World"; 32. "Will of Steel"
5	October 17, 2022	978-4-06-529485-7	April 22, 2025	979-8-88-877087-0
33. "True Strength"; 34. "A Silent Man"; 35. "Returning the Favor"; 36. "Heroic Work"; 37. "Eight Heads"; 38. "River"; 39. "Envisioning the Same Dream"; 40. "Sign"; 41. "The Second"
6	December 16, 2022	978-4-06-529940-1	July 15, 2025	979-8-88-877088-7
42. "Fundraising"; 43. "The Real Thing"; 44. "Like the River's Flow"; 45. "Drop in the Bucket"; 46. "The Tolling of the Bell"; 47. "Seeker"; 48. "Branching Paths"; 49. "Taking Places"; 50. "Contradictions Welcome"
7	February 17, 2023	978-4-06-530525-6	October 21, 2025	979-8-88-877089-4
51. "Hunting Dog"; 52. "Place"; 53. "Nagakura's Blade"; 54. "The Value of a Name"; 55. "Man of Soil"; 56. "Wrong"; 57. "Drawn to Strength"; 58. "Heir"; 59. "Present Location"
8	April 17, 2023	978-4-06-531237-7	January 20, 2026	979-8-88-877149-5
60. "With Eyes Wide Open"; 61. "One Tatami Mat"; 62. "Chaos in the Flames"; 63. "A Tearful Attack"; 64. "Sin and Fortune"; 65. "The Way of the Sword"; 66. "Those Who Resist"; 67. "A Pitiable Winner"; 68. "Connection"
9	June 15, 2023	978-4-06-531891-1	April 21, 2026	979-8-88-877237-9
69. "Reality"; 70. "Us"; 71. "The Beautiful Way"; 72. "Blue Oath"; 73. "Boundary"; 74. "Reticent Family"; 75. "An Unwanted Present"; 76. "Wild Brawl"; 77. "Dignity"
10	September 14, 2023	978-4-06-532889-7	—	—
11	November 16, 2023	978-4-06-533546-8	—	—
12	February 16, 2024	978-4-06-534557-3	—	—
13	April 17, 2024	978-4-06-535178-9	—	—
14	July 17, 2024	978-4-06-536160-3	—	—
Part 2: Shinsengumi Arc
1 (15)	September 17, 2024	978-4-06-536761-2	—	—
2 (16)	November 15, 2024	978-4-06-537425-2	—	—
3 (17)	January 17, 2025	978-4-06-538074-1	—	—
4 (18)	March 17, 2025	978-4-06-538711-5	—	—
5 (19)	May 16, 2025	978-4-06-539356-7	—	—
6 (20)	July 16, 2025	978-4-06-540006-7	—	—
7 (21)	October 17, 2025	978-4-06-541106-3	—	—
8 (22)	December 17, 2025	978-4-06-541946-5	—	—
9 (23)	February 17, 2026	978-4-06-542628-9	—	—
10 (24)	April 16, 2026	978-4-06-543323-2	—	—
11 (25)	July 16, 2026	978-4-06-544347-7	—	—
12 (26)	September 16, 2026	978-4-06-545026-0	—	—
13 (27)	November 17, 2026	978-4-06-545725-2	—	—

=== Anime ===
In September 2023, it was announced that the manga would receive an anime television series adaptation. It is produced by Maho Film and directed by Kumiko Habara, with series composition by Kenta Ihara, character designs handled by Yūko Ōba and Miyako Nishida, and music composed by Yuki Hayashi. The series aired from October 19, 2024, to March 29, 2025, on all NNS affiliate stations, including ytv and Nippon TV, The first opening theme is "Ao" (青; 'Blue'), performed by Spyair, while the first ending theme is "Unbreakable", performed by The Jet Boy Bangerz. The second opening theme is "Ookami", performed by Umeda Cypher, while the second ending theme is "Fragment" (フラグメント, Furagumento), performed by Osage.

Following the airing of the final episode, a second season adapting the "Serizawa Assassination" arc was announced, and aired from December 20, 2025, to March 28, 2026. The opening theme song is "Blue Noise", performed by Ryosuke Yamada, while the ending theme song is "Hōmatsu" (泡沫; lit. 'Ephemeral'), performed by Soushi Sakiyama.

The series is marketed in English under the title Blue Miburo. Crunchyroll has licensed the series for streaming. The series has also been streamed by OceanVeil.

==== Episodes ====
===== Season 1 (2024–2025) =====
No. overall	No. in season	Title	Directed by (Note: Production staff information is taken from the ending credits of each episode.)	Written by	Storyboarded by	Original release date
1	1	"The Wolves of Mibu and a Boy"; Transliteration: "Mibu Nami to Shōnen" (Japanese: 壬生浪と少年)	Kumiko Habara & Tadayoshi Kusaka	Kenta Ihara	Kumiko Habara	October 19, 2024
2	2	"A World Where It's Okay to Cry"; Transliteration: "Naite Iī Sekai" (Japanese: 泣いていい世界)	Tadayoshi Kusaka	Kenta Ihara	Takeshi Mori	October 26, 2024
3	3	"Where the Soul Dwells"; Transliteration: "Tamashī no Ari Sho" (Japanese: 魂の在り処)	Kyohei Ohkasu	Kenta Ihara	Takeshi Mori	November 2, 2024
4	4	"The Name of the Enemy"; Transliteration: "Teki no Namae" (Japanese: 敵の名前)	Tomihiko Ohkubo	Takayo Igami	Tomihiko Ohkubo	November 9, 2024
5	5	"United in Purpose"; Transliteration: "Kokorozashi wa Hitotsu" (Japanese: 志は一つ)	Tadayoshi Kusaka	Haryo Shunme	Dojagagen	November 16, 2024
6	6	"To Each His Own Justice"; Transliteration: "Sorezore no Seigi" (Japanese: それぞれの正義)	Hiromichi Matano	Kenta Ihara	Takeshi Mori	November 23, 2024
7	7	"Pride"; Transliteration: "Kinji" (Japanese: 矜持)	Masayuki Iimura	Takayo Igami	Masayuki Iimura	November 30, 2024
8	8	"Palm of the Hand"; Transliteration: "Tenohira" (Japanese: 掌)	Tadayoshi Kusaka	Kunihiko Okada	Dojagagen	December 7, 2024
9	9	"Treasure"; Transliteration: "Takara" (Japanese: 宝)	Tomihiko Ohkubo	Haryo Shunme	Tomihiko Ohkubo	December 14, 2024
10	10	"The Weakest Shogun"; Transliteration: "Saijaku no Shōgun" (Japanese: 最弱の将軍)	Kyohei Oyabu	Kenta Ihara	Takeshi Mori	December 21, 2024
11	11	"True Strength"; Transliteration: "Shin no Tsuyo sa" (Japanese: 真の強さ)	Shigeki Awai	Kunihiko Okada	Takeshi Mori	December 28, 2024
12	12	"Eight Heads"; Transliteration: "Yattsu no Atama" (Japanese: 八つの頭)	Tadayoshi Kusaka	Takayo Igami	Dojagagen	January 4, 2025
13	13	"Sharing the Same Dream"; Transliteration: "Onaji Yume o Egaite" (Japanese: 同じ夢を描いて)	Masayuki Iimura	Kenta Ihara	Dojagagen	January 11, 2025
14	14	"The Race to Raise Money"; Transliteration: "Kinsaku Honsō" (Japanese: 金策奔走)	Tomihiko Ohkubo	Kenta Ihara	Tomihiko Ohkubo	January 18, 2025
15	15	"Like a River's Flow"; Transliteration: "Kawa no Nagare no Yō ni" (Japanese: 川の流れのように)	Hiromichi Matano	Kunihiko Okada	Yoshihisa Matsumoto	January 25, 2025
16	16	"To Battle"; Transliteration: "Shutsujin" (Japanese: 出陣)	Kyohei Taisu	Takayo Igami	Takeshi Mori	February 1, 2025
17	17	"A Place to Belong"; Transliteration: "Ibasho" (Japanese: 居場所)	Tadayoshi Kusaka	Haryo Shunme	Dojagagen	February 8, 2025
18	18	"Man of the Soil"; Transliteration: "Tsuchi no Ningen" (Japanese: 土の人間)	Tadayoshi Kusaka	Kenta Ihara	Koichi Ohata	February 15, 2025
19	19	"Successor"; Transliteration: "Keishōsha" (Japanese: 継承者)	Shigeki Awai & Fumio Maezono	Kunihiko Okada	Takeshi Mori	February 22, 2025
20	20	"Prepared for What Comes"; Transliteration: "Kakugo no Ue" (Japanese: 覚悟の上)	Hiromichi Matano	Takayo Igami	Takeshi Mori	March 1, 2025
21	21	"Crime and Fortune"; Transliteration: "Tsumi to Miyuki" (Japanese: 罪と幸)	Tadayoshi Kusaka	Kenta Ihara	Dojagagen	March 8, 2025
22	22	"Those Who Struggle"; Transliteration: "Aragau Monotachi" (Japanese: 抗う者たち)	Tomohiko Ohkubo	Kunihiko Okada	Tomohiko Ohkubo	March 15, 2025
23	23	"Ties"; Transliteration: "Tsunagari" (Japanese: 繋がり)	Fumio Maezono	Kenta Ihara	Kia Asamiya	March 22, 2025
24	24	"The Blue Oath"; Transliteration: "Ao no Chikai" (Japanese: 青の誓い)	Tadayoshi Kusaka	Kenta Ihara	Dojagagen	March 29, 2025

===== Season 2 (2025–2026) =====
No. overall	No. in season	Title	Directed by	Written by	Storyboarded by	Original release date
25	1	"Wild Brawl"; Transliteration: "Bōsō Rantō" (Japanese: 暴走乱闘)	Tomohiko Ohkubo	Kenta Ihara	Kumiko Habara & Nobuyoshi Habara	December 20, 2025
26	2	"The Path of Humanity"; Transliteration: "Hito no Michi" (Japanese: 人の道)	Nobuyoshi Habara & Lee Ki-Sup	Kunihiko Okada	Nobuyoshi Habara, Yoshihisa Matsumoto & Takeshi Mori	December 27, 2025
27	3	"A Lone Sheep"; Transliteration: "Iihiki no Hitsuji" (Japanese: 一匹の羊)	Fumio Maezono	Takayo Igami	Tomohiko Ohkubo	January 10, 2026
28	4	"Infamy"; Transliteration: "Akumei" (Japanese: 悪名)	Tadayoshi Kusaka & Hideya Yoshida	Kenta Ihara	Takeshi Mori	January 17, 2026
29	5	"Firefly Glow"; Transliteration: "Hotaru no Hikari" (Japanese: 蛍の光)	Kyohei Taisu & Kumiko Habara	Kunihiko Okada	Kumiko Habara	January 24, 2026
30	6	"Discord"; Transliteration: "Fukyōwaon" (Japanese: 不協和音)	Tadayoshi Kusaka	Takayo Igami	Dojagagen	January 31, 2026
31	7	"The Ultimate Duo"; Transliteration: "Saikyō no Futari" (Japanese: 最強の二人)	Naoki Taira	Kenta Ihara	Kyohei Taisu	February 7, 2026
32	8	"Near Yet Far"; Transliteration: "Chikakute Tōi" (Japanese: 近くて遠い)	Tadayoshi Kusaka	Kunihiko Okada	Dojagagen	February 14, 2026
33	9	"The Path of Carnage"; Transliteration: "Shura no Michi" (Japanese: 修羅の道)	Hiromichi Matano & Miho Hiroshima	Takayo Igami	Takeshi Mori	February 21, 2026
34	10	"The Arena"; Transliteration: "Dohyō" (Japanese: 土俵)	Hideya Yoshida & Akizumi Kaneko	Kenta Ihara	Takeshi Mori	February 28, 2026
35	11	"A Clumsy Sword"; Transliteration: "Busaikuna Ittō" (Japanese: 不細工な一刀)	Kyohei Taisu	Kunihiko Okada	Takeshi Mori	March 7, 2026
36	12	"Kamo Serizawa"; Transliteration: "Serizawa Kamo" (Japanese: 芹沢鴨)	Eiichi Kuboyama	Takayo Igami	Takeshi Mori	March 14, 2026
37	13	"The Blue Era"; Transliteration: "Ao no Jidai" (Japanese: 青の時代)	Nobuyoshi Habara	Kenta Ihara	Nobuyoshi Habra, Kumiko Habara & Tomonori Kogawa	March 21, 2026
38	14	"The Song of Beginnings"; Transliteration: "Hajimari no Uta" (Japanese: はじまりのうた)	Tomohiko Ohkubo	Kenta Ihara	Tomohiko Ohkubo	March 28, 2026
