= Moeyo Ken =

Novel by Ryōtarō Shiba

Moeyo Ken (燃えよ剣; "Burn, O Sword") is a novel by Japanese author Ryōtarō Shiba. It dramatizes the life of Hijikata Toshizō, a member of the Shinsengumi, active in Japan during the bakumatsu (the end of the Tokugawa shogunate).

The novel was initially serialized from 1962 to 1964 in the Bungeishunjū weekly magazine Shūkan Bunshun. Shinchosha published the complete novel in two volumes. The action takes place in the Ōkunitama Shrine in Fuchū, along the Asa River in and near Hachiōji, in the Mibu area of Kyoto, and in Hokkaidō.

Shochiku released a 1966 film of the same title. Asahi Kurizuka played Hijikata. He repeated the role in the prime-time television jidaigeki on NET.

== Movie and TV adaptations ==
=== Cast (1966 film) ===
- Asahi Kurizuka as Hijikata Toshizō
- Shun'ya Wazaki as Kondō Isami
- Hidehiko Ishikura as Okita Sōji
- Tetsuko Kobayashi as Sae
- Keiji Takamiya as Niimi Nishiki

=== Cast (1966 TV series) ===
- Ryōhei Uchida as Hijikata Toshizō
- Asao Koike as Kondō Isami
- Ryōtarō Sugi as Okita Sōji
- Reiko Hitomi as Osae

=== Cast (1970 TV series) ===
- Asahi Kurizuka as Hijikata Toshizō
- Gen Funabashi as Kondō Isami
- Junshi Shimada as Okita Sōji
- Jūkei Fujioka as Endō
- Susumu Kurobe as Nagakura Shinpachi
- Ryō Nishida as Harada Sanosuke
- Seiya Nakano as Yamazaki Susumu
- Eizō Kitamura as Inoue Genzaburō

=== Cast (1990 TV mini-series) ===
- Kōji Yakusho as Hijikata Toshizō
- Tomoko Ogawa as Oyuki
- Tetsuo Ishidate as Kondō Isami
- Terutake Tsuji as Okita Sōji
- Hisako Manda as Sae
- Masaomi Kondō as Itō Kashitarō

=== Cast (2021 film) ===
- Junichi Okada as Hijikata Toshizō
- Ko Shibasaki as Oyuki
- Ryohei Suzuki as Kondō Isami
- Ryosuke Yamada as Okita Sōji
- Hideaki Itō as Serizawa Kamo

=== Manga ===
- Moeyo Ken (2021–present) (written by Emeru Komatsu and illustrated by Yoshiki Kanata; serialized on Comic Bunch Kai)

== Sources ==
- This article incorporates material from 燃えよ剣 (Moeyo Ken) in the Japanese Wikipedia, retrieved on March 15, 2008.
