= Juban =

Juban may refer to:

- Juban (Upper Yafa), a sheikhdom and dependency of Upper Yafa
- Juban, Albania, a settlement in Shkodër County
- Juban, Iran, a village in Gilan Province, Iran
- Juban, Sorsogon, a municipality in the Philippines
- Juban District, Dhale Governorate, Yemen
- Jewban or Juban, a Jewish Cuban
- Azabu-Jūban, in Minato, Tokyo, Japan
- An undergarment worn underneath a kimono

== See also ==
- Juba (disambiguation), of whose various meanings "Juban" may be the adjective form
- Juband, a village in East Azerbaijan Province, Iran
