= Ichimura Tetsunosuke =

Japanese Shinsengumi member

- 市村 鉄之助
- Born: 1854; Ōgaki Domain, Mino Province, Japan
- Died: 1873 (aged 18–19)
- Relatives: Ichimura Hanemoki (father); Ichimura Tatsunosuke (brother)
- Military career
- Allegiance: Tokugawa bakufu
- Branch: Shinsengumi
- Service years: 1867—1869
- Conflicts: Boshin War: Battle of Toba–Fushimi; Battle of Koshu-Katsunuma; Battle of Bonari Pass; Battle of Futamata; Battle of Hakodate

Ichimura Tetsunosuke (市村 鉄之助; 1854 — 1873) was a Japanese member of the Shinsengumi and Hijikata Toshizō's page. Although commonly believed to be a fictional character, Ichimura Tetsunosuke was a real member of the Shinsengumi.

== History ==
Born in 1854, Tetsunosuke was the third son of Ichimura Hanemoki of the Ōgaki Domain, Mino Province, Japan. In 1859, his father was expelled from the Ōgaki Domain, so he was raised in a village in Ōmi Province (present day Nagahama, Shiga Prefecture) and lived with his close relatives there.

In 1867, he joined the Shinsengumi with his older brother Ichimura Tatsunosuke (1846 – March 15, 1872) when he was 14 years old and was the attendant of Vice Commander Hijikata Toshizō.

In 1868, Tatsunosuke left the Kōyō Chinbutai (the renamed Shinsengumi) after the Battle of Kōshū-Katsunuma. However, Tetsunosuke decided to stay with the group. He and the group continued to fight in Aizu, Sendai and later arrived at Republic of Ezo.

During the final battle of the Boshin War, the Battle of Hakodate, Ichimura Tetsunosuke was summoned by Hijikata on June 14 (lunar calendar May 5), 1869, to a private room in an inn. There, Ichimura was entrusted with Hijikata's death poem, a katana, a letter, a photograph of Hijikata, and several strands of Hijikata's hair. He was instructed to bear them to the home of Satō Hikogorō (Hijikata's brother-in-law) in Hino. Ichimura insisted on staying with Hijikata's side and fight to the death, asked him to look for someone else to deliver them, but Hijikata threatened to kill him should he refused to obey him.

Ichimura reluctantly carried out his orders and left. As he departed from the fortress Goryōkaku, he looked back and saw someone who he believed to be Hijikata watching him from the distance through a small opening in the gate.

He later learned of his master's death on the ship to Yokohama.

Ichimura arrived in Hino three months later. When he arrived at Satō's home he reported the news, and later recounted that there were none that did not weep. Ichimura stayed at Sato's house for two to three years. Later, he returned to Ōgaki, where he was reunited with his brother Tatsunosuke.

== Death ==
There are a few theories regarding the date of Ichimura Tetsunosuke's death. It is believed that he died from an illness in his house in Ōgaki in 1873, but according to the relatives of Shimada Kai and tradition of the Kishi family, Tetsunosuke joined Saigō Takamori's army and died during the Satsuma Rebellion in 1877. Therefore, the date of his death is uncertain.

== In popular culture ==
Ichimura Tetsunosuke is the protagonist of the manga and anime series Peacemaker Kurogane, which focuses around the exploits of the famous Shinsengumi. He is 15 years old (16 in the manga) and rather short. His brother Tatsunosuke also joins him for the series.

Ichimura is also featured in the anime series, Intrigue in the Bakumatsu - Irohanihoheto, Katsugeki/Touken Ranbu, the short OVA Hijikata Toshizou - Shiro no Kiseki, video game Fu-un Bakumatsu-den and in NHK's 2011 series Shinsengumi Keppuroku.

Ichimura is portrayed by Sosuke Ikematsu in NHK's Shinsengumi!!: Hijikata Toshizo Saigo no Ichinichi.

Ichimura is also a supporting character in Shin Teito Monogatari, the prequel to the bestselling historical fantasy novel Teito Monogatari (Hiroshi Aramata).

Gintama character Sasaki Tetsunosuke is loosely based on him, being a new Shinsengumi recruit and assistant to Hijikata Toshirō (based on Hijikata Toshizō), but also as a younger brother to Sasaki Isaburō (based on Mimawarigumi member Sasaki Tadasaburō, presumed to be the one who orchestrated the assassination of Sakamoto Ryōma, which is also present in the series as Sakamoto Tatsuma).
