= Nagakura Shinpachi =

Samurai (1839–1915)

Nagakura Shinpachi Noriyuki
- 永倉 新八 載之
- Born: May 23, 1839; Edo, Japan
- Died: January 5, 1915 (aged 75); Otaru, Hokkaido, Japan
- Burial place: Itabashi, Tokyo, Japan
- Other names: Sugimura Harunobu; Sugimura Yoshie
- Spouse(s): Kotsune (died 1867) Sugimura Kine (m. 1871–1915)
- Children: Okada Isoko (daughter), with Kotsune; Sugimura Yoshitarō (son), with Sugimura Kine
- Relatives: Nagakura Kanji (father)
- Military career
- Allegiance: Tokugawa bakufu
- Branch: Rōshigumi (former); Mibu Rōshigumi (former); Shinsengumi (former); Seiheitai
- Service years: 1862–1869
- Rank: assistant vice commander captain of the Shinsengumi 2nd unit
- Commands: Shinsengumi 2nd unit
- Conflicts: Ikedaya incident Kinmon incident Aburanokōji incident Boshin War: Battle of Toba–Fushimi; Battle of Kōshū-Katsunuma; Battle of Utsunomiya Castle
- Other work: Kenjutsu teacher

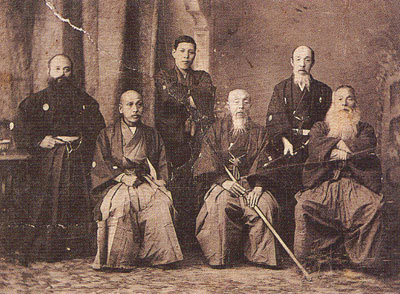
Nagakura (3rd from the right), as Sugimura Yoshie in his later years

Nagakura Shinpachi (永倉 新八; May 23, 1839 – January 5, 1915) was the captain of the 2nd troop of the Shinsengumi, He was later known as Sugimura Yoshie (杉村 義衛) during the Meiji era.

== History ==
=== Early life ===
Nagakura Shinpachi Noriyuki, known as Eikichi or Eiji during his childhood, was born in the Matsumae clan's "kami-yashiki" (upper residence) in Edo on the 11th day of the fourth month of Tenpō 10 (May 23, 1839). His father, Nagakura Kanji, was a retainer of the Matsumae clan, with a 150 koku stipend. Like Okita Sōji, Nagakura was a true product of the Edo period — being a son of a retainer (of a domain he had never seen), who had lived in Edo his entire life.

Nagakura's father spelled the family name with the "naga" meaning "long", but Nagakura later spelled it with the "naga" meaning "eternity". At eight, Nagakura entered Okada Juusuke Toshisada's Shindō Munen-ryū dojo; at age eighteen he reached mokuroku (6th dan), and received the menkyo kaiden certification. At age nineteen he left the service of the Matsumae clan in order to travel and improve his technique. He spent some time at Yurimoto Shuuzou's Shintō Munen Ryu dojo. Nagakura also spent time at Tsubouchi Shume's Shingyoto Ryu dojo, where he met Shimada Kai, the future vice-captain of the Shinsengumi 2nd unit. Around 1861, he started "taking his meals" at Kondō Isami's Shieikan.

=== Rōshigumi ===
In 1863 (Bunkyū 3), Nagakura and Kondō joined the Rōshigumi. Upon arrival in Kyoto however, the Rōshigumi was immediately disbanded. While most of the Rōshigumi returned to Edo, Nagakura, Kondō, Hijikata Toshizō, Serizawa Kamo were among nineteen Roshigumi members stayed behind in Kyoto.

=== Shinsengumi ===
The Mibu Rōshigumi was formed by the Kyoto Shugoshoku ("Kyoto Protector") Matsudaira Higo no Kami (Katamori, of Aizu), and headed by Kondō and Serizawa.

After the events of the 18th day of the 8th month (September 18, 1863), the group became known as Shinsengumi. Nagakura became a fukuchou jokin (assistant vice commander) in 1863.

On July 8, 1864, during the Ikedaya incident, Nagakura was one of ten members which included Okita Sōji, Tōdō Heisuke, and Kondō being the leader of the first group to raid inside the Ikedaya Inn, he later suffered a deep wound on his left thumb and his sword was broken during the battle. A month later on August 20, 1864, he was also involved in the Kinmon incident along with Kondō, Okita and several others to suppress the Chōshū rebellion at the Hamaguri Gate of the Imperial Palace.

He then became the captain of the 2nd unit in 1865. Together with the rest of the Shinsengumi, he became a hatamoto in June 1867.

On December 13, 1867, Nagakura was involved with Harada Sanosuke and several other Shinsengumi members during the Aburanokōji incident with the ambush of Itō Kashitarō's Goryō Eji Kōdai-ji faction, which consisted of a small group of Shinsengumi defectors. Seven of these defectors were trying to retrieve Itō's body, who was assassinated earlier and left at the crossroad of Aburanokōji-Shichijō as a trap. Three of them had been assassinated during the ambush, while the remaining four fled.

Nagakura had a daughter Iso (磯) with a geisha from Shimabara Kameya in Kyoto known only by her stage name as Kotsune (小常), who died after her birth in December 1867. Due to the approaching Boshin War, Nagakura was not able to attend to her burial. Fortunately he managed to arrange for his infant daughter to be brought up by Kotsune's sister, who lived in a village of Fudoson not far from Kyoto. Assumed that he would never see his daughter again, Nagakura gave the family 50 ryo to cover the child expenses.

=== Boshin war ===
On January 27, 1868, in the Battle of Toba–Fushimi in Kyoto, Nagakura shown his courage by leading the members of a suicide squad Kesshitai (決死隊) and charging with a sword towards the bullet-firing Imperial Army.

Right after the Battle of Kōshū-Katsunuma in April 1868, Nagukura and Harada Sanosuke left the Kōyō Chinbutai (the renamed Shinsengumi) after disagreements with long-time comrades Kondo and Hijikata. According to Nagakura, Kondō wanted the surviving men to become his retainers; Nagakura, Harada, and a few others staunchly refused. Nagakura and Harada, taking with them some other members, joined with a group of former Tokugawa retainers with Haga Gidou being one of them to form a new unit, the Seiheitai. Nagakura and the Seiheitai unit left Edo shortly after Edo Castle's surrender, and participated in some battles against the Imperial forces in the Battle of Utsunomiya Castle and at Imaichi and headed north, hoped to take part in the fighting that was moving northward, toward Aizu. But upon receiving news of the surrender of the Aizu Domain, Nagakura and the unit returned to Edo.

=== Meiji Restoration ===
While in Edo, he had to hide for a while because he had fought against the Imperial forces and would turn himself in to the senior councilor Shimokuni Toshichiro of the Matsumae clan and served as an infantry instructor and was stipended at his father's original rate of 150 koku.

However, he would often run into Suzuki Mikisaburō, the younger brother of deceased Itō Kashitarō and one of the four Shinsengumi defectors who narrowly escaped from the assassination attempt during the Aburanokōji incident back then in December 1867. Due to his involvement in that incident and suspecting that Suzuki was trying to kill him, Nagakura returned to Matsumae, Hokkaido in late 1868 (Meiji 1).

In 1871 (Meiji 4), Nagakura married Sugimura Kine (杉村 きね), daughter of the physician Sugimura Kaname (杉村 介庵) (Shouhaku (松柏)). In 1873 (Meiji 6), he was adopted into his wife's family and changed his name first to Sugimura Harunobu (杉村 治備), and later Sugimura Yoshie (杉村 義衛). Their only son, Sugimura Yoshitarō (杉村 義太郎) was born on February 24, 1873.

Later in 1875, Sugimura Yoshie, with the help of the physician Matsumoto Ryōjun and several surviving former Shinsengumi comrades including Fujita Gorō (formerly Saitō Hajime) among others, erected the monument known as the Grave of Shinsengumi for Kondō Isami, Hijikata Toshizō, and the fallen comrades of the Shinsengumi at Jutoku-ji temple boundary in Itabashi, Tokyo and held requiems for their past comrades' souls.

In 1882 (Meiji 15), Sugimura moved his family to Otaru, Hokkaido, and was invited by the police bureaucrat Tsukigata Kiyoshi to work as kenjutsu teacher to train the prison guards in Kabato prison for four years. Following his retirement in 1886 (Meiji 19), he opened a dojo to teach kendo at Asakusa, Taitō, Tokyo. Sugimura later moved back to Otaru in 1889 (Meiji 22) when his wife and son opened a pharmacy there.

In 1900 (Meiji 33), Sugimura was on his way to attend the funeral of his former Shinsengumi comrade Shimada Kai in Kyoto, he was reunited with his daughter Isoko there, who had become a well-known geisha actress of the Kansai region under the stage name Ogami Kogame (尾上 小亀). Following their reunion, Sugimura and Isoko would never meet again. Isoko was later adopted into the Okada family and took the name of Okada Isoko (岡田 磯子).

In 1905 (Meiji 38), Sugimura moved again and lived at Midori 1-chome near the Otaru Juvenile Science Museum. Sugimura's geisha daughter Isoko died on December 21, 1905, at the age of 39. In late July 1909 (Meiji 42), he moved again to Hanazono, Otaru, where he taught kendo at the club of the Tohoku Imperial University's Faculty of Agricultural (present day location of Hokkaido University).

In 1911 (Meiji 44), he gave an oral background of the Shinsengumi to a journalist for a newspaper. It is believed that since the reports were given half a century after the events, the accounts were more for pleasing crowds than a faithful record. Sugimura did however, write his memoirs that can testify first hand to the bloody lifetime of the Shinsengumi. He had lent his written memoirs to an acquaintance long before his newspaper interview, but the memoirs were never returned to him. Sugimura Yoshie's memoirs were lost for decades before being found in 1998 and was published in book form.

== Death ==
Sugimura Yoshie died of periostitis caused by caries and sepsis on January 5, 1915 (Taisho 4). He was seventy-six. His last words was "Kui wa nai (悔いはない, No regrets)". Upon his will, he was buried at the Grave of Shinsengumi, Itabashi, Tokyo. Coincidentally, later in this same year, Fujita Gorō died at the age of seventy-two from a stomach ulcer on September 28.

== Notable work ==
- Shinsengumi Tenmatsuki (1998)

== Nagakura in Fiction ==
Accounts of Nagakura's time before and during his Shinsengumi period appear in novels, period dramas and anime/manga series.

Nagakura is featured in Peacemaker Kurogane (anime/manga), Hakodate Youjin Buraichou Himegami (manga), Kaze Hikaru (manga), Rurouni Kenshin: The Hokkaido Arc (manga), Getsumei Seiki (manga), Golden Kamuy (anime/manga), 2004 NHK Taiga drama series Shinsengumi!, Shinsengumi Gunrou-den (video game series), Hakuouki (video game series and 2010 anime), Bakumatsu Renka Shinsengumi (video game series), and Fate/Grand Order. Shimura Shinpachi from the manga/anime Gintama is loosely based on Nagakura.

Nagakura is prominently featured in the 2014 historical fiction The Soldier and the Samurai.(ISBN 1500183059)

Nagakura is portrayed in the 2014 video game Ryu Ga Gotoku Ishin!, a spinoff of the Yakuza franchise, and its 2023 remaster. He shares his appearance and voice with series regular Taiga Saejima.

== Recommended reading ==
- Kimura, Sachihiko. Shinsengumi Nikki. Tokyo: PHP Interface. 2003. ISBN 4-569-63008-1
- Nagakura, Shinpachi. "Shinsengumi Tenmatsuki". Tokyo: Shin Jinbutsu Oraisha, 1998. ISBN 4404026706.

== Bibliography ==
- Shinsengumi Tenmatsuki. Tokyo: Shin Jinbutsu Oraisha, 1971. ASIN 440400284X
