= Shinsengumi =

Japanese special police force (1863–1869)

- 新選組
- Flag of Shinsengumi
- Active: August 18, 1863
- Disbanded: June 23, 1869
- Country: Kyoto, Japan
- Allegiance: Tokugawa bakufu
- Branch: Rōshigumi (disbanded in 1863); Bakufu Army
- Type: Security agency
- Size: 302
- Colors: light blue, white
- Engagements: Ikedaya incident; Kinmon incident; Zenzaiya incident; Akebonotei incident; Sanjo Seisatsu incident; Aburanokōji incident; Second Chōshū expedition; Tenmaya incident; Boshin War; Battle of Toba–Fushimi; Battle of Kōshū-Katsunuma; Battle of Utsunomiya Castle; Battle of Shirakawa; Battle of Bonari Pass; Battle of Aizu; Battle of Miyako Bay; Battle of Futamata; Battle of Hakodate (surrendered)

Commanders
- Notable commanders: Serizawa Kamo (1863); Kondō Isami (1863–1868); Tonouchi Yoshio (1863); Hijikata Toshizō (1868–1869); Saitō Hajime (1868); Sōma Kazue (1869)

The Shinsengumi (新選組, "Newly Selected Corps") was a small secret police organization, an elite group of swordsmen organized by commoners and low-ranking samurai, commissioned by the bakufu (military government) during Japan's Bakumatsu period (late Tokugawa shogunate) in 1863. It was active until 1869. It was founded to protect shogunate representatives in Kyoto at a time when a controversial imperial edict to exclude foreign trade from Japan had been made and the Chōshū clan had been forced from the imperial court. They gained considerable fame from events such as the Ikedaya incident and the August 18 coup, among others. The members were drawn from the sword schools of Edo.

== History ==
=== Rōshigumi ===
Japan's forced opening to the west in 1854, which required it to open its shores for trade or face military conflict, exacerbated internal political instability. One long-standing line of political opinion was sonnō jōi (meaning, "revere the emperor, expel the barbarians"). Loyalists (particularly in Chōshū Domain) in Kyoto began to rebel. In response, the Tokugawa shogunate formed the Rōshigumi (浪士組, "the rōnin squad") on October 19, 1862. The Rōshigumi was a squad of 234 rōnin (samurai without masters) drawn from the sword schools of Edo.

The squad's nominal commander was the hatamoto Matsudaira Katamori, and their leader was Kiyokawa Hachirō, a rōnin from Shōnai Domain. The Rōshigumi's mission was to protect Tokugawa Iemochi, the 14th shōgun, during an important trip to Kyoto to meet with the Emperor Kōmei. There had not been such a meeting since the third shōgun of the Tokugawa bakufu, Tokugawa Iemitsu, had visited Kyoto in the 17th century. Tokugawa Iemochi, the head of the military government, the bakufu, had been invited to discuss how Japan should enact the recent imperial edict calling for the expulsion of foreigners.

Although the Rōshigumi was funded by the Tokugawa bakufu, the leader Kiyokawa Hachirō and others had strong loyalties to the emperor and planned to gather other rōnin in Kyoto to police the city from insurgents. On March 26 (lunar calendar February 8), 1863, Kiyokawa led the Rōshigumi out of Edo as the vanguard of shōgun Iemochi's procession to Kyoto, which they arrived on April 10 (lunar calendar February 23), 1863.

=== Mibu Rōshigumi ===
When Kiyokawa's scheme was revealed in Kyoto, he immediately commanded the Rōshigumi to return to Edo. The members were disbanded and then returned to Edo where they would later form the Shinchōgumi (新徴組) under the patronage of Shōnai Domain. However, nineteen Rōshigumi members, mainly from the Mito clan, remained and formed the Mibu Rōshigumi (壬生浪士組).

==== Founding members ====
Serizawa's faction:

- Serizawa Kamo
- Niimi Nishiki
- Hirayama Gorō
- Hirama Jūsuke
- Noguchi Kenji
- Araya Shingorō
- Saeki Matasaburō

Kondō's faction:

- Kondō Isami
- Hijikata Toshizō
- Inoue Genzaburō
- Okita Sōji
- Nagakura Shinpachi
- Saitō Hajime
- Harada Sanosuke
- Tōdō Heisuke
- Yamanami Keisuke

Tonouchi's faction:

- Tonouchi Yoshio
- Iesato Tsuguo
- Abiru Eisaburō
- Negishi Yūzan

Initially, the Mibu Rōshigumi were called Miburō (壬生浪), meaning "rōnin of Mibu". At the time, Mibu was a village south west of Kyoto, and was the place where they were stationed. Mibu Rōshigumi was initially formed in three factions under Serizawa (the Mito group), Kondō (the Shieikan group) and Tonouchi. Abiru Eisaburō later died of illness, a month after arriving in Kyoto.

Internal strife soon developed within the group, Tonouchi was assassinated by Kondō on Yojō bridge, Serizawa had ordered a member, Iesato Tsuguo, to commit seppuku for deserting, and Negishi Yūzan also deserted and returned to Edo, where he joined the Shinchōgumi.

=== Shinsengumi ===
Flag of the Shinsengumi, with the kanji character 誠 (makoto), meaning 'sincerity' or 'fidelity', and a serrated border at the lower edge to match the distinctive 'white mountain stripes' of their outfits.

Matsudaira Katamori, after the careful evaluation of the political scene in Kyoto, felt it was needed to change the scope of the Mibu Rōshigumi's mission from protecting the shogunate to patrolling the streets of Kyoto and restoring order in the name of the Tokugawa bakufu. On August 18, 1863, the Mibu Rōshigumi was renamed the Shinsengumi.

The new name Shinsengumi may have been coined by Matsudaira Katamori (the daimyō of the Aizu clan) around this time. (Note: An argument for Matsudaira Katamori bestowing the name can be made by comparing the similarity of the name Shinsengumi to one of Aizu's later frontline combat units, the Bessengumi (別選組, the "Separately Selected Corps").) The opposition forces included the Mori clan of the Chōshū and the Shimazu clan of Satsuma.

The Shinsengumi were led by Serizawa Kamo (born 1830, Mino Province), Niimi Nishiki, and Kondō Isami (born 1834, Musashi Province – he came from a small dojo in Edo called Shieikan). The Shinsengumi submitted a letter to the Aizu clan, another powerful group who supported the Tokugawa regime, requesting permission to police Kyoto. The request was granted.

Saeki Matasaburō, having killed Araya Shingorō, is believed to have been killed by a Chōshū samurai Kusaka Genzui on September 22, 1863.

On September 30, 1863 (lunar calendar August 18), the Chōshū (anti-Tokugawa) clan were forced from the imperial court by the Tokugawa, Aizu and Satsuma clans. The Shinsengumi were sent to aid the Aizu and guard the gates of the imperial court. The opposition forces included the Mori clan of the Chōshū and the Shimazu clan of Satsuma.

Serizawa's erratic and disruptive behavior in Kyoto eventually led to Matsudaira Katamori of Aizu giving the Shinsengumi an order to assassinate Serizawa and his group. On October 19, 1863, Niimi Nishiki, a member of the Serizawa faction was forced by Yamanami Keisuke and Hijikata Toshizō to commit seppuku for breaking regulations. On October 30 (or October 28), a few selected Shinsengumi members led by Hijikata went into the Yagi Gennojō's house and assassinated Serizawa, his lover Oume, and Hirayama Goro, with Hirama Jūsuke being the only survivor who fled that night. All this infighting left Kondō as leader. Three months later, Noguchi Kenji was ordered to commit seppuku for an unknown reason.

On July 8, 1864, in an incident at the Ikedaya Inn in Kyoto, thirty Shinsengumi suppressed a cell of twenty Chōshū revolutionaries, possibly preventing the burning of Kyoto. The incident made the squad more famous and led to soldiers enlisting in the squad.

=== Squad hierarchy after Ikedaya ===
- Commander (局長, Kyokuchō): Kondō Isami, fourth master of the Tennen Rishin-ryū
- General Commander (総長, Sōchō): Yamanami Keisuke
- Vice Commander (副長, Fukuchō): Hijikata Toshizō
- Military Advisor (参謀, Sanbō): Itō Kashitarō
- Spies: Shimada Kai and Yamazaki Susumu.

Troop Captains (組長, Kumichō):

- Okita Sōji (instructor in Kenjutsu).
- Nagakura Shinpachi (instructor in Kenjutsu).
- Saitō Hajime (instructor in Kenjutsu).
- Matsubara Chūji (instructor in Jujutsu).
- Takeda Kanryūsai (instructor in military strategies).
- Inoue Genzaburō
- Tani Sanjūrō (instructor in spearing skills).
- Tōdō Heisuke
- Suzuki Mikisaburō
- Harada Sanosuke

=== Members of the group ===
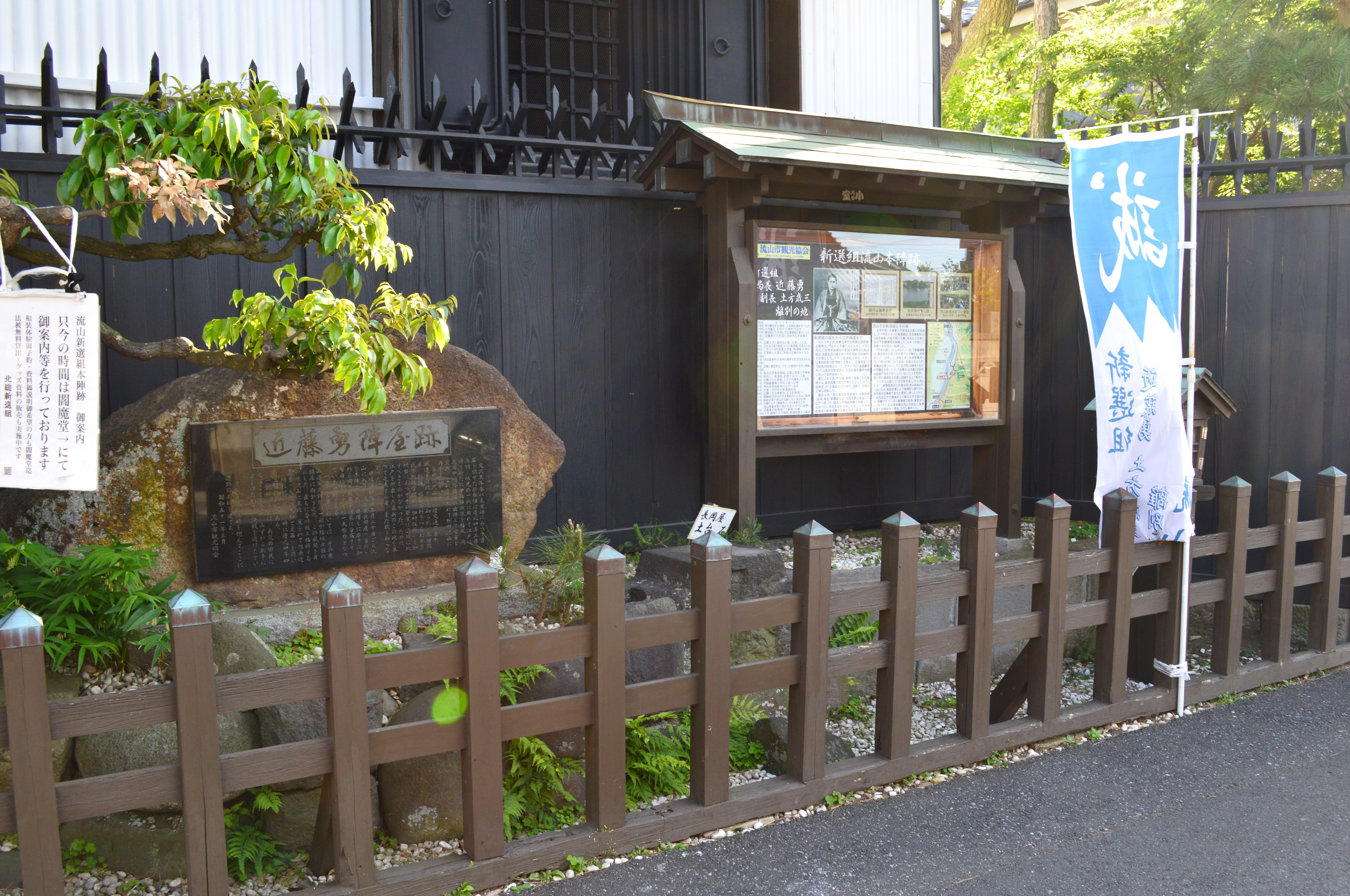
Ancient Kondō Isami's quarters at Nagareyama, Chiba Prefecture, Japan. One of the former Shinsengumi headquarters

At its peak, the Shinsengumi had about 300 members. They were the first samurai group of the Tokugawa era to allow those from non-samurai classes (farmers and merchants, for example) to join. Many joined the group out of a desire to become samurai and be involved in political affairs. However, it is a misconception that most of the Shinsengumi members were from non-samurai classes. Out of 106 Shinsengumi members (among a total of 302 members at the time), there were 87 samurai, eight farmers, three merchants, three medical doctors, three priests, and two craftsmen. Several of the leaders, such as Sannan, Okita, Saitō, Nagakura, and Harada, were born samurai.

=== Shinsengumi regulations ===
The code of the Shinsengumi, famously created by Hijikata Toshizō, included five articles, prohibiting deviation from the samurai code (bushido), leaving the Shinsengumi, raising money privately, taking part in others' litigation, and engaging in private fights. The penalty for breaking any rule was seppuku. In addition, if the leader of a unit was mortally wounded in a fight, all the members of the unit must fight and die on the spot and, even in a fight where the death toll was high, the unit was not allowed to retrieve the bodies of the dead, except the corpse of the leader of the unit.

=== Uniform ===
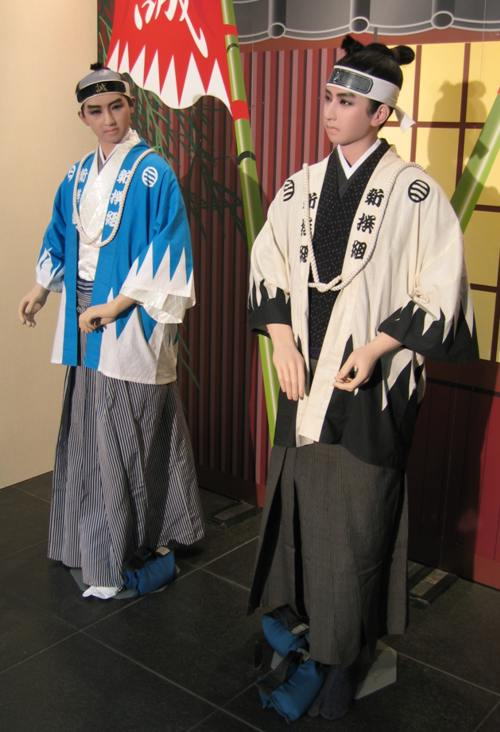
Mannequins dressed in Shinsengumi uniform

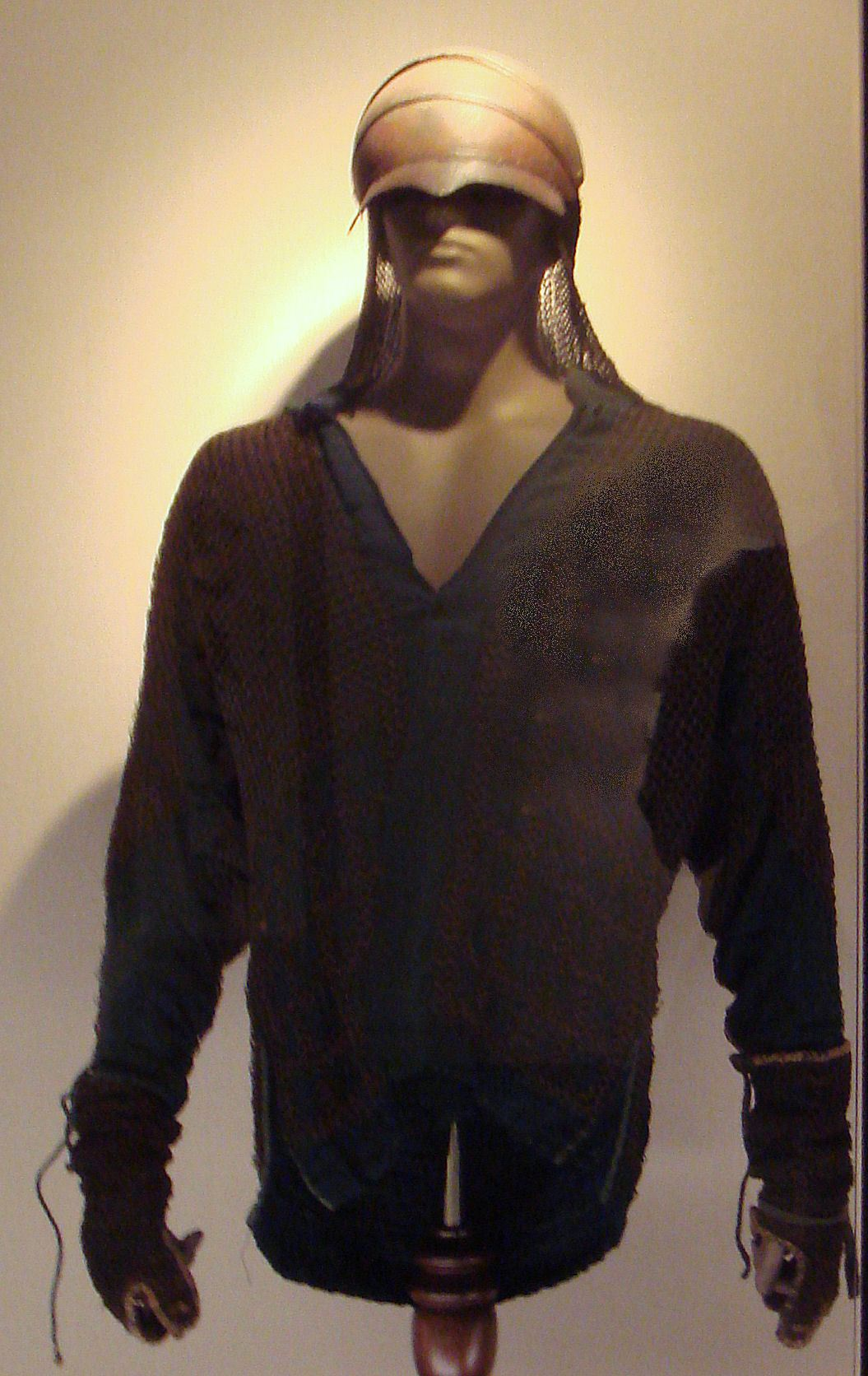
Coat of mail and helmet of Kondō Isami

The members of the Shinsengumi were highly visible in battle due to their distinctive uniforms. Following the orders of the Shinsengumi commander Serizawa Kamo, the standard uniform consisted of the haori and hakama over a kimono, with a white cord called a tasuki crossed over the chest and tied in the back. The function of the tasuki was to prevent the sleeves of the kimono from interfering with movement of the arms. The Shinsengumi wore a light chainmail suit beneath their robes and a light helmet made of iron.

The uniform was best defined by the haori, which was colored asagi-iro (浅葱色, light blue). In the old days of Japan, during the ritual, the samurai committing seppuku would wear an asagi-iro kamishimo. Thus the colour, in the samurai's eyes, characterized an honourable death. The haori sleeves were trimmed with "white mountain stripes", resulting in a very distinctive uniform.

The dandara haori appears to have been discontinued after about its first year of use. The last known record of it being worn is testimony stating that members of the Shinsengumi were dressed in it during the Ikedaya incident. Two days after the incident, however, eyewitnesses described the Shinsengumi's attire as consisting of a layered juban, high-waisted hakama, navy kyahan (leggings), a hachimaki tied at the back of the head, and white tasuki.

According to Watanabe Noboru, a samurai of the Ōmura Domain who was being tailed by the Shinsengumi, he could immediately identify his pursuers as Shinsengumi members whenever they were dressed in black robes and black hakama. In addition, an elderly man interviewed in the late Meiji era recalled that the Shinsengumi wore black rasha short-sleeved battle surcoats. These accounts have led to the view that, after the dandara haori was abandoned, the corps adopted an all-black uniform.It has been suggested that the change was made because the distinctive dandara haori was too conspicuous during nighttime operations and unpopular among the members, and also because the new uniform helped erase the influence of Serizawa Kamo, who had originally introduced the earlier uniform.

No original examples of the dandara haori are known to have survived to the present day.

== Boshin War ==
In 1867, when Tokugawa Yoshinobu withdrew from Kyoto, the Shinsengumi left peacefully under the supervision of the wakadoshiyori, Nagai Naoyuki. The new emperor had been named the head of a new government (meaning the end to centuries of military rule by the shōgun). This marked the beginning of the Boshin civil war.

Following their departure from Kyoto, the Shinsengumi were one of the shogunate forces fought in the Battle of Toba–Fushimi against the Imperial forces consisting of allied forces of Chōshū, Satsuma and Tosa in January 1868 where Kondō would suffer a gunshot wound at Fushimi during the battle.

=== Kōyō Chinbutai ===
The Shinsengumi returned to Edo, where it was later reformed into a unit known as the Kōyō Chinbutai (甲陽鎮撫隊, "Pacification Corps") and departed from Edo for Kōfu Castle on March 24 on orders to suppress uprisings there. However, upon receiving news on March 28 that the Kōfu Castle was taken by the Imperial forces led by Itagaki Taisuke, they settled at a town of Katsunuma 5 miles (8.0 km) east of Kōfu.

On March 29, 1868, the Kōyō Chinbutai resisted an attack by the Imperial forces at the Battle of Kōshū-Katsunuma for about two hours but lost, with eight dead and more than thirty wounded, while the Imperial forces had only one dead and twelve wounded. The surviving members were scattered and retreated to Edo.

Right after the Battle of Kōshū-Katsunuma, Nagakura Shinpachi, Harada Sanosuke and some of the members left the Kōyō Chinbutai after disagreements with long-time comrades Kondo and Hijikata and later formed a new unit Seiheitai with a former Tokugawa retainer Haga Gidou as its commander.

On April 11, 1868, the Kōyō Chinbutai departed Edo again and set up a temporary headquarters at the Kaneko family estate, northeast of Edo. They would later move to a new headquarters in Nagareyama on April 25, 1868.

However, on the same day, the Imperial forces' Staff Officer Kagawa Keizō of Mito Domain received news that an armed unit had set up camp at Nagareyama and dispatched the forces there.

=== Death of Kondō Isami ===
During their training at Nagareyama on April 26, 1868, the Kōyō Chinbutai members were caught by surprise by the 200-strong Imperial forces. The Imperial forces' vice-chief of staff Arima Tota of Satsuma Domain ordered Kondō to go with them to their camp at Koshigaya. Kondō was later brought to Itabashi on April 27 for questioning. Kondō was declared guilty of participation in the assassination of Sakamoto Ryōma on April 30, 1868 and was beheaded three weeks later at the Itabashi execution grounds on May 17, 1868.

=== Battle of Aizu ===
Due to Hijikata being incapacitated as a result of the injuries sustained at the Battle of Utsunomiya Castle in May 1868, the Kōyō Chinbutai fought in defense of Aizu territory under Saitō Hajime in the Battle of Shirakawa in June 1868. After the Battle of Bonari Pass in October 1868, when Hijikata decided to retreat from Aizu, Saitō and a small group of Shinsengumi parted with Hijikata and continued to fight alongside the Aizu Domain against the Imperial forces until the very end of the Battle of Aizu, where he and a handful of surviving members were apprehended and became the prisoners-of-war.

=== Joining with the Republic of Ezo ===
In December 1868, Hijikata and the rest of the surviving Shinsengumi joined the forces of the Republic of Ezo in the north.

The Shinsengumi numbers decreased to around one hundred in this period and they fought on despite the surrender of Edo and clear defeat of Tokugawa. In the Battle of Miyako Bay on 6 May 1869, Hijikata led a daring but doomed raid to steal the imperial warship Kōtetsu, in the early morning, from the Kaiten warship, a number of oppositionists, including Nomura Risaburō, managed to board the ship, but were soon mowed down by its Gatling gun. Many others including the captain of Kaiten were also killed by gunfire from the Imperial ships. The battle lasted only thirty minutes and the survivors and Kaiten retreated to Hakodate.

On the fourth week of May 1869, Hijikata led 230 Republic of Ezo forces and the surviving Shinsengumi against the 600 strong Imperial forces during the Battle of Futamata for sixteen hours and were forced to retreat. The Imperial forces attacked again on the next day, only to retreat. On the following night, Hijikata led a successful raid on the Imperial forces' camp, forcing them to flee. Hijikata and his forces would later retreat to Hakodate on June 10.

=== End of the Shinsengumi ===
Hijikata was killed from a gunshot wound on June 20 (lunar calendar May 11), 1869, during the Battle of Hakodate in Hokkaido. Before his death, he wrote of his loyalty to the Tokugawa on the death poem sent by his page Ichimura Tetsunosuke to the house of his brother-in-law:

Though my body may decay on the Island of Ezo,
My spirit guards my lords in the East.

—

A remaining group of survivors, under the last commander Sōma Kazue, who had been under Nagai Naoyuki's supervision at Benten Daiba, surrendered three days later on June 23, (lunar calendar May 14), 1869, marked the end of the Shinsengumi. The forces of the Republic of Ezo would later surrender on June 27, (lunar calendar May 18), 1869, which marked the end of the Boshin War.

A few core members, such as Nagakura Shinpachi, Saitō Hajime, and Shimada Kai survived the war. Some members, such as Takagi Teisaku, went on to become prominent figures.

== Monument ==
In 1875, Nagakura Shinpachi, with the help of the physician Matsumoto Ryōjun and several surviving former Shinsengumi comrades including Saitō Hajime among others, erected the monument for Kondō Isami, Hijikata Toshizō, and the fallen comrades of the Shinsengumi at Jutoku-ji temple boundary known as Graves of Shinsengumi in Itabashi, Tokyo and held requiems for their past comrades' souls.

== In popular culture ==
During its years of activity, the Shinsengumi enjoyed little support among the residents of Kyoto and was feared by the people of Mibu. This has been attributed to cultural and linguistic differences between the Kyoto townspeople and the predominantly Kantō-born leaders, including Kondō, as well as to the tendency of Kyoto society at the time to discriminate against people from other regions.

During the Meiji (1868–1912) and Taisho (1912–1926) periods, the Shinsengumi were generally unpopular. At that time, the Japanese considered the Meiji Restoration a great achievement and regarded the current system centered around Satsuma and Choshu as just. Therefore, the Shinsengumi were perceived as a foolish group resisting the Meiji Restoration. Following the publication of the 1883 novel Kanketsu Senrigoma, amid widespread confusion and conflicting accounts of the late Bakumatsu period, Isami Kondō and Hijikata Toshizō became widely known as the assassins of Sakamoto Ryōma. An 1891 article in the Yomiuri Shimbun also identified Kondō and Hijikata as the perpetrators when reporting on Ryōma's posthumous court rank.

Despite this, Kondō was often portrayed as an exceptional warrior and a man of remarkable valor. This prevailing notion began to change with Kan Shimozawa's novel "Shinsengumi Shimatsuki" (1928). Furthermore, after World War II, there was a reevaluation of history among the Japanese. Ryōtarō Shiba's novel "Moeyo Ken" (1964) gained popularity, spreading empathy towards the way of life of the Shinsengumi. Today, the Shinsengumi is depicted and beloved by people through various media such as novels, movies, dramas, anime, and more. The current anti-establishment political party in Japan, Reiwa Shinsengumi, was led by politician and actor Taro Yamamoto, star of the popular historical television drama series Shinsengumi!.

- The history of the Shinsengumi has been dramatized in many television series, including Shinsengumi Shimatsuki (Shinsengumi, its birth to end) (TBS, 1961); and Shinsengumi Keppuroku (NTV, 1967). In 2004, the Japanese television broadcaster NHK made a year-long television drama series following the history of the Shinsengumi, called Shinsengumi!, which aired on Sunday evenings.
- An early film, The Legend of Shinsengumi (1963) was based on a 1928 novel of the same name.
- In 1969, a full-length film, Shinsengumi: Assassins of Honour, starring Toshiro Mifune was released. It depicted the rise and fall of the Shinsengumi.
- The main characters of Space Battleship Yamato (Japanese: 宇宙戦艦ヤマト, Hepburn: Uchū Senkan Yamato) were named after Shinsengumi members.
- The 1999 film Taboo (Gohatto) depicted the Shinsengumi one year after the Ikedaya affair. The film shows the Shinsengumi's strict code and acceptance of homosexuality among the samurai members.
- In 2003, a Japanese samurai drama, When the Last Sword Is Drawn, depicted the end of the Shinsengumi, focusing on various historical figures such as Saitō Hajime.
- Manga artist Nobuhiro Watsuki is a self-proclaimed fan of the Shinsengumi, and many of his characters in Rurouni Kenshin are based on its members, including Sagara Sanosuke (inspired by Harada Sanosuke); Shinomori Aoshi (modeled after Hijikata Toshizō); Seta Sōjirō (based on Okita Souji); and Saitō Hajime.
- The 2003 manga, Getsu Mei Sei Ki, or Goodbye Shinsengumi, by Kenji Morita depicted the life of Hijikata Toshizō. The manga Kaze Hikaru presents a fictional tale of a girl joining the Shinsengumi in disguise and falling in love with Okita Soji.
- The manga Peacemaker Kurogane by Nanae Chrono is a historical fiction taking place during the end of the Tokugawa period, following a young boy. Ichimura Tetsunosuke, who tries to join the Shinsengumi.
- The anime series Soar High! Isami features three fifth-graders who are fictional descendants of the Shinsengumi and fight against the evil organization the Black Goblin.
- The game, anime and film series Hakuōki (Hakuōki Shinsengumi Kitan, lit. 'Demon of the Fleeting Blossom: The Mysterious Tale of the Shinsengumi') follows a girl looking for her lost father, a doctor who worked with the Shinsengumi. The premise mixes supernatural elements and fictional enemies and historical events. The Shinsengumi characters are fictionalized adaptations of the real members and retain their real names.
- Touken Ranbu, a 2015 free-to-play collectible card browser video game developed by Nitroplus and DMM Games with multiple different spinoff anime series, Touken Ranbu: Hanamaru (2016) and Zoku Touken Ranbu: Hanamaru (2018), both for a younger audience, as well as the more sophisticated Katsugeki/Touken Ranbu (2017), is about a universe in which the legendary swords, spears, and guns of famous warriors from Japan's feudal past are granted human form and come to life in a swashbuckling historical adventure. The swords of Shinsengumi members Okita Souji, Hijikata Toshizo, and Isami Kondo are featured. One of the most prominent characters is Hijikata's longsword, which bore the name Izumi-no-Kami Kanesada.
- The 2004 video game Fu-un Shinsengumi, which was developed by Genki and published by Konami, is based on the Shinsengumi.
- In March 2012, a stand-alone expansion for Total War: Shogun 2 set during the Boshin War was released. Fall of the Samurai features the Shinsengumi as recruitable agents used for assassination and bribery, and as an elite combat unit capable of fighting both at range and in melee.
- Moeyo Ken is a video game and also an anime series about girl members of the Shinsengumi.
- Moeyo Ken ("Burn My Sword") is the name of a famous 1964 novel by Ryōtarō Shiba about the Boshin War (1868 to 1869 CE) from the point of view of Hijikata Toshizō. It is regarded by Shinsengumi fans as the 'bible' of Shinsengumi fiction and was the first literary work to focus on Hijikata; previously, Shinsengumi stories tended to focus on the commander Isami Kondo. Shiba also published short stories about the Shinsengumi. His Shinsengumi fiction has not yet been translated into English; it is available in Japanese and Chinese.
- Shinsengumi Keppūroku Japanese television jidaigeki period drama was broadcast on TV Asahi in 1998.
- The Shinsengumi appear in the mobile game Fate/Grand Order, initially as one of two factions players can side with during the GUDAGUDA 2: Meiji Restoration event. Members of this team include Servant versions of Okita Souji and Hijikata Toshizo, which are both limited-availability Servants. Shinsengumi is also the name of Toshizo's Noble Phantasm, which gets much stronger as his HP gets lower. Furthermore, in GUDAGUDA 5: Yamanataikoku, servant versions of Saitou Hajime, Yamanami Keisuke, and Serizawa Kamo were introduced. As of 2025, Shinsengumi members available as playable party members include Saitou, Yamanami, Nagakura Shinpachi, Harada Sanosuke and Todo Heisuke. The 2025 event Bakumatsu Chanbara Shinwa: GUDAGUDA Shinsengumi The End REVENGE OF MAKOTO prominently featured the Shinsengumi-based characters, among them the first in-game appearanceor Kondou Isami, and included an obtainable Shinsengumi uniform costume for the player character.
- The Shinsengumi feature heavily in the plot of the 2014 video game Ryū ga Gotoku Ishin!. In this game, main protagonist Sakamoto Ryoma, a 19th-century doppelgänger of main series protagonist Kazuma Kiryu, becomes the group's third unit captain under the alias of Saito Hajime.
- The Shinsengumi appears in the app "Bakumatu Hanafuda". Players are confrontations to Shinsengumi members by Koi Koi.
- In the manga Golden Kamuy and its anime adaptation, Hijikata appears as the leader of one of the contending groups trying to locate a cache of gold on Hokkaido soon after the Russo-Japanese War. He would have been in his seventies at the time the story takes place.
- The manga and anime Gintama features its own alternate reality version of the Shinsengumi as regular characters, including members with surnames such as Kondo, Hijikata, and Okita.
- The manga and anime The Blue Wolves of Mibu is a Japanese manga series written and illustrated by Tsuyoshi Yasuda.
- In 2024, Toei produced a television drama based on the 1963 Shinsengumi manga by Osamu Tezuka titled: With You I Bloom: The Shinsengumi Youth Chronicle starring Oku Tomoya and Maeda Kentaro in the leads. The story revolves around two fictional Shinsengumi soldiers Fukakusa Kyujuro and Kamagiri Daisaku. After his father is killed at the hands of the choshu, Kyujuro joins the Shinsengumi to improve his sword skills and avenge his death. At the entrance exam, he meets Daisaku, a promising newcomer with excellent sword skills. Although the two develop a passionate friendship, they are at the mercy of the times and are destined to have to kill each other. This drama also features fictional versions of historical figures such as Kondo Isami, Hijikata Toshizo, Okita Soji, Harada Sanosuke, Saito Hajime, Serizawa Kamo and Sakamoto Ryoma.
- The 2024 video game Rise of the Ronin heavily features the Shinsengumi in Chapter 2, as the player is tasked to join them alongside their ally, Sakamoto Ryoma.

== See also ==
- Battotai
- Hwarang
- Ishin shishi
- Ryōtarō Shiba
- Samurai
- Reiwa Shinsengumi
