= Yamazaki Susumu =

Japanese rōnin and spy

Yamazaki Susumu (山崎 烝)
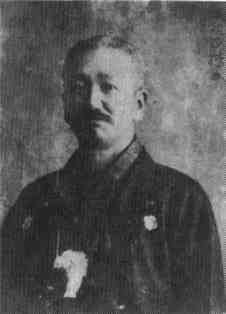
- Born: 1833; Osaka
- Died: February 6, 1868 (aged 35)
- Military career
- Allegiance: Shinsengumi
- Rank: Shinsengumi officer, spy

Yamazaki Susumu (山崎 烝; c. 1833 – February 6, 1868) was a Shinsengumi officer and spy, otherwise known as a kansatsu (監察, inspector).

He was a rōnin (masterless samurai) from Osaka and an expert in Tenshin Shōden Katori Shintō-ryū. In 1863, he officially joined the Shinsengumi and in 1864, Yamazaki and Shimada Kai were assigned by Kondō Isami to investigate the situation which led to the Ikedaya Jiken on July 8. However, there is a theory that Yamazaki's participation in the Ikedaya Jiken is merely fiction by Shimozawa Kan and Shiba Ryōtarō.

His occupation whilst in Kyoto was as a doctor, and the Shinsengumi had originally used his pharmacy as their base before moving on to its later headquarters at Nishihonganji (See Yamanami Keisuke).

Yamazaki was said to be excellent in literary and military arts, having been taught by his uncle. His scholastic talent was necessary when discussing politics with a court noble.

In 1865, he accompanied Kondō to Hiroshima. It is believed that Yamazaki did not return to Kyoto with Kondō until the next year in order to further investigate Chōshū's status.

Yamazaki studied medicine under Matsumoto Ryōjun. According to Matsumoto, Yamazaki was a gentle and taciturn man.

In 1867, Yamazaki became a hatamoto along with the rest of the Shinsengumi.

During the Battle of Toba–Fushimi in 1868, Yamazaki was severely injured and died on February 6. The exact location of his death is debatable, though it is believed he had drowned whilst escaping. He had Kondo and Hijikata Toshizō's full confidence and was one of the most faithful members of the Shinsengumi till the very end of his life.

== In popular culture ==
Yamazaki is featured in Peacemaker Kurogane (anime/manga), Gintama (anime/manga), Soshite, Haru no Tsuki, Kaze Hikaru (manga), Getsumei Seiki (manga), Shinsengumi! portrayed by Kichiya Katsura, Bakumatsu Renka Shinsengumi (video game series), Destined to love (otome game), and Hakuouki: Shinsengumi Kitan (anime/otome game). He is also depicted in the 1999 film Gohatto.

Even though the real Yamazaki was not a ninja, his anime, manga, and TV depictions tend to be a well-trained ninja. This includes Han'nya (a character loosely based on Yamazaki) from the manga Rurouni Kenshin. Additionally, the character Yamazaki Sagaru in the manga Gintama is roughly based on Yamazaki. Haruka Takagi, the teacher of Isami from the anime series Soar High! Isami is also loosely based on Yamazaki.

In the 2014 Yakuza series spin-off “Ryu Ga Gotoku Ishin!” Yamazaki is portrayed by the Yakuza character Kugihara Hiroshi, while in the remake he is portrayed by a different Yakuza character, Joon-gi Han.
