= Tōdō Heisuke =

Samurai (1844–1867)

- 藤堂 平助
- Born: Tōdō Heisuke Fujiwara no Yoshitora; 1844; Musashi Province, Edo, Japan
- Died: December 13, 1867 (aged 22–23); Aburanokōji, Kyoto, Japan
- Burial place: Kaikō-ji, Kyoto, Japan
- Military career
- Allegiance: Tokugawa bakufu
- Branch: Rōshigumi (former); Mibu Rōshigumi (former); Shinsengumi (former); Goryō Eji
- Service years: 1863–1867
- Commands: Shinsengumi Eighth Unit
- Conflicts: Ikedaya incident Aburanokōji incident

Tōdō Heisuke (藤堂 平助; 1844 – December 13, 1867) was a samurai of Japan's late Edo period who served as the eighth unit captain of the Shinsengumi. His full name was Tōdō Heisuke Fujiwara no Yoshitora (藤堂 平助 藤原 宜虎).

== Background ==
Tōdō was from Edo, Musashi Province (now Tokyo). Very little is known about his origin. Although he was said to be an illegitimate child of Tōdō Takayuki, the 11th generation lord of the Tsu domain, this is highly debatable. However, one argument some use in favor of this theory is the fact that he possessed a sword made by Kazusa no suke Kaneshige, who was a swordmaker under the patronage of the Tsu domain; and that such a sword would be difficult for a mere rōnin to obtain, even by heritage. Another point that suggests possible Tsu domain heritage is his formal given name 諱 (imina), Yoshitora (宜虎), which shares a character in common with the name of the first Tōdō lord of Tsu, Tōdō Takatora (藤堂高虎).

Tōdō was a practitioner of the Hokushin Ittō-ryū, trained at Chiba Shusaku Narimasa's dojo. However, according to some sources, he was trained at Itō Kashitarō's dojo instead.

In around 1862, he started "taking his meals" at Kondo Isami's Shieikan.

== Shinsengumi period ==
In 1863, Tōdō joined the Rōshigumi with Kondō and other members of the Shieikan. After the Shinsengumi was formed, Tōdō first became a fukuchō jokin (assistant vice commander). Tōdō was the youngest unit captain of Shinsengumi.

Sources vary as to his role in the Serizawa Kamo (one of the original commanders of the Shinsengumi) assassination.

Tōdō received a wound on his forehead during the Ikedaya incident on July 8, 1864. He then became the captain of the eighth unit in 1865.

== Death ==
Tōdō, having joined Itō Kashitarō's breakaway Goryō Eji (御陵衛士) group, left the Shinsengumi. While with the help of six other defectors, attempting to retrieve the body of Itō who was killed earlier, he was killed along with Hattori Takeo and Mônai Arinosuke in an ambush by the Shinsengumi during the Aburanokōji incident in Aburanokōji, Kyoto on December 13, 1867. Their bodies were left there for 3 days before they were buried first in Kōen-ji, Kyoto. Later they were moved and interred in Kaikō-ji, Kyoto.

According to Nagakura Shinpachi's Shinsengumi Tenmatsuki, Kondō had wished to spare Tōdō's life. However, Tōdō was killed by a new member, Miura Tsunesaburō, who did not know the circumstances.
