= Juband =

Juband جوبند
- Village
- Location within Iran
- Coordinates: 38°35′51″N 46°58′24″E
- Country: Iran
- Province: East Azerbaijan
- County: Ahar
- Bakhsh: Central
- Rural District: Owch Hacha

Population (2006)
  - Total: 196
- Time zone: UTC+3:30 (IRST)
  - Summer (DST): UTC+4:30 (IRDT)

Juband (Persian: جوبند, also Romanized as Jūband) is a village in Owch Hacha Rural District, in the Central District of Ahar County, East Azerbaijan Province, Iran. At the 2006 census, its population was 196, in 48 families.
