= Harada Sanosuke =

Japanese samurai

- 原田 左之助
- Born: 1840; Iyo-Matsuyama Domain, Japan
- Died: July 6, 1868 (aged 27–28); Ueno, Edo, Japan
- Spouse: Harada Masa (m. 1865–1868)
- Children: Harada Shigeru (son)
- Military career
- Allegiance: Tokugawa bakufu
- Branch: Rōshigumi (former); Mibu Rōshigumi (former); Shinsengumi (former); Seiheitai (former); Shōgitai
- Service years: 1863–1868
- Conflicts: Ikedaya incident Kinmon Incident; Sanjo Seisatsu incident Aburanokōji incident Boshin War: Battle of Toba–Fushimi; Battle of Kōshū-Katsunuma; Battle of Ueno

Harada Sanosuke (原田 左之助; 1840 – July 6, 1868) was a Japanese warrior (samurai) who lived in the late Edo period. He was the 10th unit captain of the Shinsengumi, and died during the Boshin War.

== Background ==
Harada was born to a family of chūgen, or low-ranking quasi-samurai, who served the retainers of the Iyo-Matsuyama Domain (now the city of Matsuyama). He trained in the spear technique of the Hōzōin-ryū style, and usually used that weapon in battle instead of a sword. During his time in Matsuyama, he was once ridiculed by a Matsuyama retainer as being a peon who was unfamiliar with how to properly commit seppuku. Harada, wishing to prove the man wrong, immediately drew his sword and attempted to commit seppuku; however, the wound was shallow, and he survived. Harada later boasted of his scar to his fellow Shinsengumi men, and the incident of his near-disembowelment is said to be the origin of the family crest he chose, which depicted a horizontal line, the kanji for one, within a circle (maru ni ichimonji (丸に一文字)). Later leaving the Matsuyama domain's service, he went to Edo, and trained at Kondō Isami's Shieikan dōjō.

== Shinsengumi period ==
In 1863, Harada, together with Kondō and others associated with the Shieikan, joined Kiyokawa Hachirō's Rōshigumi and departed for Kyoto. Shortly after reaching Kyoto, the Rōshigumi was disbanded and most of its members returned to Edo. Harada, Kondō, Serizawa Kamo and several others remained behind and formed the core of the group known as Mibu Rōshigumi, which later became the Shinsengumi.

Later, Harada became the Captain of the Shinsengumi tenth Unit. He was trained briefly under a dojo run by Tani Sanjūrō, whom he introduced into the Shinsengumi. In 1865, Tani became the seventh Unit Captain. In Kyoto, Harada married a local woman named Sugawara Masa (菅原まさ), and briefly had a private family residence near the Shinsengumi headquarters at Nishi-Honganji. The couple had a son, whom Harada named Shigeru (茂), taking the second character from the shōgun Iemochi (家茂)'s name. Harada was very trusted by vice-commander Hijikata. He was involved in many of the crucial missions the group faced and was very likely involved in the Serizawa Kamo (original commander of the Shinsengumi) assassination. He was involved in the Uchiyama Hikojirō's assassination, the Ikedaya incident, and the Sanjo Seisatsu incident.

Harada became a hatamoto, together with the rest of Shinsengumi, in June 1867. At one time he was accused (by former Shinsengumi member Itō Kashitarō) as one of the assassins of the Sakamoto Ryōma and Nakaoka Shintarō who were murdered on December 10, 1867. The truth behind the incident remains unclear, but according to the confession of the Tokugawa retainer Imai Nobuo later in 1870, the assassins were men of the Mimawarigumi (another Tokugawa-affiliated unit) under the hatamoto Sasaki Tadasaburō.

Later on December 13, 1867, he, Nagakura Shinpachi and several Shinsengumi members were involved in the ambush of Itō Kashitarō's Goryō Eji Kōdai-ji faction during the Aburanokōji incident.

In January 1868, Harada, together with the rest of the Shinsengumi, fought at the Battle of Toba–Fushimi against the Imperial forces. He and his family subsequently left the Kyoto region for Edo. In March, the Shinsengumi was renamed to Kōyō Chinbutai (甲陽鎮撫隊, Pacification Corps) and advanced on Kai Province, and fought at the Battle of Kōshū-Katsunuma, however, the unit was defeated and forced to retreat back to Edo. In the wake of this defeat, Harada and Nagakura Shinpachi left the Kōyō Chinbutai after disagreements with Kondō and Hijikata. According to Nagakura's version of events, Kondō wanted the surviving men to become his retainers; Nagakura, Harada, and a few others staunchly refused. Nagakura and Harada, taking with them some other Shinsengumi members, joined with a group of former Tokugawa retainers to form a new unit, the Seiheitai. Seiheitai left Edo shortly after Edo Castle's surrender, and headed north, hoping to take part in the fighting that was moving northward, toward Aizu.

== Death ==
After Seiheitai's departure from Edo, Harada, wishing to be with his wife and child, returned to the city. However, he was unable to leave the city, and so he joined the Shōgitai, which also sided with the Tokugawa regime. Harada fought at the Battle of Ueno, where he was severely wounded by enemy gunfire. Two days later on July 6, 1868, he died of his wounds, while at the residence of the hatamoto, Jinbo Yamashiro-no-kami.

There is a rumor that Harada did not die in 1868, but he survived and travelled to China and became a leader for a group of mounted bandits. There were reports that an old Japanese man came to the aid of the Imperial Japanese Army in the First Sino-Japanese War, and claimed to be Harada Sanosuke. This was reported in a newspaper in 1965, but remains unsubstantiated.
