= Ikedaya incident =

1864 violent confrontation between shishi political activists and police in Kyoto, Japan

Coordinates: 35°0′32.2″N 135°46′11.6″E

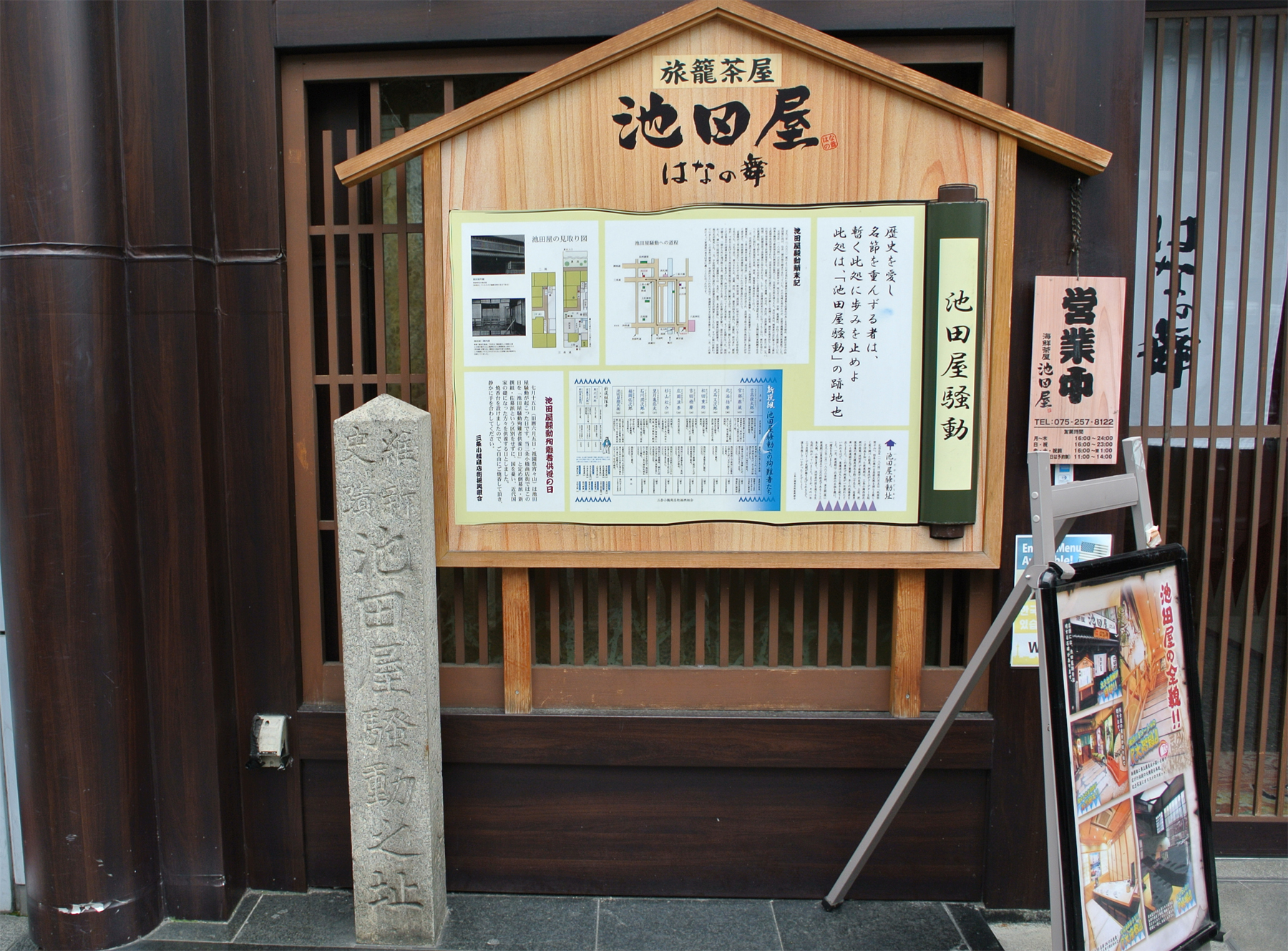
- Ikedaya in April 2010
Date	July 8, 1864
Location	Ikedaya Inn, Kyoto, Japan
Result	Shinsengumi victory

Belligerents
Shinsengumi	Chōshū Domain; Tosa Domain; Higo Domain

Commanders and leaders
Kondō Isami; Hijikata Toshizō	Katsura Kogoro; Miyabe Teizo †; Yoshida Toshimaru †

Strength
34 (10 people; The Kondō group in Ikedaya, 24 people; The Hijikata group in the other.)	40

Casualties and losses
1 killed, 4 injured (of the 4, 2 later died of their injuries)	8 killed, 23 arrested
- Battle ended in 2 hours
- Location within Japan

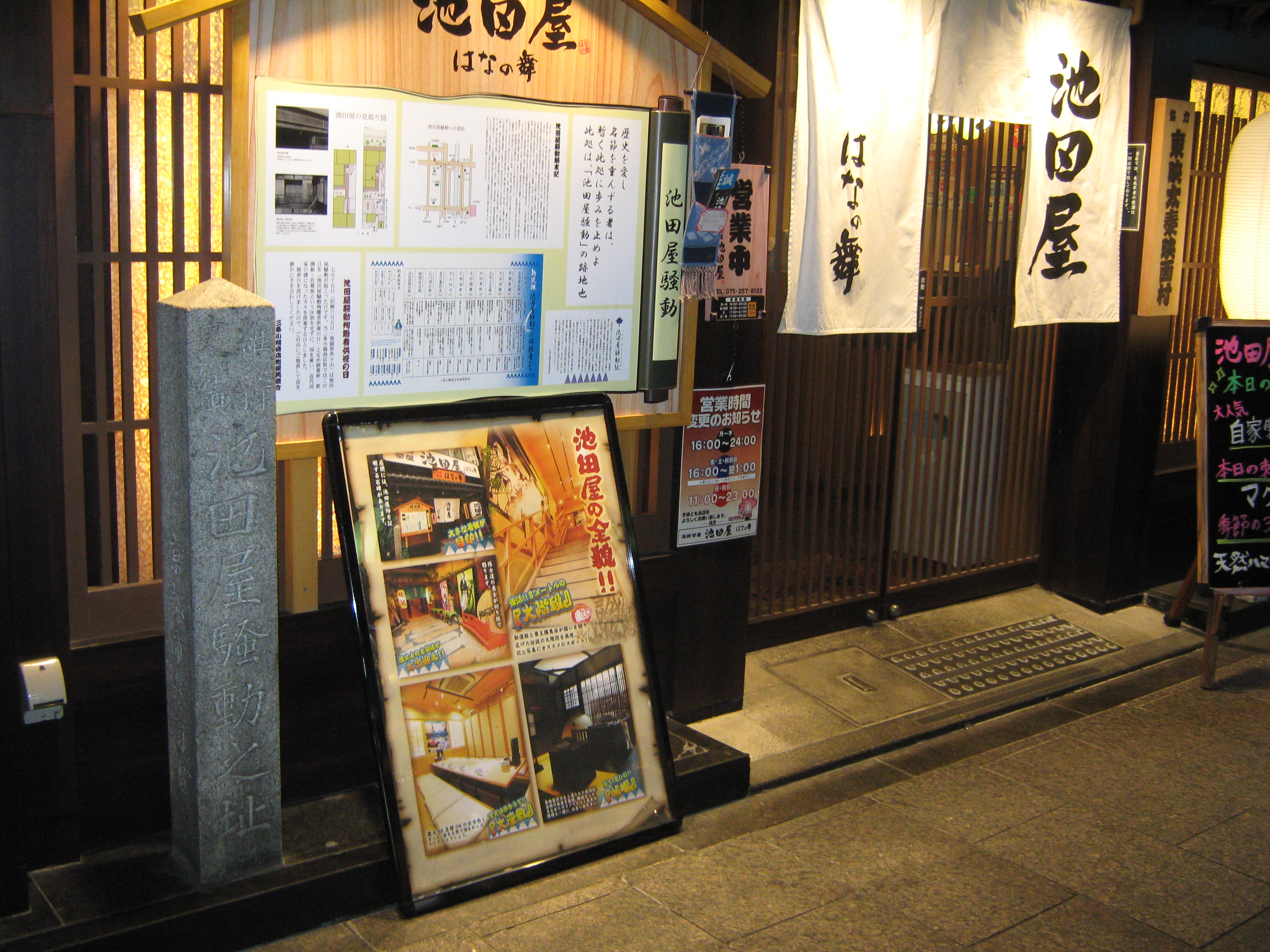
The commemorative plaque standing at the former site of the Ikedaya Inn

The Ikedaya incident (池田屋事件, Ikedaya jiken), also known as the Ikedaya affair or Ikedaya riot, was an armed encounter between the shishi which included masterless samurai (rōnin) formally employed by the Chōshū, Tosa and Higo domains (han), and the Shinsengumi, the Bakufu's special police force in Kyoto on July 8, 1864, at the Ikedaya Inn in Sanjō-Kawaramachi, Kyoto, Japan.

== History ==
At the end of the Edo period, Kyoto attracted unemployed rōnin of varying allegiances. Those from the Chōshū, Tosa and Higo clans were heavily influenced by the sonnō jōi (revere the Emperor, expel the foreign barbarians) philosophy and supported forcibly removing all Western influences from Japan. Emperor Kōmei and the Aizu and Satsuma clans preferred a unification of the bakufu and the imperial court. The bakufu tried to retain their centralized power. In this political chaos, ronin from the various factions began to assassinate each other. The bakufu organized groups of ronin including Shinsengumi and charged them with arresting or killing (should they resist arrest) the sonnō jōi shishi.

The shishi were using the Ikedaya Inn as a staging point for their forces. The Shinsengumi arrested one of the shishi, Furutaka Shuntarō, for being a member of an anti-Shogunate group, triggering the Ikedaya incident. Furutaka had a strong relationship with the Chōshū clans, and wanted to build trust with Mōri, a member of the court, in order to take power. There are some other theories about the cause of Furutaka's arrest. One is that Teshiro Toshisuke resented Furutaka due to a dispute over the inheritance of Masuya, and his report of Furutaka's location to the Shinsengumi led to his capture.

The interrogation carried out by Shinsengumi vice-commander Hijikata Toshizō was alleged to be particularly brutal, although there is no proof of this. With the prisoner unresponsive, Hijikata was said to have suspended him by his ankles, restraining his wrists, and driving five-inch spikes into the heels of his feet. Lit candles were placed in the holes, so that hot wax dripped all over his calves. Furutaka eventually claimed that they planned to set fires in Kyoto and capture Matsudaira Katamori, the daimyō of the Aizu clan whose duties included policing Kyoto at the time.

Another version of the confession claims that Furutaka planned to burn Prince Kuni Asahiko with Kawamura Hanzō and Otaka Matajirō. Also, he revealed that many of the Chōshū retainers were hiding out in the Gion district. The urgency of the situation thus revealed, Kondō Isami led a group of Shinsengumi troops to the inn to arrest the shishi; a second group led by Hijikata arrived shortly thereafter.

Historians are divided as to whether the shishi were actually preparing to set fire to Kyoto. The allegations were based on a confession of one prisoner (Furutaka) under torture, and only appear in the records of the bakufu. Because of the arrest, the Chōshū retainers decided to gather at Ikedaya, and they tried to take countermeasures. Some of them thought they should attack a garrison of Shinsengumi and recapture Furutaka. However, almost everyone agreed to exercise prudence. Yoshida Toshimaro and Miyabe Teizō decided to hold a meeting to convince those who wanted to act immediately and change their minds to act prudently. Katsura Kogorō (later Kido Takayoshi) who was at the Ikedaya claimed many years later that they had only met to discuss how to rescue Furukata from the Shinsengumi.

Whether or not Hijikata actually employed such a cruel interrogation method is also in some doubt, as conflicting reports from those in attendance (such as Nagakura Shinpachi) exist. Some feel that if Hijikata had really tortured Furutaka so severely, he would have passed out and would not have been able to make a statement. Some popular fiction, like the account in Moeyoken (a 1964 novel by Shiba Ryōtarō) seems to ignore Hijikata's potential participation.

=== Combat ===
The incident happened the day before the Gion Festival. Shinsengumi knew about 20 hiding places of shishi, and they started the search of shishi around 7 p.m.

A total of 34 people in the Shinsengumi joined this incident. They were divided into two groups. The Kondō group had 10 people and the Hijikata group had 24 people. Further, Hijikata's group was separated into two groups. It was designed so that they could act flexibly. Tani, Asano, and Takeda watched the front entrance, and Okuzawa, Andō, and Nitta watched the back entrance. According to Kondo, he entered Ikedaya with Okita, Nagakura, Tōdō, and Shūhei. In contrast, Nagakura mentions that Kondō entered with Okita, Nagakura, and Tōdō. There is a viewpoint that their statements were different because Shūhei was an adopted child of Kondō, and Kondō wanted to emphasize the success of his adopted son. The Kondō group noticed that there were guns and spears in the entrance, so they tied them with a rope. In Ikedaya, there were around 20 people from Chōshū clans.

This incident is commonly portrayed as having unfolded in the dark, but in fact parts of the inn were moderately lit. Kondō tried to induce shishi to come down to the 1st floor because there was a light called Hachiken that illuminated 14.5 meters down the hallway. Nagakura got injured on his hand, and his sword was broken, so he robbed the sword of an enemy. Tōdō had difficulty fighting because he was cut in the middle of the forehead and his blood got in his eyes. After a while, Tōdō left from the combat, so Kondō and Nagakura remained in the Ikedaya Inn. Kondō wanted to help Nagakura, but there were many enemies around him, so he could not help. It is commonly believed that more than 20 members of the Hijikata group rushed all at once, but according to Kondō, the members of the Hijikata group arrived at Ikedaya one after another. Kondō wrote that the battle time was about two hours and ended around 12 o'clock.

There are two theories of Katsura Kogorō regarding where he was or what he did at the time of the incident. One is that he was in Ikedaya when the incident happened. However, he immediately escaped by running down the roof and he entered the Tsushima mansion, so he survived. The second theory is that before the incident happened, he went to Ikedaya, but found that nobody was there. So, he left Ikedaya thinking to come back later. He was staying in the Tsushima mansion when the incident happened.

Sugiyama Matsusuke who was in the Chōshū mansion, worried about Katsura when he heard about the incident, and he tried to go to Ikedaya. However, he encountered with enemies on the way to Ikedaya, and he was seriously injured on his arm, and he came back to the Chōshū mansion.

More than half of the shishi escaped from the back entrance, and people who were killed inside of Ikedaya were Miyabe Teizō, Ōtaka Matajirō, Yoshida Toshimaro and Fukuoka Yūjirō. Miyabe continued fighting, but he committed harakiri in the end. Yoshida committed suicide in front of the entrance of the Chōshū mansion. On the other hand, there is the theory that Yoshida was killed in front of a liquor store near the Kaga mansion.

=== Aftermath ===
After the incident, the area around Ikedaya was crowded. Many messengers from lords went to visit the Chōshū mansion to nurse injured people back to health. The next morning, the house of Sakamoto Ryōma was attacked. Shinsengumi continued hunting surviving warriors with the Aizu clan. They stayed up all night hunting, and they came back to a garrison at noon, their clothes smeared with blood. A total of eight shishi were killed and twenty-three arrested, Ikedaya Sôbe's family and relatives were also arrested. The Shinsengumi lost only one member in the battle, though two more members later died of injuries. Amongst those injured in the battle were Nagakura Shinpachi and Tōdō Heisuke. It was also said that the later captain of the first Shinsengumi unit Okita Sōji coughed up blood and collapsed during the affair (the cause of which is disputed among researchers, some believe it was due to the tuberculosis which eventually killed him, while others believe it was some other ailment). Okita, Tōdō, and Nagakura recovered in a few days.

Sôbe was arrested because he tried to escape captured shishi by unwinding the rope. The Shinsengumi thought that Sôbe supported Chōshū clans. In prison, he could not bear the torture, and he died on July 13. Dead were sent to the Sanryokuji Temple. A few days later, the maid of Ikedaya was asked to examine the dead bodies and identify them. Furutaka thought the incident happened because of his testimony, so he spent his life with a depressing feeling. Katsura did not go back to the Chōshū mansion after the incident. He believed that the incident happened because some people from Chōshū clans revealed a secret meeting in Ikedaya to the shogunate. He was afraid that his secret would be revealed by some people from Chōshū clans.

This incident made it clear to all that the Shinsengumi were a powerful force in Kyoto to be feared by the sonnō jōi rōnin. Also, the incident proved the ability to collect information, the detective ability, and the combat ability of Shinsengumi. Aizu clans praised Shinsengumi, and they gave around 500 ryō, and the imperial court gave about 100 ryō to Shinsengumi. Since the incident happened, people from Chōshū clans tended to be arrested without investigation of Shinsengumi. According to Nomi, Shinsengumi arrested even though elderly people were from Kii province and did not know about politics and circumstance.

Some historians credit this incident with delaying the eventual Meiji victory by a year or two, whereas others claim it actually hastened the fall of the bakufu by triggering a cascade of bloody retaliations and assassinations. After the Ikedaya incident, the samurai of the Choshu clan retaliated at the Hamaguri Gate of the Imperial Palace on July 19 in the Kinmon incident. Furukata himself was later killed in jail during that incident. The Shogunate followed up with an armed expedition in September 1864.

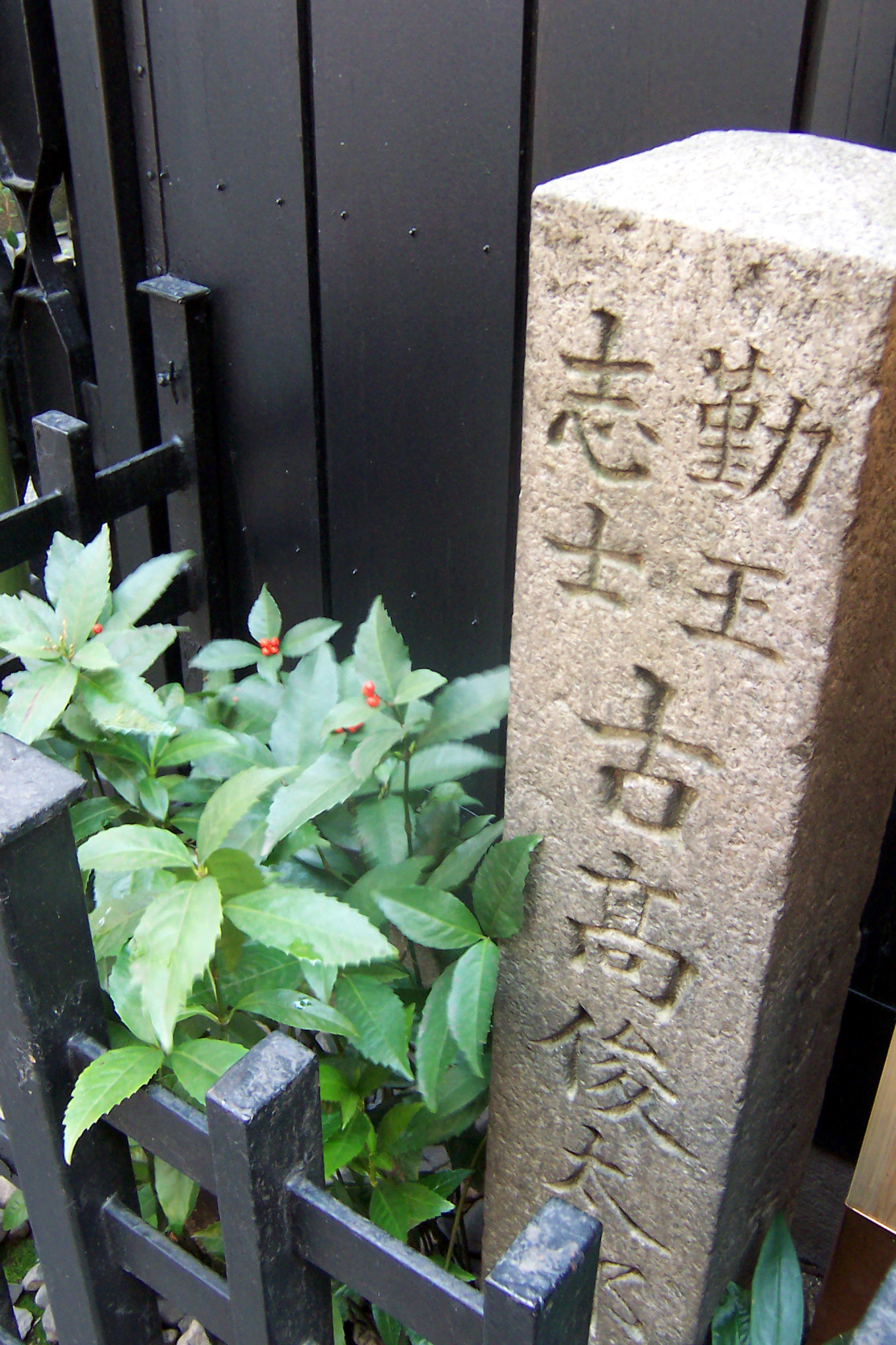
This stone marker stele next to the site of the Ikedaya is engraved with the name of Furutaka Shuntarō, a man tortured by Hijikata Toshizō of the Shinsengumi and the one who gave the information necessary for them to start the famous Ikedaya incident.

As for the Ikedaya itself, the inn stopped operating for seven months, after which the inn resumed under one of the owner's relatives, but later went out of business. The Ikedaya Inn was later taken over by the new owner.

== Present ==
In 1960, the inn was torn down and a two story commercial building was built on its former site. For many years a pachinko parlor sat on the grounds of the Ikedaya, with the only remnant being a stone memorial tablet relating the events that occurred on the site.

In 2009, Chimney Group opened a restaurant named Ikedaya Hana no Mai on the site, designed and decorated with an Ikeda-ya Shinsengumi/Bakumatsu theme including extensive exhibits and dioramas.

== Member list of Shinsengumi ==
The Kondō group (10 people)

- Kondō Isami
- Okita Sōji
- Nagakura Shinpachi
- Tōdō Heisuke
- Tani Mantarō
- Asano Tōtarō
- Takeda Kanryūsai
- Okuzawa Eisuke
- Andō Hayatarō
- Nitta Kakuzaemon

The Hijikata group (24 people)

- Hijikata Toshizō
- Inoue Genzaburō
- Harada Sanosuke
- Saitō Hajime
- Sasazuka Minezō
- Hayashi Shintarō
- Shimada Kai
- Kawashima Katsuji
- Katsurayama Takehachirō
- Tani Sanjūrō
- Mishina Chūji
- Aridōshi Kango
- Matsubara Chūji
- Iki Hachirō
- Nakamura Kingo
- Ozeki Yashirō
- Shukuin Ryozō
- Sasaki Kuranosuke
- Kawai Kisaburō
- Sakai Hyōgo
- Kiuchi Mineta
- Matsumoto Kijirō
- Takeuchi Gentarō
- Kōndō Shūhei
