= Serizawa Kamo =

Samurai (1826–1863)

- 芹沢 鴨
- Born: Serizawa Kamo Taira no Mitsumoto; September 2, 1826; Mito, Ibaraki Prefecture, Japan
- Died: October 30, 1863 (aged 37); Yagi Residence, Mibu, Kyoto, Kyoto Prefecture, Japan
- Burial place: Mibu-dera, Kyoto Prefecture, Kyoto, Japan
- Other names: Shimomura Tsuguji; Serizawa Mitsumoto; Kimura Keiji
- Spouse: Kimura Umeko
- Military career
- Allegiance: Tokugawa bakufu
- Branch: Rōshigumi (former); Mibu Rōshigumi (former); Shinsengumi
- Commands: Mibu Rōshigumi (former); Shinsengumi

Serizawa Kamo (芹沢 鴨; September 2, 1826 – October 30, 1863) was a samurai known for being the original lead commander of the Shinsengumi. He trained in and received a licence in the Shindō Munen-ryū. "Kamo" means goose or duck in Japanese which was an odd name to call oneself at the time. His full name was Serizawa Kamo Taira no Mitsumoto.

== Background ==
The Serizawa family were upper-seat Goshi rank samurai in Serizawa village in Mito which is now the capital of Ibaraki Prefecture in Japan. Kamo was born as the youngest son and his childhood name was Genta. He had two older brothers and an older sister. He was educated with the Sonnō jōi ideals (meaning revere the Tenno (emperor) and expel the foreigners) and swordsmanship since childhood at Kodoukan which was a state school in Mito. Mito is a sub-branch of the Tokugawa family and it was considered the motherland of the Sonnō Jōi ideology and was a center of support for the Tennō and the Imperial court, which helped fuel the Revolution.

Although no portrait of Kamo remains, it is said he was a large man with very pale skin and small eyes.

On one hand, Serizawa was quite bold and fearless and on the other hand, he was extremely selfish and had a short temper so he started fights often. If he was in a bad mood he would often get violent, especially when he was drinking, and he was a heavy drinker. He was an idealist who held very strong pro-Imperial court beliefs and took the Sonno-joi beliefs very seriously while at the same time siding with the Tokugawa regime. A lesser well-known fact is that Serizawa was good at drawing and showed his drawings to children.

== Tenguto Period ==
Kamo was the priest for a Shinto temple under the Kimura family. He married the daughter of the Kimura family, so his name was changed to Kimura Keiji. In 1860, he took part in an extremist anti-foreigner group "Tengu-to" (alternative name is Tamazukurisei) which assassinated Tairo Ii Naosuke. He made a name for himself as he joined the higher ranks of the group. What is little known that he was originally supposed to participate in the famous Tairo assassination, but he was not able to make it in time. In early 1861, he found out that three of the younger members in the group had broken the rules, causing him to lose his temper; he made them sit in a line and beheaded them all at once. He was jailed within the Tengu-to group for executing them without any permission. When political power shifted to the pro-Tokugawa government, those in the Tengu-to were jailed for their involvement on the assassination of Ii. There, he wrote this famous poem written on his ripped piece of clothing with his own blood from biting his pinky finger:

｢雪霜 に 色 よく 花 の 魁て 散り ても 後に 匂ほう 梅が 香｣

Yukishimo ni
Iroyoku hana no
Sakigakete
Chiritemo nochi ni
Nihou ume ga ka

This roughly translates as:

In the snow and frost,
The color remains,
And still giving off its scent after the scattering of the petals;
Such ume is the perfume.

Many were surprised at Kamo's never-before-demonstrated poetic talent. Serizawa was released in late 1862 when the government started to weaken and political power shifted back to the anti-foreigners. Then, he changed his name from Kimura Keiji to "Serizawa Kamo" after his release. He later joined Kiyokawa Hachirou's Roushigumi.

== Mibu Roushigumi/Shinsengumi period ==
After their arrival in Kyoto, Serizawa and Kondō Isami's group separated from the Roushigumi, becoming an independent group. A few weeks later, Serizawa and Kondō decided to submit a letter to the Aizu clan asking to join them in policing Kyoto. The Aizu clan were assigned by the Tokugawa regime to police the streets in Kyoto by samurai (most of them lower-class samurai from Chōshū, Tosa, and other states) who rampantly started fights and committed assassinations. The idea of working under the Aizu may have originated with Serizawa's older brother, who had connections with the Aizu clan. The Aizu clan accepted the letter's request, making the twenty-two samurai into a group under the Aizu clan.

It was then that the group began calling themselves the Mibu Roushigumi and Serizawa becomes joint captain of the group with Kondō.

However, Serizawa started numerous incidents. On July 18 (lunar calendar June 3), Aizu commanded Mibu Roushigumi members to police Osaka. Serizawa and his group were out drinking and later Serizawa got in a fight with a sumo wrestler. This created a conflict with the 25–30 wrestlers in the same dojo. Serizawa's group had only ten or so members but managed to overcome their attackers. At the end ten wrestlers were dead and the rest had sustained serious injuries, yet Serizawa's group barely had any injuries at all. News of this incident spread quickly, adding to the Mibu Roushigumi's notoriety. Later in June, Serizawa had a drinking gathering with his members in a restaurant in Shimabara. He lost his temper while drinking and wrecked the whole restaurant; the restaurant had to be closed for business because of it. On September 25 (lunar calendar August 13), Serizawa and his group destroyed Yamatoya, a silk cloth store, in daylight with a cannon given to the group by the Aizu clan when they would not give them money.

== Death ==
On October 19 (lunar calendar September 10), Niimi Nishiki, who was a sub-captain of the Shinsengumi, was ordered to commit seppuku by Hijikata and Yamanami. Most likely, this was the beginning of the plan by the Kondō faction to expel Serizawa and his allies. When Serizawa, Hirayama, and Hirama found out about the involuntary seppuku, they were unable to retaliate because in August they had started recruiting many of their members to side with Kondō. Noguchi Kenji, who was a fukuchou jokin and a member of Serizawa's group, was not in Mibu village at this time of the assassination. But there is a possibility that Niimi was forced to commit seppuku by a Mito samurai for the murder of a Mibu Roushigumi member and Kondō's group was not involved with his death. Therefore, Serizawa's group may have not known about Kondō's assassination plans.

On October 30 (lunar calendar September 18; however there is debate that it could have happened 2 days earlier in October 28), all of the Shinsengumi had a drinking party at which was a plan to assassinate Serizawa. The selected few led by Hijikata went into the house of Yagi Gennojō that night, Serizawa was then assassinated along with Oume, a woman who was sleeping with him, and also Hirayama. Hirama, the sole survivor in Serizawa's group, managed to flee back to Mito where he reported Serizawa Kamo's death to his family. The assassination was carried out under Matsudaira Katamori's order. Three months later, on February 4, 1864 (lunar calendar December 27, 1863), Noguchi was ordered to commit seppuku by the Shinsengumi.

=== Assassination ===
There is some debate about who exactly was involved with killing Serizawa. Obviously those chosen to take part in the plot would have been members that Kondo and Hijikata trusted and also able to keep it a secret. The lineup was most likely Hijikata, Okita, Yamanami Keisuke, Inoue, and Harada. There is an alternative theory that the assassination was done by Hijikata, Tōdō, Saitō and Harada. It is highly unlikely that Kondō himself was involved with the assassination because it would have been too risky to get the next lead captain injured or killed.

There have been a number of theories about the motive for the assassination:

- Serizawa was too out of hand, so Aizu secretly planned to assassinate Serizawa Kamo with Kondō and Hijikata.

This is the most mainstream and widely-believed theory. It's quite possible that both Aizu and Kondō felt Serizawa was too reckless to be the lead captain of a group that was intended to regulate peace in Kyoto, and one who would react violently to dismissal.

- The Mito clan was thinking of taking Serizawa's Mibu Roushigumi to the fore-runner of sonno joi. Aizu clan felt this was a threat because they are more pro-Tokugawa than pro-Imperial court like Mito, so they commanded Kondo to assassinate Serizawa's group.

This is a lesser-known theory. The Aizu clan could have commanded Kondō to assassinate Serizawa because he was reckless in order to hide the true motive; an underlying political conflict with Mito. Aizu was having trouble in Kyoto already from samurais from Chōshū and Tosa causing violence openly in the streets, so they could have wanted to prevent Mito samurais from entering the blood bath of Kyoto. Then, extreme samurais from 3 states (Mito, Chōshū and Tosa) were competing with each other carrying out terrorist actions against those who they believed were against anti-foreigner ideals. A Mito official in Kyoto could have been plotting to take Serizawa's group and make them side with Mito.

- Kondo and Hijikata used Serizawa to have connections with Aizu and now that was accomplished they eliminated Serizawa's group to take a hold of the group.

It's likely that Kondo and Hijikata hated Serizawa in the first place. But, they probably wouldn't have been able to form Mibu Roushigumi, which later became the Shinsengumi, if it wasn't for Serizawa's brother's close relations with the Aizu clan; they allowed him to be lead captain because they were just using him to get connections with Aizu. When they felt they securely had the trust to Aizu they assassinated Serizawa because they no longer needed him. It is possible that they also kept the assassination in the dark from the Aizu clan since they have reported Serizawa's cause of death from illness.

=== Grave ===
Kondō's group held a funeral for his death and Serizawa's older brother came to it. His grave was built a year after his death in Mibu Temple and it still resides there today.

There is a quote about him from Nagakura Shinpachi:

"◎新選組顛末記-永倉 新八 猛烈な勤皇思想を抱き、つねに攘夷を叫んでいた。 大勢からは先生と呼ばれていた。 それほどの才幹で、国家有事の時にむざむざと横死したことは、彼自身のみならず、国家的損害であるとは、当時、心あるものの一致するところであった。"

which roughly translates as:

"He held extremely strong pro-Imperial court ideals and screamed for the expelling out of foreigners. Everyone called him sensei. He was that much of a man but he died when the country needed him. We felt this is not just a loss for him but a loss for the country".

== In popular culture ==
Serizawa is featured in Shiba Ryotaro's Moeyo Ken (Burn, O Sword) and Shinsengumi Keppuroku (Record of Shinsengumi Bloodshed).

He is also featured in the manga Kaze Hikaru as Commander Serizawa and is pictured as a jolly man, often red nosed from drunkenness but below his comic and often-perverted nature is also a fierce opponent who should not be underestimated. He is often seen on drinking fests with the rest of the Mibu clan or always trying to get a kiss from Kamiya Seizaburo (Tominaga Sei). He falls in love in with a woman named Oume. His fight with Sumo wrestlers and meeting Oume are historical facts based on the real-life story of Serizawa.

Serizawa's assassination was portrayed in the anime version of Peacemaker Kurogane

Serizawa is featured in NHK Shinsengumi portrayed by Kōichi Satō, as a powerful swordsman, with a short temper, yet he had a strong spirit, and a great love for his country. Four Shinsengumi members were sent to assassinate him: Hijikata, Okita, Harada, and Sannan. Okita foolishly swung his Katana and it got stuck on the lintel off a doorway. Serizawa broke Hijikata's sword in two then slipped on his own bottle of sake. Okita stabbed him through the heart with his Kodachi, and Hijikata finished him off by stabbing him in the back.

In Rurouni Kenshin the character Shishio Makoto is roughly based on Serizawa Kamo as said by the manga artist Nobuhiro Watsuki, creator of Rurouni Kenshin series, during an interview (contained in Kenshin Kaden).

Also included as a character in Hakuouki Reimeiroku, Serizawa plays a major role in the most recent series of the anime Hakuōki.

In the 2014 game Ryū ga Gotoku Ishin!, Serizawa Kamo kills Miburoshigumi captain Inōe Genzaburo, and takes on the dead man's identity at the behest of leader Kondō Isami. He says that three of the existing captains must take on the role of the dead Mito faction members in order to keep the group alive, which he then renames the Shinsengumi.

Serizawa Kamo appeared in the 2024 drama "With You I Bloom: The Shinsengumi Youth Chronicle" based on the 1963 Shinsengumi manga by Osamu Tezuka. He was portrayed by Ryosuke Miura.

== Sources ==
- The Man who created the Shinsengumi "Serizawa Kamo". In Japanese.
