= Niimi Nishiki =

Member of the Tokugawa-era special police force Shinsengumi

Niimi Nishiki (新見 錦; c. 1836 – October 25, 1863) was born in Mito-han (now Ibaraki Prefecture). He was a master of the Shintomunen-ryu swordsmanship style. He was one of the original thirteen members of the Shinsengumi, together with Serizawa Kamo and Kondō Isami.

== Name ==
Although he took the name Niimi Nishiki, his real name remains obscure. Scholars have speculated that his real name may have been Niinomi Kumetarō (Japanese: 新家粂太郎). He is assumed to have been well educated, because the name Niimi Nishiki shows a play of pronunciation.

== Shinsengumi ==
Nishiki was originally one of the three commanders with Kondo and Serizawa but later he had his rank lowered to vice-commander.

There are speculations that he could have been a spy for the Chōshū Domain and that he also had close connections with Sonnō jōi groups in Mito and Tosa Province.

== Death ==
Being an important member of the Serizawa faction, Nishiki was later forced by Yamanami Keisuke and Hijikata Toshizō to commit seppuku around October 19 (by the lunar calendar, the 10th day of the ninth month), 1863. Serizawa and the other members of his group were assassinated about a week later by order of Matsudaira Katamori, the daimyō of the Aizu clan.
