= Itō Kashitarō =

Japanese samurai (1835–1867)

Itō Kashitarō (伊東 甲子太郎; 1835 – 1867) was a staff of the Shinsengumi during the late Edo period, a literary instructor, and the leader of the Goryo Eshi.

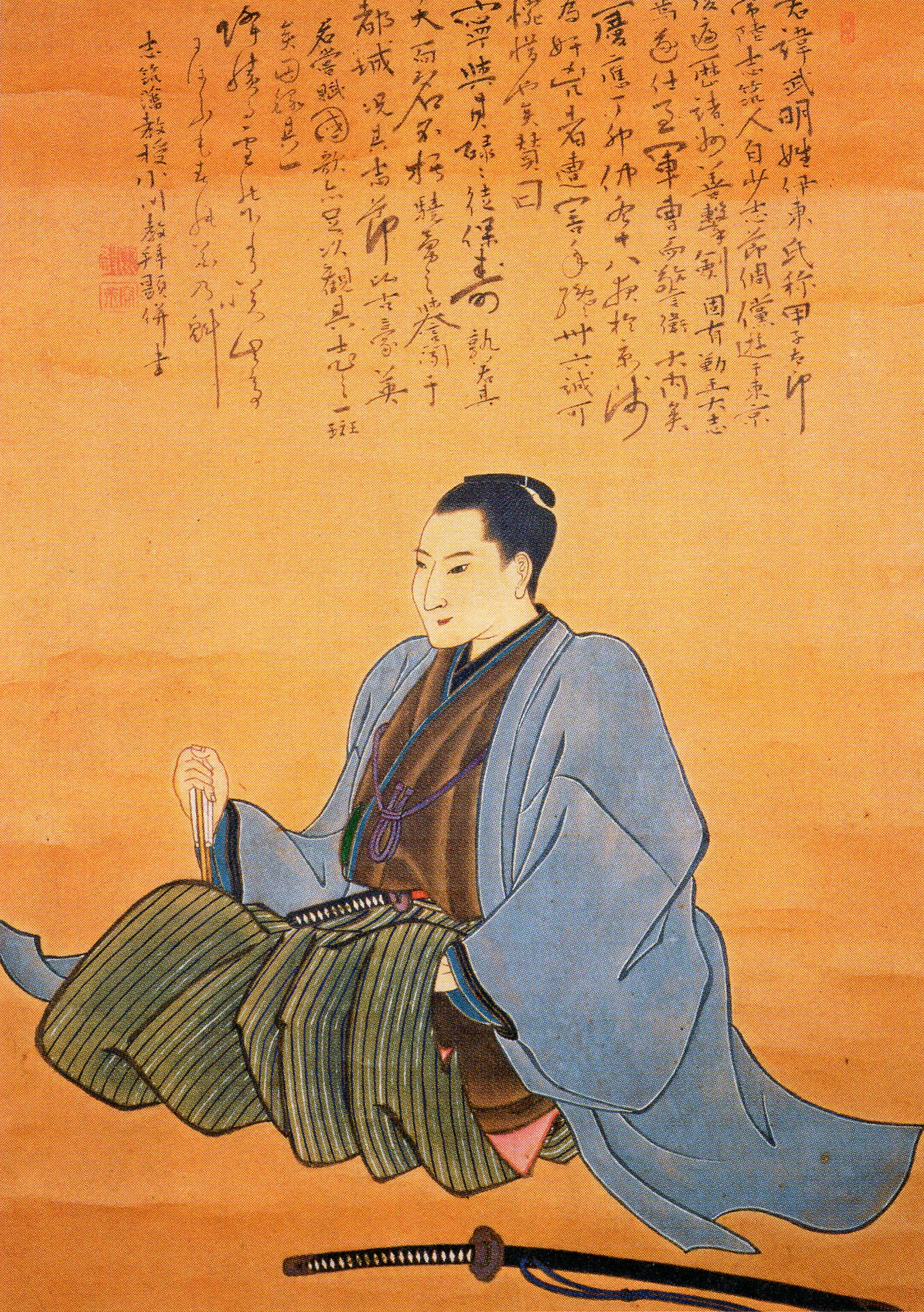
Itō Kashitarō
