= Battle of Kōshū-Katsunuma =

1868 Engagement of the Boshin War

- Part of Boshin War
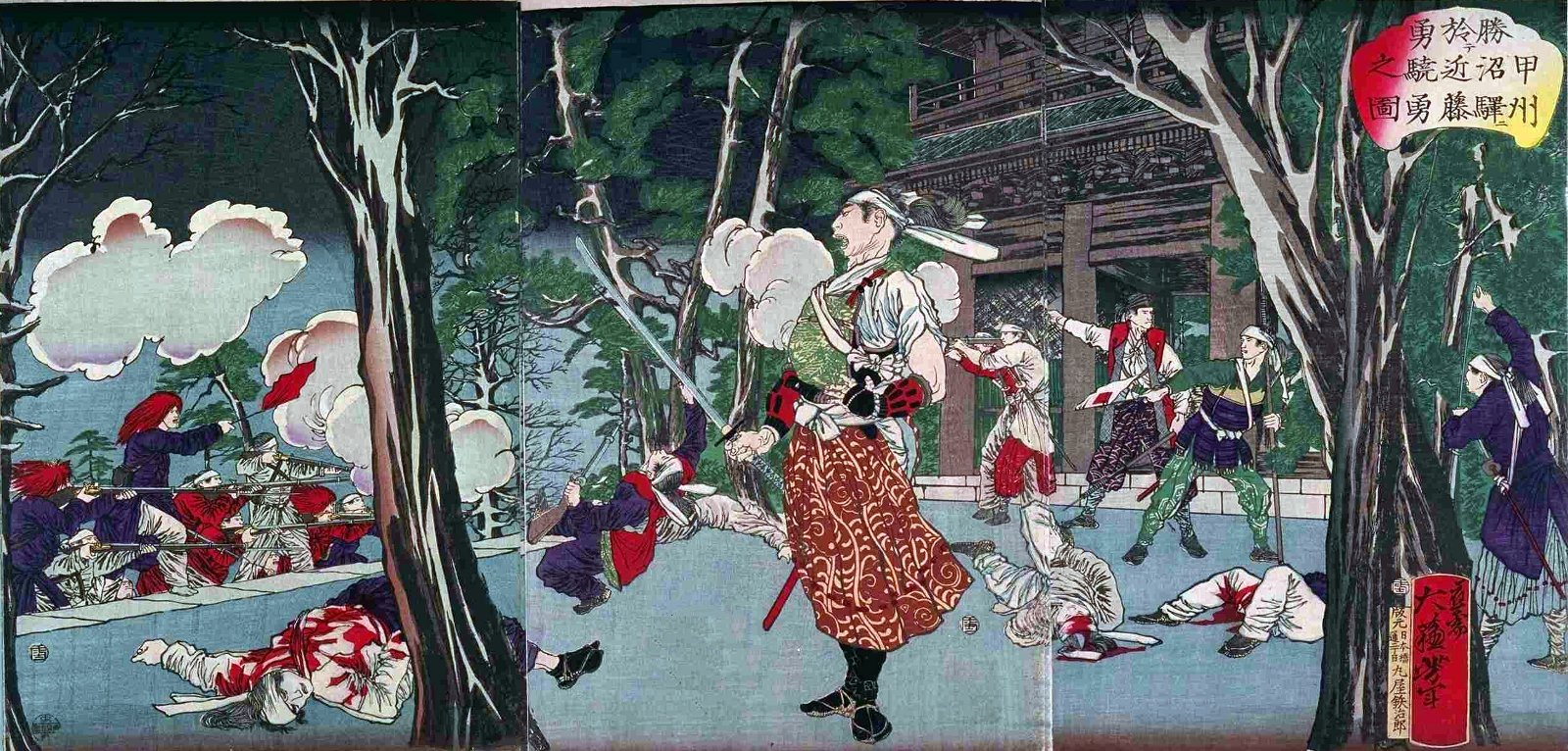
- Kondō Isami at the Battle of Kōshū-Katsunuma
Date	29 March 1868
Location	Katsunuma, Yamanashi
Result	Imperial victory

Belligerents
Satsuma; Chōshū; Tosa	Bakufu; Shinsengumi

Commanders and leaders
Itagaki Taisuke; Ijichi Masaharu; Kawata Kagetomo	Kondō Isami; Hijikata Toshizō

Strength
3,000 Imperial combatants & members of the Jinshōtai	300 Shogunate combatants

Casualties and losses
103	179

The Battle of Kōshū-Katsunuma (甲州勝沼の戦い, Kōshū-Katsunuma no tatakai) took place between pro-Imperial and Tokugawa shogunate forces during the Boshin War in Japan. The battle followed the Battle of Toba–Fushimi on 29 March 1868 (Gregorian calendar).

== Prelude ==
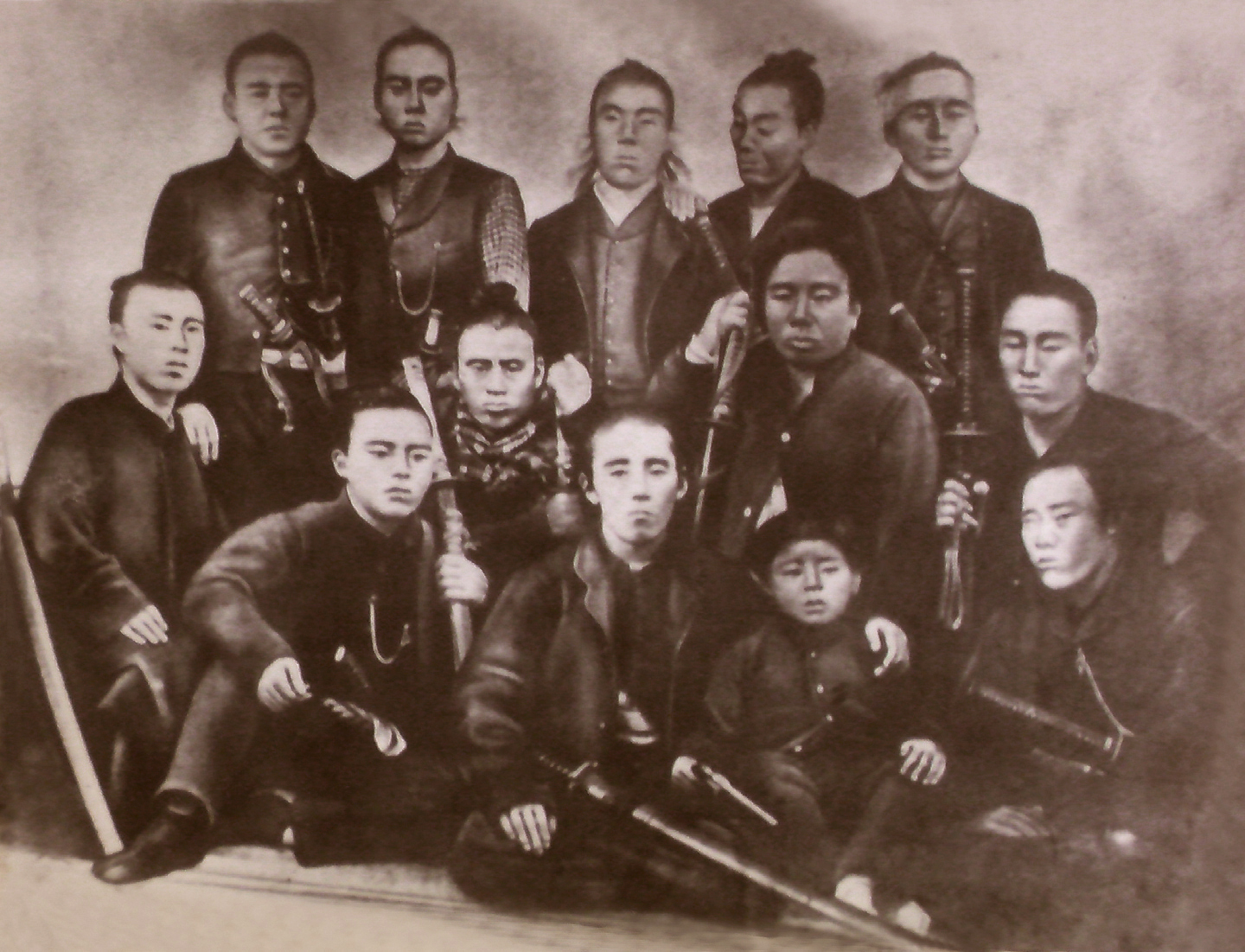
Tosa Jinshōtai (From the left in the bottom row: Ban Gondayu, Itagaki Taisuke, Tani Otoi (young boy), Yamachi Motoharu. From the left in the middle row: Tani Shigeki (Shinbei), Tani Tateki (Moribe), Yamada Kiyokado (Heizaemon), Yoshimoto Sukekatsu( Heinosuke). From the left in the top row: Kataoka Masumitsu (Kenkichi), Manabe Masayoshi (Kaisaku), Nishiyama Sakae, Kitamura Shigeyori (Chōbei), Beppu Hikokuro)

After defeating the forces of the Tokugawa shogunate at the Battle of Toba–Fushimi, the Imperial forces (consisting of the feudal armies of Chōshū, Satsuma and Tosa domains) split into three columns, which progressed northeast towards the Tokugawa capital of Edo up each of the three main highways: Tōkaidō (road), Nakasendō and Hokurikudō.

Meanwhile, Kondō Isami, leader of the Shinsengumi, withdrew to Edo after the Battle of Toba–Fushimi. Once back in Edo, he met with Shogunal military commander Katsu Kaishū. Kondō created a new unit based on the surviving remnants of the Shinsengumi, called the Kōyō Chinbutai (甲陽鎮撫隊, Pacification Corps), and they departed Edo on 24 March.

== The battle ==
The Imperial army reached the Tokugawa stronghold of Kōfu first, and occupied it with a struggle. The Imperial army then met the Shogunal forces in battle at Katsunuma (now a part of Kōshū, Yamanashi) on 29 March. Outnumbered 10:1, the Shogunal forces were defeated with 179 casualties. The survivors, including Kondō, attempted to flee to Aizu via Sagami Province, which was still controlled by Tokugawa hatamoto loyalists.

== Consequences ==
Kondō Isami narrowly escaped from this battle, but was captured soon after at Nagareyama, Chiba. He was beheaded by the new government at Itabashi a short time later. The Battle of Kōshū-Katsunuma was the last significant military action in central Honshū during the Boshin War, and the death of Kondō Isami further demoralized Tokugawa supporters, contributing to the surrender of Edo Castle without bloodshed later that year.
