= List of best-selling light novels =

A light novel (ライトノベル, raito noberu) is a type of popular literature novel from Japan usually classified as young adult fiction, generally targeting teens or older. The abbreviation of "raito noberu" is ranobe (ラノベ) or, in English, LN. The average length of a light novel is about 50,000 words.

The following is a list of the best-selling Japanese light novel series to date in terms of the number of collected volumes sold. All series in this list have at least 5 million copies in circulation. This list is limited to Japanese lightnovels only. The series are listed according to the highest sales or circulation (copies in print) estimate of their collected volumes as reported in reliable sources unless indicated otherwise. Ties are arranged in alphabetical order.

== Collected volumes ==
=== At least 10 million copies and above ===
Name	Author	Publisher	No. of collected volumes	Date serialized	Approximate sales
That Time I Got Reincarnated as a Slime	Fuse	Micro Magazine	23	2013–2015 (web novel); 2014–2025 (light novel)	62+ million (includes physical and digital sales as well as related books and manga adaptations)
The Apothecary Diaries	Hyūganatsu	Shufunotomo	16	2011–present (web novel); 2014–present (light novel)	57 million (includes manga adaptations)
A Certain Magical Index	Kazuma Kamachi	ASCII Media Works	51	2004–2010 (first story); 2011–2019 (second story: New testament); 2020–present (third story: Genesis testament)	40 million (including spin-offs and manga adaptations)
Guin Saga	Kaoru Kurimoto, Yu Godai	Hayakawa Publishing	149	1979–2024	33 million
Sword Art Online	Reki Kawahara	ASCII Media Works	29	2002–2008 (web novel); 2009–present (light novel)	30 million (including spin-offs)
The Irregular at Magic High School	Tsutomu Satō	ASCII Media Works	32	2008–2011 (web novel); 2011–2020 (light novel); 2020–present (sequel light novel); 2021–present (spin-off light novel)	30 million(including spin-offs and manga adaptations)
Slayers	Hajime Kanzaka	Fujimi Shobo	17	1989–present	22 million(including spin-offs and manga adaptations)
Haruhi Suzumiya	Nagaru Tanigawa	Kadokawa Shoten	13	2003–present	20 million (includes manga adaptation)
Is It Wrong to Try to Pick Up Girls in a Dungeon?	Fujino Ōmori	SB Creative	21	2013–present	20 million (including spin-offs and manga adaptations)
Mushoku Tensei	Rifujin na Magonote	Media Factory	26	2012–2015 (web novel); 2013–2016 (spin-off web novel); 2014–2022 (light novel); 2023–present (spin-off light novel)	18 million (includes physical and digital sales as well as related books and manga adaptations)
Re:Zero − Starting Life in Another World	Tappei Nagatsuki	Media Factory	45	2012–present (web novel); 2014–present (light novel); 2015–present (spin-off light novel)	16 million (includes physical and digital editions as well as related books and manga adaptations)
Ascendance of a Bookworm	Miya Kazuki	TO Books	33	2013–2017 (web novel); 2015–2023 (light novel); 2017–present (spin-off web novel); 2024–present (spin-off light novel)	15 million
Kagerou Project	Shizen no Teki-P	Enterbrain	8	2012–2017	15 million (includes manga adaptation)
My Youth Romantic Comedy Is Wrong, As I Expected	Wataru Watari	Shogakukan	14	2011–2021	15 million
Overlord	Kugane Maruyama	Enterbrain	16	2010–2012 (web novel); 2012–present (light novel)	14 million (including spin-offs and manga adaptations)
Sorcerous Stabber Orphen	Yoshinobu Akita	Fujimi Shobo	20	1994–2003	14 million (including spin-offs and manga adaptations)
The Rising of the Shield Hero	Aneko Yusagi	Media Factory	22	2012–present (web novel); 2013–present (light novel)	13 million (including manga adaptation)
The Twelve Kingdoms	Fuyumi Ono	Kodansha	9	1992–present	12 million
Full Metal Panic!	Shoji Gatoh	Fujimi Shobo	23	1998–2011	11.5 million (including manga adaptations)
Classroom of the Elite	Shōgo Kinugasa	Media Factory	31	2015–present	10.8 million
Campfire Cooking in Another World with My Absurd Skill	Ren Eguchi	Overlap	17	2016–present (web novel); 2016–present (light novel)	10 million (includes physical and digital editions)
Fortune Quest	Mishio Fukazawa	Kadokawa Shoten	48	1989–2020	10 million
Goblin Slayer	Kumo Kagyu	SB Creative	16	2016–present	10 million
KonoSuba	Natsume Akatsuki	Kadokawa Shoten	17	2012–2013 (web novel); 2013–2020 (light novel)	10 million
Record of Lodoss War	Ryo Mizuno	Kadokawa Shoten	7	1988–1993	10 million

=== At least 5 million and below 10 million copies ===
Name	Author	Publisher	No. of collected volumes	Date serialized	Approximate sales
The Saga of Tanya the Evil	Carlo Zen	Enterbrain	14	2010–2012 (web novel); 2013–present (light novel)	9.5 million
Date A Live	Kōshi Tachibana	Fujimi Shobo	22	2011–2020	9 million
My Happy Marriage	Akumi Agitogi	Fujimi Shobo	10	2019–present	9 million (including manga adaptation)
Aria the Scarlet Ammo	Chūgaku Akamatsu	Media Factory	45	2008–present	9 million
Kyūketsuki wa Otoshigoro	Jirō Akagawa	Shueisha	42	1981–present	8.81 million
Shakugan no Shana	Yashichiro Takahashi	ASCII Media Works	28	2002–2012	8.6 million
The Case Files of Biblia Bookstore	En Minami	Kadokawa	12	2011–present	8.5 million
Wise Man's Grandchild	Tsuyoshi Yoshioka	Enterbrain	17	2015–2022 (web novel); 2015–2022 (light novel)	8.3 million
Kino's Journey	Keiichi Sigsawa	ASCII Media Works	24	2000–present	8.2 million
Death March to the Parallel World Rhapsody	Hiro Ainana	Fujimi Shobo	36	2013–present (web novel); 2014–present (light novel)	8 million (including manga adaptation)
My Isekai Life	Shinkoshoto	SB Creative	19	2017–2020 (web novel); 2018–present (light novel)	8 million (including manga adaptation)
Nante Suteki ni Japanesque	Saeko Himuro	Shueisha	10	1984–1991	8 million
I Was Reincarnated as the 7th Prince so I Can Take My Time Perfecting My Magical Ability	Kenkyo na Circle	Kodansha	11	2019–present (web novel); 2020–present (light novel)	8 million (including manga adaptation)
From Old Country Bumpkin to Master Swordsman	Shigeru Sagazaki	Square Enix	11	2020–present (web novel); 2021–present (light novel)	8 million (including manga adaptations)
The Eminence in Shadow	Daisuke Aizawa	Enterbrain	7	2018–present (web novel); 2018–present (light novel)	8 million
High School DxD	Ichiei Ishibumi	Fujimi Shobo	25	2008–2018	7.8 million
Baka and Test	Kenji Inoue	Enterbrain	18	2007–2015	7.3 million
Gate	Takumi Yanai	AlphaPolis	10	2006–2009 (web novel); 2010–2015 (light novel)	7.2 million (including manga adaptation)
No Game No Life	Yū Kamiya	Media Factory	13	2012–present	7 million
Haganai	Yomi Hirasaka	Media Factory	11	2009–2015	7 million
The Strongest Sage with the Weakest Crest	Shinkoshoto	SB Creative	20	2016–2020 (web novel); 2017–present (light novel)	7 million
Mirage of Blaze	Mizuna Kuwabara	Shueisha	42	1990–2007	6.8 million
The Familiar of Zero	Noboru Yamaguchi	Media Factory	22	2004–2017	6.8 million
Isekai Izakaya "Nobu"	Natsuya Semikawa	Takarajimasha	7	2012–present (web novel); 2014–present (light novel)	6.7 million (including manga adaptation)
Kyo Kara Maoh!	Tomo Takabayashi	Kadokawa Shoten	22	2000–present (on hiatus)	6.5 million
The Story of Saiunkoku	Sai Yukino	Kadokawa Shoten	22	2003–2011	6.5 million
Shōnen Onmyōji	Mitsuru Yūki	Kadokawa Shoten	47	2001–present	6.2 million (including manga adaptation)
Arifureta: From Commonplace to World's Strongest	Ryo Shirakome	Overlap	13	2013–2015 (web novel); 2015–present (web novel sequel); 2013–2022 (light novel)	6 million
My Next Life as a Villainess: All Routes Lead to Doom!	Satoru Yamaguchi	Ichijinsha	16	2014–2015 (web novel); 2015–present (light novel)	6 million
Student Council's Discretion	Aoi Sekina	Fujimi Shobo	10	2008–2012	6 million
Accel World	Reki Kawahara	ASCII Media Works	28	2009–present	5.7 million
Durarara!!	Ryohgo Narita	ASCII Media Works	13	2004–2014	5.6 million
Harem in the Labyrinth of Another World	Shachi Sogano	Shufunotomo	13	2011–2019 (web novel); 2012–present (light novel)	5.6 million (including manga adaptation)
The Villainess Is Adored by the Prince of the Neighbor Kingdom	Puni-chan	Kadokawa Shoten	15	2016–present (web novel); 2016–2026 (light novel)	5.6 million
Maria-sama ga Miteru	Oyuki Konno	Shueisha	37	1998–2012	5.4 million
Oreimo	Tsukasa Fushimi	ASCII Media Works	16	2008–2021	5.2 million
The Ideal Sponger Life	Tsunehiko Watanabe	Shufunotomo	22	2011–present (web novel); 2012–present (light novel)	5.2 million
Alya Sometimes Hides Her Feelings in Russian	SunSunSun	Kadokawa Shoten	11	2021–present	5 million
Spice and Wolf	Isuna Hasekura	ASCII Media Works	24	2006–present	5 million
Toradora!	Yuyuko Takemiya	ASCII Media Works	10	2006–2009	5 million
Boogiepop	Kouhei Kadono	MediaWorks	26	1998-present	5 million

== See also ==
- List of best-selling comic series
- List of best-selling manga
- List of highest-grossing media franchises
- List of Japanese manga magazines by circulation
- List of The New York Times Manga Best Sellers
