= List of Kaze Hikaru chapters =

The chapters of the Japanese manga series Kaze Hikaru were written and illustrated by Taeko Watanabe. The series follows Tominaga Sei, a young girl who pretends to be a boy to join the Mibu-Roshi (Special Police; later known as the Shinsengumi). However, her secret is discovered when she befriends her sensei, Okita Sōji.

The manga began its serialization in Shōgakukan's Bessatsu Shōjo Comic magazine in 1997. It transferred to Shogakukan's Monthly Flowers magazine in 2002, concluding in the July 2020 issue on May 28, 2020. The first tankōbon volume was released by Shōgakukan on October 25, 1997, and the 45th and final volume was released on February 25, 2021. Shogakukan also published the series in bunkoban format, starting on November 15, 2007; it lasted for twelve volumes total, with the final volume released on September 15, 2011. Following the end of the manga series, Watanabe published an additional spin-off chapter titled Ōedo Shinsengumi! Kaze Hikaru Anazā Wārudo (大江戸新選組！風光るアナザーワールド) in the January 2021 issue of Monthly Flowers on November 27, 2020. In North America, Viz Media acquired the series rights and published the manga in its female-targeted magazine Shojo Beat, from the first issue in July 2005 until September 2006. Later, it was published in the tankōbon format; the first volume was released on January 3, 2006, and the latest—the 29th—will be released on August 3, 2021. The manga has also been licensed in Indonesia by Elex Media Komputindo, in South Korea by Haksan Culture Company, in Taiwan by Chingwin Publishing Group, and in Vietnam by NXB Trẻ.

== Volume list ==
No.	Original release date	Original ISBN	English release date	English ISBN
1	October 25, 1997	4-09-137351-8	January 3, 2006	978-1-4215-0189-5
2	April 23, 1998	4-09-137352-6	June 6, 2006	978-1-4215-0581-7
3	October 26, 1998	4-09-137353-4	November 7, 2006	978-1-4215-0582-4
4	April 22, 1999	4-09-137354-2	February 6, 2007	978-1-4215-1017-0
5	October 26, 1999	4-09-137355-0	May 1, 2007	978-1-4215-1018-7
6	February 26, 2000	4-09-137356-9	August 7, 2007	978-1-4215-1163-4
7	July 26, 2000	4-09-137357-7	November 6, 2007	978-1-4215-1164-1
8	January 26, 2001	4-09-137358-5	February 5, 2008	978-1-4215-1537-3
9	June 26, 2001	4-09-137359-3	May 6, 2008	978-1-4215-1734-6
10	November 26, 2001	4-09-137360-7	August 5, 2008	978-1-4215-1735-3
11	April 24, 2002	4-09-138101-4	November 4, 2008	978-1-4215-1736-0
12	August 23, 2002	4-09-138102-2	February 3, 2009	978-1-4215-2415-3
13	February 26, 2003	4-09-138103-0	May 5, 2009	978-1-4215-2416-0
14	July 26, 2003	4-09-138104-9	August 4, 2009	978-1-4215-2417-7
15	December 19, 2003	4-09-138105-7	November 3, 2009	978-1-4215-2418-4
16	July 26, 2004	4-09-138106-5	February 2, 2010	978-1-4215-2801-4
17	January 26, 2005	4-09-138107-3	May 4, 2010	978-1-4215-2802-1
18	August 26, 2005	4-09-138108-1	August 3, 2010	978-1-4215-2803-8
19	January 26, 2006	4-09-130323-4	August 2, 2011	978-1-4215-2804-5
20	June 26, 2006	4-09-130499-0	August 7, 2012	978-1-4215-3584-5
21	December 21, 2006	4-09-130757-4	August 6, 2013	978-1-4215-3585-2
22	June 26, 2007	978-4-09-131089-7	August 5, 2014	978-1-4215-3586-9
23	November 26, 2007	978-4-09-131386-7	August 4, 2015	978-1-4215-3587-6
24	May 26, 2008	978-4-09-131678-3	August 2, 2016	978-1-4215-3588-3
25	November 26, 2008	978-4-09-132180-0	August 1, 2017	978-1-4215-3589-0
26	May 26, 2009	978-4-09-132480-1	August 7, 2018	978-1-4215-3590-6
27	November 26, 2009	978-4-09-132806-9	October 1, 2019	978-1-9747-0662-4
28	June 25, 2010	978-4-09-133177-9	August 4, 2020	978-1-9747-1506-0
29	November 26, 2010	978-4-09-133450-3	August 3, 2021	978-1-9747-2222-8
30	June 24, 2011	978-4-09-133807-5	August 9, 2022	978-1-9747-2912-8
31	December 26, 2011	978-4-09-134109-9	August 1, 2023	978-1-9747-3760-4
32	June 26, 2012	978-4-09-134475-5	August 13, 2024	978-1-9747-4630-9
33	December 26, 2012	978-4-09-134839-5	September 2, 2025	978-1-9747-5560-8
34	August 26, 2013	978-4-09-135459-4	August 4, 2026	978-1-9747-6522-5
35	March 26, 2014	978-4-09-135737-3	—	—
36	October 24, 2014	978-4-09-136625-2	—	—
37	June 26, 2015	978-4-09-137308-3	—	—
38	January 26, 2016	978-4-09-138238-2	—	—
39	September 26, 2016	978-4-09-138667-0	—	—
40	May 26, 2017	978-4-09-139290-9	—	—
41	January 26, 2018	978-4-09-870033-2	—	—
42	September 26, 2018	978-4-09-870205-3	—	—
43	June 26, 2019	978-4-09-870455-2	—	—
44	February 26, 2020	978-4-09-870862-8	—	—
45	February 25, 2021	978-4-09-871299-1 (standard edition); 978-4-09-943079-5 (special edition)	—	—
