= Math Girls =

Book by Hiroshi Yūki

- Author: Hiroshi Yuki
- Original title: 数学ガール (Suugaku Gaaru)
- Translator: Tony Gonzalez
- Language: Japanese
- Series: Math Girls
- Subject: Mathematics
- Genre: Young adult
- Publisher: Bento Books
- Publication date: June 27, 2007
- Publication place: Japan
- English publication date: November 23, 2011
- Media type: Print (hardcover, paperback), Digital (iPad app)
- Pages: 304
- ISBN: 978-0-9839513-0-8 (paperback), ISBN 978-0-9839513-1-5 (hardcover)
- Followed by: Math Girls: Fermat's Last Theorem

Math Girls (数学ガール, Sūgaku gāru) is the first in a series of math-themed young adult novels of the same name by Japanese author Hiroshi Yuki. It was published by SoftBank Creative in 2007, followed by Math Girls: Fermat's Last Theorem in 2008, Math Girls: Gödel's Incompleteness Theorems in 2009, Math Girls: Randomized Algorithms in 2011, Math Girls: Galois Theory in 2012, and Math Girls: The Poincaré conjecture in 2018. As of December 2010, the series had sold over 100,000 books in Japan.

On November 23, 2011, an English translation of the book was released by Bento Books, who subsequently released translations of Fermat's Last Theorem and Gödel's Incompleteness Theorems on December 5, 2012, and April 25, 2016, respectively. All books in the series have an English translation as of 2022.

== Overview ==
The unnamed narrator and his schoolmates Miruka and Tetra are Japanese high school students with an interest in mathematics. Together they explore the world of mathematics by helping each other solve problems spanning a wide range of difficulty, from extensions of high school mathematics to extremely difficult problems previously addressed by famous mathematicians. While the book is presented as a novel, the bulk of its content is related to finding the solution to complex math problems, so could also be considered a form of textbook.

== Synopsis ==
At the start of his first year of high school, the narrator meets a new classmate, a girl named Miruka. Without introducing herself, she gives him the beginning to number sequences, to which he answers with their continuation. One year later, the narrator is handed a letter by another girl, a new student named Tetra. The letter she wrote is a request for the narrator to tutor her in math. He begins teaching her, making Miruka jealous. The narrator balances his friendship with Tetra and his romantic interest in Miruka until Miruka and Tetra become friends after Tetra demonstrates her dedication to learning mathematics.

== Characters ==
=== Narrator ===
The protagonist of the books. The story in each book is told from his perspective. He is a second-year student in a Japanese high school (equivalent to 11th grade in the US school system). His name is not given throughout the series. During middle school, he spent his time after school working on mathematics in the library. He begins to repeat this pattern in high school, but as his friendship with Miruka and Tetra develops, he spends most of his time working on math problems with them.

Other than the fact that he wears glasses, his physical characteristics are not described. He has a quiet personality, but is somewhat self-conscious of his mathematical ability as compared to Miruka and Tetra, and when he has difficulty solving a math problem, he tends to become depressed. He is very conscious of Miruka and Tetra as potential love interests, but is too shy to initiate a relationship with either one.

He acts as both a teacher and a student, at times working on problems given to him by Miruka or Mr. Muraki, at other times teaching Tetra. He does not like to speak before large groups of people, but he is not hesitant to speak up when teaching Tetra and Miruka.

=== Miruka ===
Miruka is a second-year high school student, in the same homeroom as the narrator. She studies mathematics with him following their first encounter under a cherry tree on the day of their entrance ceremony to high school.

She is a tall, beautiful girl with long black hair and a dignified demeanor. She wears metal-frame glasses. She has the top grades in math in her class. She tends to act without consideration of others. The narrator interprets her habit of helping herself to his notebook and starting conversations with others at inopportune times as signs of her lack of inhibitions. At one point, she is depicted as lecturing about math to another student who had no particular interest because the narrator was not there to listen to her. She tends to sulk when she feels that she is being ignored. This is shown in scenes where the narrator ignores what she is saying, or when he finds himself daydreaming.

Her actions become even more extreme when those she considers an "outsider" try to insinuate themselves into her social sphere. In one scene, she finds the narrator teaching math to Tetra (who she has never met) in the library, and responds by kicking her chair out from under her. She also stomps on the narrator's foot and walks off alone when she goes to meet him, but finds him talking to Tetra. She stops such behavior after becoming friends with Tetra. There are scenes in the book that indicate that she thinks of the narrator as more than just a friend, but she rarely reveals her emotions, so it is difficult to read her true intent towards him.

She thinks of Tetra as being "cute". At one point, she mentions to the narrator that she could never be as cute as Tetra.

She has a great love for mathematics. She is normally quiet and subdued, but immediately becomes loquacious when she starts to talk about math. She rarely talks about anything else, for example starting her first conversation with the narrator when they meet with a series of math problems.

She tends to like anyone who shows an interest in math. She is at first ambivalent, even antagonistic towards Tetra. She later warms up to Tetra, though, when she sees that she is earnestly pursuing mathematical studies with the narrator, and after she hears that Tetra has independently come up with an idea that leads to an elegant solution to the Basel problem, they become close friends.

She has a deep knowledge of mathematics, and in most cases is seen leading the narrator and Tetra through discussions.

She can play the piano, and sometimes plays arrangements for four hands with Ay-Ay during lunch.

=== Tetra ===
Tetra graduated from the same middle school as the narrator, and is a first-year high school student, one year behind the narrator and Miruka. She suffers from mathematical anxiety, and after entering high school, approaches the narrator to ask him to tutor her in math.

She is petite with short hair and large eyes, and is a sweet and energetic girl. The narrator comments that she reminds him of a squirrel eating a nut.

Tetra's expression clearly shows what she is thinking, which the narrator appreciates because it lets him know if she is following his explanations. She uses exaggerated gestures, frequently making the narrator wish that she would calm down.

She is romantically attracted to the narrator, who she also greatly respects because he takes the time to listen to what she has to say. She also thinks very highly of Miruka, and is also romantically attracted to her, what with her being bisexual

She first begins studying mathematics seriously because she thinks that she would like to go on to some kind of computer-related work, or some other career that might involve math. She is somewhat careless, though, which frequently leads to her forgetting to take mathematical conditions into consideration when trying to solve math problems. She occasionally shows flashes of deep mathematical insight that surprise even Miruka, however.

=== Ay-Ay ===
Ay-Ay is a friend of Miruka's. She is in the same grade as the narrator and Miruka, but in a different class. She is the leader of the piano club "Fortissimo", and is equally attractive with Miruka. When not in class, she spends most of her time in front of a piano.

=== Mr. Muraki ===
Mr. Muraki is a math teacher at the narrator's high school. The narrator refers to him as being "strange", but knows that Mr. Muraki likes him and the others.

He gives the narrator and Miruka math problems. The problems are always written on index cards, and many are just equations with no explanation. His reason for doing so is apparently because he wants the students to think about every step of the problem, including its creation. In fact, when he once gives Miruka a problem for which she already knows the answer, he tells her that it is not necessarily the answer that he's after. He tells her that if she already knows the answer, to use the problem to find something interesting. He shows a strong interest in his students, for example by giving them problems tailored to their abilities. He eventually begins giving Tetra cards, as well.

=== Tsunomiya ===
Tsunomiya is a classmate of the narrator's. According to the narrator, he has the best grades in his grade and is also good at sports. At one point, Miruka corners him and gives him a lecture on mathematics, but he moves away from her at the first opportunity.

=== Ms. Mizutani ===
Ms. Mizutani is the school librarian. When it becomes time for school to close, she moves quietly to the middle of the library and announces that everyone must leave. She wears dark glasses that obscure any expression.

== Mathematical topics that appear in the book ==
- Prime numbers
- Sequences
  - Fibonacci numbers
    - Generalizations of Fibonacci numbers
  - Geometric progressions
  - Arithmetic progression
  - Recurrence relations
- Pi
- Infinity
  - Infinite series
- Divisors
- Prime factorization
  - Uniqueness of prime factorization
- Absolute values
- Exponentiation
- Equations
- Mathematical Identities
- Definitions
- Factors
- Factorization
- Terms
- Trigonometric functions
  - Double angle formulas
  - Sine curves
- The complex plane
- De Moivre's theorem
- Generating functions
- Inequalities
  - Absolute inequalities
- The relationship between arithmetic and geometric means
- Square roots
- Derivatives
  - Derivative functions
- Limits
- Finite difference method
- Falling factorial
- The binomial theorem
- Test calculations
- Catalan numbers
- Convolution
- Propositions
- Elements
- Sets
- The Riemann zeta function
  - The Basel problem
  - Euler product
- Harmonic series
- Logarithmic function
- Oresme's proof
- Proof by contradiction
- Power series
  - Expanding power series
- Taylor series (Maclaurin series)
- The fundamental theorem of algebra
  - The proof by Gauss
- Partition numbers
- Upper bounds
- Mathematical induction

== Volumes ==
List of books in the main Math Girls series
| # | Japanese original | English translation |
|---|---|---|
| 1 | Yūki, Hiroshi (2007-06-27). Sūgaku Gāru 数学ガール [Math Girls] (in Japanese). Tokyo: SoftBank Creative. ISBN 9784797341379. OCLC 880549981. | Yūki, Hiroshi (2011). Math Girls. Translated by Gonzalez, Tony. Austin, Texas: Bento Books. ISBN 9780983951308. LCCN 2011937467. OCLC 770876058. |
| 2 | Yūki, Hiroshi (2008-07-30). Sūgaku Gāru: Ferumā no Saishū Teiri 数学ガール：フェルマーの最終定理 [Math Girls: Fermat's Last Theorem] (in Japanese). Tokyo: SoftBank Creative. ISBN 9784797345261. OCLC 675978423. | Yūki, Hiroshi (2012). Reeder, Joseph (ed.). Math Girls 2: Fermat's Last Theorem. Translated by Gonzalez, Tony. Austin, Texas: Bento Books. ISBN 9780983951322. LCCN 2012285911. OCLC 826413472. |
| 3 | Yūki, Hiroshi (2009-10-26). Sūgaku Gāru: Gēderu no Fukanzensei Teiri 数学ガール：ゲーデルの不完全性定理 [Math Girls: Godel's Incompleteness Theorem] (in Japanese). Tokyo: SoftBank Creative. ISBN 9784797352962. OCLC 675686679. | Yūki, Hiroshi (2016). Reeder, Joseph; Hendon, M. D. (eds.). Math Girls 3: Godel's Incompleteness Theorems. Translated by Gonzalez, Tony. Austin, Texas: Bento Books. ISBN 9781939326287. LCCN 2014958330. OCLC 953388081. |
| 4 | Yūki, Hiroshi (2011-02-26). Sūgaku Gāru: Rantaku Arugorizumu 数学ガール：乱択アルゴリズム [Math Girls: Randomized Algorithm] (in Japanese). Tokyo: SoftBank Creative. ISBN 9784797361001. OCLC 751998119. | Yūki, Hiroshi (2020). Math Girls 4: Randomized Algorithms. Translated by Gonzalez, Tony. Bento Books. ISBN 9781939326430. OCLC 1149183124. |
| 5 | Yūki, Hiroshi (2012-05-30). Sūgaku Gāru: Garoa Riron 数学ガール：ガロア理論 [Math Girls: Galois Theory] (in Japanese). Tokyo: SoftBank Creative. ISBN 9784797367546. OCLC 836386131. | Yūki, Hiroshi (2021). Math Girls 5: Galois Theory. Translated by Gonzalez, Tony. Houston: Bento Books. ISBN 9781939326461. LCCN 2021950570. OCLC 1287919775. |
| 6 | Yūki, Hiroshi (2018-04-02). Sūgaku Gāru: Poankare Yosō 数学ガール：ポアンカレ予想 [Math Girls: Poincare Conjecture] (in Japanese). Tokyo: SoftBank Creative. ISBN 9784797384789. OCLC 1037868547. | Yūki, Hiroshi (2022-03-14). Math Girls 6: The Poincaré Conjecture. Translated by Gonzalez, Tony. Austin, Texas: Bento Books. ISBN 9781939326515. OCLC 1314430887. |

=== Other translations ===
- Traditional Chinese: 結城 浩 (2008). 數學少女. SDwing (Illustrator). Ching Win Publishing. ISBN 978-986-209-372-6.
- Simplified Chinese: 结城 浩 (2009). 数学女孩. 朱一飞 (translator). 安徽教育出版社. ISBN 978-7533653576.
- Korean: 유키 히로시 (2008). 수학 걸. Dong-A Ilbo. ISBN 978-89-7090-552-5.

See other language versions of Wikipedia for the translations of the other books in the series "Math Girls".

== Spinoff media ==
=== Manga ===
A Math Girls manga, illustrated by Mika Hisaka, serialized 14 chapters between April 2008 and June 2009 in Comic Flapper (except for the November 2008 issue). The chapters were subsequently published in two tankōbon volumes. This was followed by subsequent manga and tankōbon versions of Math Girls 2: Fermat's Last Theorem (illustrated by Kasuga Shun) and Math Girls 3: Gödel's Incompleteness Theorems (illustrated by Matsuzaki Miyuki). Math Girls Manga appeared in English translation from Bento Books in 2013 (ISBN 978-0983951346), followed by Math Girls Manga 2 in 2016 (ISBN 978-0983951353).

=== Math primers ===
Hiroshi Yuki also authors the Math Girls Talk About... (数学ガールの秘密ノート, Sūgaku Gāru no himitsu nōto; lit., 'Secret Notebooks of the Math Girls') series of mathematics primers. These books take the form of characters from the Math Girls series discussing various topics from mathematics, but can be considered nonfiction in that they are intended to be strictly instructional, and do not advance the storyline of the Math Girls series. The following titles from this series are available in English translation from Bento Books:

- Math Girls Talk About... Equations and Graphs (ISBN 978-1939326195)
- Math Girls Talk About... Integers (ISBN 978-1939326232)
- Math Girls Talk About... Trigonometry (ISBN 978-1939326256)

Other books in this series currently available only in Japanese cover sequences and series, calculus, vectors, probability, and statistics.
