= List of light novel labels =

This is a list of light novel labels i.e. Japanese publishing imprints that release light novels.

== Bunkobon ==
- B's LOG Bunko – affiliated with Enterbrain
- Dengeki Bunko – affiliated with ASCII Media Works
- Famitsu Bunko – affiliated with Enterbrain
- Fujimi Fantasia Bunko – affiliated with Fujimi Shobo
- GA Bunko – affiliated with SB Creative
- Gagaga Bunko – affiliated with Shogakukan
- HJ Bunko – affiliated with Hobby Japan
- Kadokawa Sneaker Bunko, Kadokawa Beans Bunko – affiliated with Kadokawa Shoten
- Kodansha Ranobe Bunko - affiliated with Kodansha
- Kono Light Novel ga Sugoi! Bunko – affiliated with Takarajimasha
- LINE Bunko Edge - LINE
- Media Works Bunko – affiliated with ASCII Media Works
- Megami Bunko – affiliated with Gakken
- MF Bunko J – affiliated with Media Factory
- Nagomi Bunko – affiliated with Harvest Shuppan
- Sohgeisha Clear Bunko – affiliated with Sohgeisha
- Super Dash Bunko, Cobalt Bunko and JUMP j-BOOKS – affiliated with Shueisha
- VA Bunko – affiliated with Visual Art's

== Tankōbon ==
- Dengeki no Shin Bungei – affiliated with ASCII Media Works
- GA Novel – affiliated with SB Creative
- GC Novels - affiliated with Micro Magazine
- HJ Novels – affiliated with Hobby Japan
- Kadokawa Books – affiliated with Fujimi Shobo
- MF Books – affiliated with Media Factory
- TO Books - affiliated with T.O Entertainment
