= Family! =

Japanese comedy manga and anime series

- The title card of the anime adaptation

ファミリ! (Famirī!)
- Genre: Comedy
- Manga
- Written by: Taeko Watanabe
- Published by: Shogakukan
- Imprint: Flower Comics
- Magazine: Bessatsu Shōjo Comic
- Original run: July 1981 – September 1985
- Volumes: 11
- Anime television series

Oh! Family
- Directed by: Masamune Ochiai
- Produced by: Hyota Ezu (TV Tokyo); Takashi Kuoka (Knack)
- Music by: Tadashige Matsui
- Studio: Knack Productions
- Original network: MegaTON (TV Tokyo)
- Original run: October 6, 1986 – March 30, 1987
- Episodes: 26

Family! (Japanese: ファミリー!, Hepburn: Famirī!) is a Japanese comedy manga series written and illustrated by Taeko Watanabe, the author of Kaze Hikaru. The story follows the lives of the Andersons, a conventionally dysfunctional family in which the parents are as childish as the children are mature; nevertheless, they manage to live happily together.

The manga was serialized in Shogakukan's Bessatsu Shōjo Comic magazine from the July 1981 issue to the September 1985 issue. Shogakukan later collected the individual chapters into 11 tankōbon (bound volumes) under the Flower Comics imprint. The first volume was published on March 25, 1982; the last volume was published on November 26, 1985.

In 1986, Family! was adapted into a 26-episode anime television series titled Oh! Family (Oh!ファミリー, Oh! Famirī), directed by Masamune Ochiai and broadcast on TV Tokyo. Outside of Japan, the anime had significant success in Italy, where it was broadcast on Italia 1, under the title Che famiglia è questa Family!

== Plot ==
The story revolves around the Andersons, an American family who resided in Los Angeles, California. Everything was turned upside down when a strange boy named Jonathan arrived with his dog Adam and claimed to be an illegitimate son of Wilfred Anderson, the wimpy father of the family. That turned out not to be true, but aside from his trickery, Jonathan's kind nature won over the family and they decided to adopt him (and his dog, too).

The family had got involved in several misadventures, but despite their dysfunction, they remained a loving family and their relationships with each other and the people around them only strengthened.

== Characters ==
Wilfred "Freddy" Anderson (ウィルフレッド・アンダーソン, Wirufureddo Andāson)
Voiced by: Kei Tomiyama
Also called Freddy (フレディ, Furedi), a wimpy father who wasn't much of role model material, but still cared a lot about his family. He got into big trouble when Jonathan came and claimed to be his illegitimate son. Despite his best effort to cross his heart, everyone thought that was true until Jonathan admitted it himself, although other members (including his own wife Sharen and excluding his daughter Fee), wasn't bothered that much by Jonathan's presence. Wilfred's path to marrying Sharen had been quite adverse as he had nearly got beaten to death by her sister, but in the end, the wimpy guy had proven his worth with his determination, and had a family with three children, although he got scarred and dreaded his sister-in-law for life.
Sharen Anderson (シェレン・アンダーソン, Sheren Andāson)
Voiced by: Sanae Takagi
Née Witherby (ウィザビー, Wizabī), she was the mother of the family. Back when her children, Kay and Fee, had been toddlers, she proved to be decent mother material, but as they had grown into teenagers, she, for some reason, turned into a carefree, oblivious, infantile and clumsy woman who liked dressing up as Cookie Monster (called Happy Monster in the anime). She had an insanely protective sister who had been willing to beat her boyfriends to a pulp to see if they would be strong-willed enough to protect her, and Wilfred seemed to be the only one.
Fee Anderson (フィー・アンダーソン, Fī Andāson)
Voiced by: Sumi Shimamoto
The essential lead character of the story, a 15-year-old tomboy who was the middle child of the Anderson family. She was very boyish and had always been that way since childhood, but she gradually showed her feminine side since she dated Ralph. She didn't perform that well in school and frequently got D's in Spanish. She was the main straight man character of the story, who tried her best to keep other Andersons in check, despite her own rashness. She cared a lot about other people, although some may have taken it as being annoyingly nosy. When Jonathan came, she was the only one who was suspicious of his story (while Wilfred himself could do nothing but crying and begging for understanding), and she exposed Jonathan. In the end however, she warmed up to him like everyone else (even Wilfred) had always been since the beginning, despite the fact that they fought a lot.
Kay Anderson (ケイ・アンダーソン, Kei Andāson)
Voiced by: Shigeru Nakahara
The Andersons' eldest child who was 17 years old. He cared a lot about his sister Fee and they were close, to the point that Fee actually got irritated when he started dating again (a condition that Ralph half-jokingly dubbed "brother complex"). While Fee was boyish, he was girlish and gentle. When they were kids, Fee would refuse to wear the dresses her parents'd bought; Kay had once tried one, and after Fee'd told him that he'd looked good in it, he'd started to embrace his femininity and that enabled him to express himself freely as a gay man. Ralph was one of his boyfriends.
Tracy Anderson (トレーシー・アンダーソン, Torēshī Andāson)
Voiced by: Naoko Matsui
The Andersons' youngest daughter, she was a pretty, but outspoken, 7-year-old girl. Her appearance was admired by her classmates, but she was only interested in adult men. She was quite mature for a 7-year-old when speaking to adults, but she still had her childlike hobbies. She was once cast for a TV role for her straightforward attitude, but also for her surprising acting talent, but that didn't interest her for long.
Jonathan Allen (ジョナサン・アレン, Jonasan Aren)
Voiced by: Masako Sugaya
A strange boy who claimed to be Wilfred's illegitimate son out of the blue one day. He was incredibly astute for a 6-year-old as he could think of such trickery to fool a whole family into believing, although in all fairness, the Andersons were simply either carefree or just oblivious. The only one who was always suspicious of him was Fee. She later found out the truth, upon learning which he and his dog Adam left immediately. It turned out that while other Andersons didn't mind his presence at all, Fee, who Jonathan cared about the most, was the only one who wasn't even trying to being nice to him. And when she learned, she went on in search for him. The Andersons managed to rescue Jonathan and Adam out of pit which the two fell into in search for a new home. It was revealed later that he had to leave his fostering uncle's family because they wanted to kill Adam. At the end of the series, Jonathan had to leave, albeit in tearful farewell, the Andersons, to go and live with his biological father.
Adam (アダム, Adamu)
Voiced by: Ikuya Sawaki
A big but cowardly dog who was very intelligent for a dog (because he could understand humans and communicate with them to some extent with sign language), but still stupid by human standard. He was Jonathan's closest friend growing up. He had no romantic interest in dogs.
Ralph McGarry (レイフ・マクギャリー, Reifu MakuGyarī)
Voiced by: Keiichi Nanba
Fee's boyfriend. He was originally in a relationship with Kay, until he got to know his tomboy sister. He then broke up with Kay (they still remained good friends) and developed feelings for Fee, although he still had trouble expressing his feelings to an insensitive and clueless Fee. Ralph always addressed his parents Jay and Louise by name even though Jay always insisted that he call him "dad" (父さん, tō-san).
James "Jay" McGarry (ジェイムズ・マクギャリー, Jeimuzu MakuGyarī)
Nicknamed Jay (ジェイ, Jei), he was a well-known TV drama director. He was also outspoken and harsh, even when he met his match, Tracy as she was cast for his show. He lived with his boyfriend and his son, Ralph, which explained Ralph's homosexuality. Despite being gay, he had wanted a son, so he actually got into a sexual relationship with Louise for that sole purpose, then later broke up with her.
Louise Goldman (ルイス・ゴールドマン, Ruisu Gōrudoman)
Ralph's mother, who he mistakenly thought was dead because of her absence ever since he had been born, until Jay told him otherwise which enabled Ralph to seek her out and reunite. She also directed TV shows. After breaking up with Jay and leaving Ralph's custody to him, Louise continued working in TV and had a relationship with a man named Arthur who later died in a traffic accident.
Leo (リオ, Rio)
James's boyfriend. While James was inconsiderate, he was tactful and caring when talking to Ralph.
Clarissa Harwell (クラリッサ・ハーウェル, Kurarissa Hāweru)
An old woman who was widowed after her husband died and left her nothing but his wealth. Despite her age, she was quite a crybaby. She wanted to adopt Jonathan because he bore a strong resemblance to her son Harry (ハリー, Harī) who died young. The day Fee decided to support such an adoption for his own good was also the day she realized how much Jonathan meant to her and her to him. Although, Mrs. Harwell couldn't have Jonathan as her son, she remained a close neighbor to the Andersons.
Carrie (キャリー, Kyarī)
Mrs. Harwell's young housekeeper who was very blunt and casual to her employer, even disrespectful sometimes. She chewed bubblegum almost all the time.
Linda Blinks (リンダ・ブリンクス, Rinda Burinkusu)
Jonathan's teacher who discovered his high intellect that was beyond that of a kindergartener. She and the principal convinced him to take a special class rather than just have fun with his kindergarten friends. In the end, they realize how wrong they were not to let a child just be child, Jonathan went back to being just a smart kid in the class.
Lola (ローラ, Rōra)
A woman with whom Fee worked at a bookstore who had a little dog that her boyfriend had given her and that she named Kitty (キティ, Kiti). At first everyone thought Adam lost his appetite because he had a crush on Kitty, but it turned out that he actually liked Lola. His infatuation, however, ended when her actual boyfriend Adam reunited after a long time since they had broken up.
John "Jack" Schaefer (ジョン・シェーファー, Jon Shēfā)
A kidnapper nicknamed Jack (ジャック, Jakku) who completely failed at kidnapping: he mistook Tracy for a girl named Gloria McNeil (グロリア・マクニール, Guroria Makunīru), only realized it when Tracy told him, failed to threaten anyone for ransom, and could do pretty much nothing without his own hostage's help, all in a desperate attempt to become famous and to make his mother proud. But with Tracy's help throughout his soul-searching, he finally got "out of the box" and realized his way going forward. The whole ordeal also showed how completely fearless Tracy was and how carefree all of the Andersons (except Fee) were when one of them was supposedly kidnapped and actually gone for days.
Mariko (マリコ)
A Japanese student who went to live with the Andersons in California for the time she studied there. She had a crush on Fee and later Kay without ever knowing that she was a girl and he was gay. She was frustrated with Japan's socially restrictive culture and envied the freedom that her host family enjoyed, but in the end she realized that Japan is just different and not even that bad.
Emily (エミリ, Emiri)
A girl in Jonathan's class. She was very timid and reserved. For some reason, she was very clingy to Jonathan and refused to play with anyone but him which was good because he was very caring but also bad because she was frequently bullied as a result. Not until Jonathan was beaten almost senseless defending her did she tell the bully off, and started to open up with everyone else. It turned out the reason why she was so attached to Jonathan is because he looked exactly like her stuffed monkey.
Pete (ピート, Pīto)
The chief bully in Jonathan's class. Jonathan was the only one to manage to "tame" him with his caring, and eventually, they became best friends.
