= Quantum Devil Saga: Avatar Tuner, Vol. 1 =

2011 novel by Yu Godai

- Front cover of the 1st English edition (2014)
- Author: Yu Godai
- Original title: クォンタムデビルサーガ アバタールチューナー I
- Translator: Kevin Frane
- Cover artist: Hirotaka Maeda
- Language: Japanese
- Genre: Novel
- Publisher: Hayakawa Publishing; Bento Books (English)
- Publication date: 2011 (1st edition); 2014 (English edition)
- Publication place: Japan
- Media type: Print (Hardcover, Paperback, Kindle)
- Pages: 254 (English 1st ed. hardcover 2014)
- ISBN: 978-1-939326-01-0 (English 1st ed. hardcover 2014)

Quantum Devil Saga: Avatar Tuner, Vol. 1 (クォンタムデビルサーガ アバタールチューナー I, Kuontamu Debiru Sāga Abatāru Chūnā I; Quantum Devil Saga, Avatar Tuner I) is a 2011 science fiction novel by Japanese author Yu Godai, the first in a series of five installments. It is the author's reimagined take on the story of the Digital Devil Saga series of role-playing games (for which she was also the original story creator, she had to leave halfway for health reasons). While the original games were set in the world of the Megami Tensei video games, the novel series does not take place in the Megami Tensei continuity.

== Plot ==
In the post-apocalyptic Junkyard, warring tribes vie to unify the six territories and thus gain entrance to Nirvana, the promised land. This battlefield is watched over by the Church, a religious order that decides the rules of this bleak world. Serph is the leader of the small but intrepid Embryon tribe, which consists of him, the tribe's core members, and a handful of foot soldiers. When a mysterious object appears in the Junkyard, it incites a battle between the Embryon tribe and the rival Vanguards. In the aftermath of this firefight, Serph discovers a mysterious girl named Sera, and finds that he and his closest warriors have gained the ability to transform into powerful demons. The Embryon must adapt to these developments and try to understand their meaning as the balance of power begins to shift in the Junkyard.

== Characters ==
- Serph – the leader of the up-and-coming Embryon tribe.
- Argilla – a crack sniper and one of the core warriors of Serph's tribe.
- Heat – one of the two original two members of the Embryon, along with Serph, and part of the tribe's shock troops.
- Gale – the Bishop, or intelligence analyst, of the Embryon tribe.
- Cielo – a young foot soldier who is also one of the core members Serph's tribe.
- Sera – a mysterious girl who appears in Junkyard in the aftermath of a battle.

== English-language editions ==
- Yu Godai, Quantum Devil Saga: Avatar Tuner, Vol. 1 (Kuontamu Debiru Sāga Abatāru Chūnā I), translated by Kevin Frane, 1st hardback ed., Austin, TX : Bento Books, Inc., 2014, 254 p. ISBN 978-1-939326-01-0
