= Kaoru Ohno =

Japanese writer

Kaoru Ohno (大野 芳 Ōno Kaoru, born 10 August 1941) is a Japanese writer.

== Biography ==
Ohno was born in Aichi Prefecture and graduated from the Meiji University School of Law. He worked for a publishing company and as a magazine reporter before becoming a full-time author. In 1982, in the first annual Ushio Awards, his book Kitabari took the Special Prize in Nonfiction. Kodansha published his first novel, Hungary Bukyoku wo Mouichido, in 1989. He has written several books related to Japanese military history, with particular focus on the World War II era.

== Bibliography ==
- Kitabari (Ushio, 1982/ Chobunko, 1985)
- 1984-nen no Tokkōki (Asahishinbunsha, 1984)
- Hangaria Bukyoku wo Mouichido (Kodansha, 1989)
- Senkan Yamato Tenshisu (Shinchosha, 1993)
- Zekkai Misshitsu (Shinchosha, 1998)
- Konoe Hidemaro (Kondansha, 2006)
- Shi ni Zama ni Miru Shyōwashi (Heibonsha Shinsho, 2010)
- 8-gatsu 17-nichi, Sorengun Jyōrikusu (Shinchosha, 2008/ Shinchosha, 2010)
- Tokumukan 'Shyūkoku' no Shyōwashi (Shinchosha, 2009)
- Tenno no Angō (Gakken Kenkusha, 2011)

== Translations ==
- Cage on the Sea (Bento Books, 2014)
