= Cage on the Sea =

1998 novel by Kaoru Ohno

- First English edition (2014)
- Author: Kaoru Ohno
- Original title: 絶海密室
- Translator: Giles Murray
- Cover artist: Kasia Bytnerowicz
- Language: Japanese
- Publisher: Bento Books (English)
- Publication date: 1998 (1st edition)
- Publication place: Japan
- Media type: Print (Hardcover)
- Pages: 420 (English 1st ed. hardcover 2014)
- ISBN: 0-98395-138-1 (English 1st ed. hardcover 2014)

Cage on the Sea (絶海密室, Zekkai Misshitsu; Distant Seas, Locked Room) is a 1998 novel, written by Japanese author Kaoru Ohno about a group of Japanese holdouts on the island of Anatahan in the Pacific Ocean.

== Plot ==
During the Pacific War, after three Japanese supply ships are sunk off the shore of Anatahan, the survivors are taken in by Kikuichiro Higa and Kazuko, his live-in wife, who have a small coconut plantation on the island. Commanding officer, Sgt. Junzo Itami, tries to maintain discipline, but as the group endures U.S. airstrikes and food shortages order begins to break down. Soon the men become obsessed with Kazuko, the lone woman on the island, and a vicious dynamic sets in among the survivors.

== Characters ==
- Kikuichiro Higa – the Okinawan owner of a small coconut plantation on the island.
- Kazuko Higa – Kikuichiro's common-law wife.
- Junzo Itami – an Imperial Japanese Navy sergeant who becomes the group's commanding officer after they are shipwrecked on the island.
- James B. Johnson – a United States Navy captain tasked with coaxing the surviving Japanese on Anatahan out of hiding.

== Reception ==
The novel received a favorable review from Tim Hornyak in The Japan Times.

== English-language editions ==
- Kaoru Ohno, Cage on the Sea (Zekkai Misshitsu), translated by Giles Murray, 1st hardback ed., Austin, TX : Bento Books, Inc., 1998, 420 p. ISBN 0-98395-138-1

== See also ==
- Anatahan, a 1953 film directed by Josef von Sternberg also inspired by the Anatahan holdouts
