= Bento Books =

Independent American book publisher

- Founded: 2011
- Founder: Tony Gonzalez, Joseph Reeder, Alexander O. Smith
- Country of origin: United States
- Headquarters location: Austin, Texas
- Distribution: Createspace, Amazon Kindle, iBooks
- Publication types: Books
- Official website: bentobooks.com

Bento Books is an independent American book publisher based in Austin, Texas.

== History ==
Bento Books was founded in 2011 by three experienced translators, Tony Gonzalez, Joseph Reeder, and Alexander O. Smith. Bento Books publishes English translations of Japanese titles, with an emphasis on works overlooked by traditional publishers.

== Publications ==
In 2011, the company released Math Girls, the first in a series of math-themed young adult novels by Hiroshi Yuki that can also be used as textbooks.

March 2014 saw the release of Cage on the Sea by Kaoru Ohno, a novel based on a true story about a group of Japanese holdouts on the island of Anatahan after the end of the Second World War. Later that same year the company announced plans to release Avatar Tuner, Vol. 1 by Yu Godai, a novel set in the world of the popular Megami Tensei video games.
