= Sai Yukino =

Japanese writer

- 雪乃 紗衣
- Born: January 26, 1982 (age 44); Ibaraki Prefecture, Japan
- Occupation: Novelist
- Writing career
- Language: Japanese
- Period: 2003–present
- Genre: Light novel
- Notable work: The Story of Saiunkoku
- Website: Official blog "Gento"

Sai Yukino (雪乃 紗衣, Yukino Sai; born January 26, 1982) is a Japanese female author from Ibaraki Prefecture. She is best known for her light novel The Story of Saiunkoku series.

== Works ==
=== Light novels ===
Written by Sai Yukino and illustrated by Kairi Yura, the light novel series The Story of Saiunkoku has been serialized in The Beans since 2003. The individual chapters are collected and published in full novel volumes by Kadokawa Shoten with the first volume released in Japan on October 31, 2003. As of April 2010, 16 volumes have been released for the series.

No.	Title	Release date	ISBN
01	Hajimari no Kaze wa Akaku (はじまりの風は紅く)	October 31, 2003	4-04-449901-2
02	Ougon no Yakusoku (黄金の約束)	February 28, 2004	4-04-449902-0
03	Hana wa Murasaki Miya ni Saku (花は紫宮に咲く)	July 31, 2004	4-04-449903-9
04	Omoi wa Haruka naru Chato e (想いは遙かなる茶都へ)	September 30, 2004	4-04-449904-7
05	Shikkoku no Tsuki no Utage (漆黒の月の宴)	March 1, 2005	4-04-449905-5
06	Kake yuku Hakugin no Sunadokei (欠けゆく白銀の砂時計)	July 30, 2005	4-04-449907-1
07	Kokoro wa Ai Yori mo Fukaku (心は藍よりも深く)	September 30, 2005	4-04-449908-X
08	Hikari Furu Heki no Daichi (光降る碧の大地)	February 1, 2006	4-04-449909-8
09	Koubai wa Yoru ni Kaoru (紅梅は夜に香る)	September 1, 2006	4-04-449911-X
10	Ryokufuu wa Ha no Gotoku (緑風は刃のごとく)	October 1, 2006	4-04-449912-8
11	Aoarashi ni Yureru Tsukikusa (青嵐にゆれる月草)	April 1, 2007	978-4-04-449913-6
12	Hakukou wa Ten o Mezasu (白虹は天をめざす)	September 1, 2007	978-4-04-449914-3
13	Reimei ni Kohaku wa Kirameku (黎明に琥珀はきらめく)	May 1, 2008	978-4-04-449916-7
14	Kokuchou wa Ori ni Torawareru (黒蝶は檻にとらわれる)	December 1, 2008	978-4-04-449917-4
15	Kuraki Tasogare no Miya (暗き黄昏の宮)	December 1, 2009	978-4-04-449919-8
16	Aoki Meikyuu no Miko (蒼き迷宮の巫女)	April 1, 2010	978-4-04-449920-4
17	Shian no Gyokuza (Jou) (紫闇の玉座（上）)	June 1, 2011	978-4-04-449921-1
18	Shian no Gyokuza (Ge) (紫闇の玉座（下）)	July 1, 2011	978-4-04-449922-8

=== Side stories ===
Sai Yukino has written a series of short side stories for The Story of Saiunkoku which are published in collected volumes by Kadokawa Shoten. The first volume was released in April 2005; as of May 2009, four volumes have been released.

No.	Title	Release date	ISBN
1	Shu ni Majiwareba Beni (朱にまじわれば紅)	April 28, 2005	4-04-449906-3
2	Ai Yori Dedete Ao (藍より出でて青)	April 1, 2006	4-04-449910-1
3	Tonari no Hyakugou wa Shiro (隣の百合は白)	November 1, 2007	978-4-04-449915-0
4	Kouryou no Yume (黄粱の夢)	May 1, 2009	978-4-04-449918-1

== See also ==
- The Story of Saiunkoku
