= The Story of Saiunkoku =

Japanese media franchise

- Cover of the first light novel volume

彩雲国物語 (Saiunkoku Monogatari)
- Genre: Historical fantasy; Romance
- Light novel
- Written by: Sai Yukino
- Illustrated by: Kairi Yura
- Published by: Kadokawa Shoten
- Imprint: Kadokawa Beans Bunko
- Original run: October 31, 2003 – March 26, 2012
- Volumes: 18 + 5 side-stories
- Manga
- Written by: Sai Yukino
- Illustrated by: Kairi Yura
- Published by: Kadokawa Shoten
- English publisher: NA: Viz Media
- Magazine: Monthly Asuka
- Original run: 2005 – 2012
- Volumes: 9
- Anime television series
- Directed by: Jun Shishido
- Produced by: Yūji Shinoda; Ikuko Shimokawara
- Written by: Reiko Yoshida
- Music by: Kunihiko Ryo
- Studio: Madhouse
- Licensed by: NA: Geneon Entertainment
- Original network: NHK, Animax
- English network: SEA: Animax Asia
- Original run: April 8, 2006 – February 24, 2007
- Episodes: 39
- Anime television series

Saiunkoku Monogatari Second Series
- Directed by: Jun Shishido
- Produced by: Yūji Shinoda; Ikuko Shimokawara
- Written by: Miho Maruo
- Music by: Kunihiko Ryo
- Studio: Madhouse
- Original network: NHK
- English network: SEA: Animax Asia
- Original run: April 7, 2007 – March 8, 2008
- Episodes: 39
- icon

The Story of Saiunkoku (Japanese: 彩雲国物語, Hepburn: Saiunkoku Monogatari; lit. 'Tale of the Kingdom of Colored Clouds'), also known as Colour Cloud Palace, is a series of Japanese light novels written by Sai Yukino and illustrated by Kairi Yura set in a fictional country based on ancient China. As of July 2011, the eighteenth and final volume was released, concluding the series. Four side story anthologies have also been released, collecting stories originally published in The Beans magazine.

A manga version, also illustrated by Kairi Yura, was serialized in Beans Ace, which is published by Kadokawa Shoten. However, when Beans Ace ended, the manga was moved to Monthly Asuka. Nine tankōbon volumes have been released. The series has been licensed by Viz Media for an English release in North America as part of their Shojo Beat imprint.

The anime adaptation series, produced by Madhouse and directed by Jun Shishido, was broadcast on the Japanese television network NHK on Saturday mornings. The first season began airing on April 8, 2006, and completed its run on February 24, 2007, airing a total of 39 episodes. The second season, titled Saiunkoku Monogatari Second Series (彩雲国物語 第2シリーズ) began airing on April 7, 2007, and consists of another 39 episodes, ending its run on March 8, 2008. A live action Chinese drama adaptation was set for release in 2024.

== Plot ==
Set in the fictional empire of Saiunkoku, the story centers on Shurei Hong (Ko), a descendant of a noble family that has fallen on hard times. Her father works as a librarian in the Imperial palace, a post which offers prestige and respect, but little compensation. Shurei teaches in the temple school and works odd jobs to make ends meet, but her dream is to pass the imperial examinations and take a post in government, a career path forbidden to women.

The new Emperor, Ryuki Shi, has gained a reputation for being uninterested in courtly matters and for flaunting his love for men. So the Emperor's Grand Adviser makes a startling offer for her to join the imperial household for six months as the young Emperor's consort and teach the Emperor to be a responsible ruler. She easily accepts the invitation as she will receive a reward of 500 gold coins if she succeeds. The mysterious Seiran, a young man who was adopted by her father, goes with her as Ryuki's bodyguard. Entering the imperial palace revives Shurei's dream of being a court official.

The story details the hardships of creating change, especially as a woman, Shurei's growing relationship with the Emperor and other members of the court, the intrigues of imperial politics, and her commitment to better herself and her country.

== Characters ==
Shurei Hong (紅 秀麗, Kō Shūrei)
Voiced by: Houko Kuwashima (Japanese); Kelly Sheridan (English)
She is the daughter and only child of Shoka Hong. She is sixteen years old when the story begins. As a descendant of the direct line, she has the title hime or 'Lady'. Despite the high social status of her family, Shurei grew up in relatively impoverished circumstances. Shurei is the first woman in the history of Saiunkoku to pass the Imperial Exams, with the third-highest score. Shurei later accepts a position as an official in the Censorate or Inspector in the capital.
Seiran Si (茈 静蘭, Shi Seiran)
Voiced by: Hikaru Midorikawa (Japanese); Andrew Francis (English)
He is a young man in his early twenties and is the sole remaining retainer in the personal household of Shōka Hong, who took him in thirteen years ago. Seiran is later revealed to be Seien Shi (紫 清苑, Shi Seien), Ryuki's second-eldest brother. Though he claims to be 21 years old, he is actually 26 years old at the start of the series.
Shoka Hong (紅 邵可, Kō Shōka)
Voiced by: Shūichi Ikeda (Japanese); Michael Kopsa (English)
He is Shurei's father, Seiran's adoptive father and the eldest son of the Hong clan. Despite his mild-mannered exterior, Shoka is a semi-retired deadly assassin known as The Black Wolf.
Shokun Hyo (縹 薔君, Hyō Shokun)
Voiced by: Mie Sonozaki (Japanese); Lisa Ann Beley (English)
She was the mother of Shurei, adoptive mother of Seiran, and wife of Shoka. Shokun is later revealed as the Rose Princess (薔薇姫, Bara-Hime) of the Hyo family. She had the ability to cure any illness and many men sought her hand in marriage. Shokun is revealed to be the Red Immortal, one of the Eight Sages who served the first emperor. Her spell makes Shurei healthier by sealing her spirit within her daughter.
Koyu Ri (李 絳攸, Ri Kōyū)
Voiced by: Nobuyuki Hiyama (Japanese); Andrew Toth (English)
He holds the rank of Vice-Secretary of the Department of Civil Administration, serving beneath Reishin Hong, who is also his foster father. Koyu is notorious for not having sense of direction, and constantly getting lost in the Imperial Palace, and unable to get anywhere without the assistance of others. Koyu has a close relationship with Shūei Ran, though he loudly denies being the latter's friend. He loses his temper with very little prodding and gets tongue-tied speaking in official functions with large crowds.
Reishin Hong (紅 黎深, Kō Reishin)
Voiced by: Mitsuaki Madono (Japanese); Louis Chirillo (English)
He is in charge of the Department of Civil Administration, which makes him Koyu's bureaucratic superior as well as adoptive father. He is a good friend of his fellow official Kijin Ko. Kijin describes him as being crafty and coldhearted, but Reishin usually seems very cheerful, easy-going, and even childish. He often engages in devious and secretive behavior, especially regarding his family.
Yuri-hime (百合姫)
She is Reishin's wife and Kōyū's adoptive mother. Unlike her husband, Yuri is practical and straightforward in her manner, as well as kind and thoughtful; Shōka attributes her influence as the reason why Koyu was able to become a capable young man. She is also responsible for helping to raise Kuro during his childhood and she is well-regarded in the Hong clan.
Kuro Hong (紅 玖琅, Kō Kurō)
Voiced by: Ryōtarō Okiayu (Japanese); David Orth (English)
He is the youngest brother of Shoka and Reishin, acts as the proxy head of the Hong clan and many outsiders believe him to be the true leader. A man of tradition and family loyalty, Kuro urged their father to pass over Shoka in favor of Reishin as the next clan leader. Despite his rigid and formal attitude, he cares greatly for the well-being of his family.
Ryuki Shi (紫 劉輝, Shi Ryūki)
Voiced by: Tomokazu Seki (Japanese); Brad Swaile (English)
He is the reigning emperor of Saiunkoku, Ryuki Shi is nineteen years old when the story begins. As the youngest of the previous Emperor's six sons, each from a different mother, he had been an unlikely candidate to ascend to the throne. In childhood, Ryuki was badly treated by his mother and most of his half-brothers, who would beat him and lock him in a storage house for days in a row. Ryuki often took refuge in the garden or the imperial archives.
Kijin Ko (黄 奇人, Kō Kijin)
Voiced by: Kazuhiro Nakata (Japanese); Mark Oliver (English)
He is the Chief Minister of the Department of Treasury and Taxation. Many people consider him mysterious and eccentric, especially because of his unusual appearance. He leaves his hair loosely flowing instead of binding it up according to custom, and is almost never seen without one of the masks from his wide collection. In his official capacity, Kijin tends to be very strict, but he is gracious to Shurei when she begins to work for him.
Enjun Sa (茶 鴛洵, Sa Enjun)
Voiced by: Naoki Bandō (Japanese); French Tickner, Trevor Devall (English)
He is one of the three Grand Officials of the Palace, holding the title of Taiho. Sa-Taiho has held a long history of frustrated ambition. He never manages to surpass Advisor Sho, his longtime friend and fellow Grand Official.
Yushun Tei (鄭 悠舜, Tei Yūshun)
Voiced by: Nobutoshi Canna (Japanese); Vincent Tong (English)
He is a mild-mannered man in his late thirties who walks with a cane. Despite his gentle exterior, Yushun is considered to be dangerous and very powerful. Yushun is an effective politician who can accurately predict the current situation, and can be persuasive in debate.
Kocho (蝴蝶)
Voiced by: Kaori Yamagata (Japanese); Janyse Jaud (English)
She is the beautiful mistress of Kogaro, the most prestigious pleasure house in the red-light district. She is fond of Shurei, who worked as her accountant for many years. Not only is she one of the most sought-after courtesans, she is also the underground boss in charge of the region.
Suo Shin (榛 蘇芳, Shin Suō)
Voiced by: Anri Katsu
He is an official working for the Inspector General. He is prone to thoughtlessly saying whatever is on his mind and regarded as a fool, despite being highly perceptive and critical. Because he does not like putting effort into anything, Suo is both intrigued and annoyed by Shurei's continual determination to do her best. Suo can perceive a situation's complete context or a person's true character, and he tries to lessen Shurei's naiveté by showing her the evils of the world.
Seiga Riku (陸 清雅, Riku Seiga)
Voiced by: Showtaro Morikubo
He is the undersecretary of Censorate, known as the "Official Killer" for his ruthless persecution of officials. Seiga is an ambitious and cynical man who does not think highly of Shurei and he often harasses her. A promising and confident official, he is known for his willingness to sacrifice others to achieve his goals.
Ensei Ro (浪 燕青, Rō Ensei)
Voiced by: Kentarō Itō (Japanese); Jason Simpson (English)
He makes his first appearance as a half-starved man lying in front of Shurei's estate. Seiran dislikes him because of their shared past in the Satsujinzoku gang, when Ensei earned the nickname of "Little rascal King". Ensei's true specialty is close-range unarmed combat. He has a cross-shaped scar under his left eye and initially sports a bushy beard which irritates Shurei and makes many people describe him as a bear.
Eigetsu To (杜 影月, Tō Eigetsu)
Voiced by: Daisuke Namikawa (Japanese); Reece Thompson (English)
He is a shy, intelligent thirteen-year-old boy. He was born in Seika village, Koku province, but the rest of the village was wiped out by plague. Eigetsu does not like to consume alcohol or even smell it, because it brings our another persona, Yogetsu (陽月), who is brash, arrogant, and an excellent fighter. In contrast to Eigetsu's gentle manner and academic inclinations, Yogetsu's intelligence leans towards being calculating and strategic.

== Media ==
=== Light novels ===
Written by Sai Yukino and illustrated by Kairi Yura, the light novel series The Story of Saiunkoku has been serialized in The Beans since 2003. The individual chapters are collected and published in full novel volumes by Kadokawa Shoten with the first volume released in Japan on October 31, 2003. As of July 2011, 18 volumes have been released for the series. The light novels were released in Taiwan by Taiwan International Kadokawa Bookstore and in South Korea by Seoul Media Group.

No.	Title	Release date	ISBN
1	Hajimari no Kaze wa Akaku (はじまりの風は紅く)	October 31, 2003	4-04-449901-2
2	Ōgon no Yakusoku (黄金の約束)	February 28, 2004	4-04-449902-0
3	Hana wa Murasaki Miya ni Saku (花は紫宮に咲く)	July 31, 2004	4-04-449903-9
4	Omoi wa Haruka naru Chato e (想いは遙かなる茶都へ)	September 30, 2004	4-04-449904-7
5	Shikkoku no Tsuki no Utage (漆黒の月の宴)	March 1, 2005	4-04-449905-5
6	Kake yuku Hakugin no Sunadokei (欠けゆく白銀の砂時計)	July 30, 2005	4-04-449907-1
7	Kokoro wa Ai Yori mo Fukaku (心は藍よりも深く)	September 30, 2005	4-04-449908-X
8	Hikari Furu Heki no Daichi (光降る碧の大地)	February 1, 2006	4-04-449909-8
9	Kōbai wa Yoru ni Kaoru (紅梅は夜に香る)	September 1, 2006	4-04-449911-X
10	Ryokufū wa Ha no Gotoku (緑風は刃のごとく)	October 1, 2006	4-04-449912-8
11	Aoarashi ni Yureru Tsukikusa (青嵐にゆれる月草)	April 1, 2007	978-4-04-449913-6
12	Hakukou wa Ten o Mezasu (白虹は天をめざす)	September 1, 2007	978-4-04-449914-3
13	Reimei ni Kohaku wa Kirameku (黎明に琥珀はきらめく)	May 1, 2008	978-4-04-449916-7
14	Kokuchō wa Ori ni Torawareru (黒蝶は檻にとらわれる)	December 1, 2008	978-4-04-449917-4
15	Kuraki Tasogare no Miya (暗き黄昏の宮)	December 1, 2009	978-4-04-449919-8
16	Aoki Meikyū no Miko (蒼き迷宮の巫女)	April 1, 2010	978-4-04-449920-4
17	Shian no Gyokuza (Jō) (紫闇の玉座（上）)	June 1, 2011	978-4-04-449921-1
18	Shian no Gyokuza (Ge) (紫闇の玉座（下）)	July 1, 2011	978-4-04-449922-8

=== Side stories ===
Sai Yukino has written a series of short side stories for The Story of Saiunkoku which are published in collected volumes by Kadokawa Shoten. The first volume was released in April 2005; the fifth in March 2012.

No.	Title	Release date	ISBN
1	Shu ni Majiwareba Beni (朱にまじわれば紅)	April 28, 2005	4-04-449906-3
2	Ai Yori Dedete Ao (藍より出でて青)	April 1, 2006	4-04-449910-1
3	Tonari no Hyakugō wa Shiro (隣の百合は白)	November 1, 2007	978-4-04-449915-0
4	Kōryō no Yume (黄粱の夢)	May 1, 2009	978-4-04-449918-1
5	Gaikotsu o Kō (骸骨を乞う)	March 26, 2012	978-4-04-110139-1

=== Manga ===
Written by Sai Yukino and illustrated by Kairi Yura, a manga adaptation of The Story of Saiunkoku began serialization in Beans Ace in 2005 where it continues to run. However, on October 9, 2009, the magazine ended its publication and the series continued in Monthly Asuka until 2012. The individual chapters are published in tankōbon volumes by Kadokawa Shoten, with the first released in June 2006. As of April 2012, nine volumes have been released. The series has been licensed by Viz Media for an English release beginning in November 2010.

No.	Original release date	Original ISBN	North America release date	North America ISBN
1	June 26, 2006	4-04-853969-8	November 2, 2010	978-1-4215-3834-1
2	June 26, 2007	978-4-04-854104-6	February 1, 2011	978-1-4215-3835-8
3	May 26, 2008	978-4-04-854178-7	May 3, 2011	978-1-4215-3836-5
4	February 23, 2009	978-4-04-854299-9	August 2, 2011	978-1-4215-3837-2
5	January 26, 2010	978-4-04-854418-4	November 1, 2011	978-1-4215-3842-6
6	October 26, 2010	978-4-04-854544-0	February 7, 2012	978-1-4215-4179-2
7	March 26, 2011	978-4-04-854612-6	May 1, 2012	978-1-4215-4180-8
8	October 26, 2011	978-4-04-854690-4	Oct 2, 2012	978-1-4215-4946-0
9	April 4, 2012	978-4-04-120193-0	April 2, 2013	978-1-4215-5083-1

=== Anime ===
Produced by Madhouse and directed by Jun Shishido, the anime adaptation of The Story of Saiunkoku premiered in Japan on NHK on April 8, 2006. The first season ran for 39 episodes until its conclusion on February 24, 2007. The second season, referred to as Saiunkoku Monogatari 2nd Series, premiered on April 7, 2007, and ran for another 39 episodes until its conclusion on March 8, 2008. The first twelve volumes of the light novel were adapted.

In May 2007, Geneon Entertainment announced it had acquired the license to releases the anime in North America with English language options. In September 2007, after only two volumes had been released, Geneon closed its North America operations. In July 2008, Funimation announced that it would distribute several Geneon titles, including The Story of Saiunkoku. Funimation let the license expire in 2011. In February 2022, the streaming service RetroCrush added the English dub of first season of the anime.

The series uses three pieces of theme music. "Hajimari no Kaze" (はじまりの風; lit. 'Wind of Beginnings') by Ayaka Hirahara is used for the opening theme for both the first and second seasons. For the ending theme, "Saikō no Kataomoi" (最高の片想い; lit. 'The Greatest Unrequited Love') by Sachi Tainaka is used for the first season, while "Asu e" (明日へ; lit. 'To Tomorrow') by Teruya Miho is used for the second season.

=== Soundtracks ===
Three CD soundtracks have been released by Geneon Entertainment for The Story of Saiunkoku, using music from the anime adaptation. The Story of Saiunkoku Original Soundtrack (彩雲国物語 オリジナルサウンドトラック 1) was released on August 4, 2008, containing 38 individual tracks, including the television length opening and ending themes. The second followed on January 12, 2007, with an additional 30 tracks. On December 7, 2007, a third soundtrack, The Story of Saiunkoku Second Series Original Soundtrack (彩雲国物語セカンドシリーズ」オリジナルサウンドトラック), was released containing 23 tracks from the second season of the series. The two series ending themes were released to CD singles on August 30, 2006, and June 6, 2007, respectively. On March 7, 2008, an additional CD soundtrack, Song of Memory was released containing 10 tracks with various character image songs.

=== Drama CDs ===
Three drama CD series have been created around The Story of Saiunkoku. The first series, The Story of Saiunkoku Drama Bangai (彩雲国物語 ドラマ), spanned three volumes and covered the first season of the anime. The first volume was released on September 8, 2006; the second and third volumes followed on November 10, 2006, and March 9, 2007, respectively.

The second series, The Story of Saiunkoku Anime Drama Dai ni Kan (アニメ「彩雲国物語」ドラマCD 第二巻), also spanned three CDs which were released between August 25, 2006, and December 21, 2007.

The final three volume series, The Story of Saiunkoku Second Series Drama Bangai Hen (彩雲国物語セカンドシリーズ ドラマ 番外編), covers events from the second series of the anime. The first volume was released on September 7, 2007, with the remaining volumes following on November 9, 2007, and February 2, 2008.

=== Live-action drama ===
A live action Chinese drama adaptation is set for release in June 2026, streaming on the iQIYI online platform. The drama is known under the names Yúnxiù Xíng (Chinese: 云秀行) and Yúnqǐ Shí (Chinese: 云起时) and is referred to in English as Take Me Where the Clouds Rise or The Legend of Rosy Clouds. Directed by Zhu Shao Jie, the drama will star Li Yitong, Zeng Shunxi, Deng Wei, Dai Lu Wa, Riley Wang, Hongxin Cheng, Tian Jiarui, Jian Yu Xi, Fan Jingwen, and Jerome.D.

=== Other ===
A web-based radio program for the series aired in Japan. Hosted by Tomokazu Seki and Hikaru Midorikawa, the program included mini-stories and special guests discussion the series. The program was released across two CDs in Japan by Geneon Entertainment. The first was released on May 25, 2007, with the first seven broadcasts and a bonus track. The second CD, containing the remaining six broadcasts and a bonus character song, was released on October 24, 2007.

On August 28, 2007, an art book for The Story of Saiunkoku was released in Japan. The Story of Saiunkoku Picture Scroll (彩雲国物語 絵巻, Saiunkoku Monogatari Emaki) included art work from series illustrator Kairi Yura, episode summaries for the first season of the anime adaptation and a bonus short story by author Sai Yukino. A second art book, The Story of Saiunkoku Picture Scroll 2 (彩雲国物語 絵巻, Saiunkoku Monogatari Emaki 2), was released on June 10, 2008, containing more art work for the series, as well as episode summaries from the second anime season and another bonus short story.
