= Shin Megami Tensei: Digital Devil Saga =

2004–2005 role-playing game duology

- European cover art for the first Digital Devil Saga
- Developer: Atlus
- Publishers: JP: Atlus; NA: Atlus USA; EU: Ghostlight
- Directors: Digital Devil Saga: Ichirō Itano; Katsura Hashino; Digital Devil Saga 2: Ichirō Itano; Makoto Kitano
- Producer: Katsura Hashino
- Designer: Makoto Kitano
- Programmer: Satoshi Ōyama
- Artist: Kazuma Kaneko
- Writers: Tadashi Satomi; Yu Godai
- Composer: Shoji Meguro
- Series: Megami Tensei
- Platform: PlayStation 2
- Release: Digital Devil Saga: JP: July 15, 2004; NA: April 5, 2005; EU: July 21, 2006; Digital Devil Saga 2: JP: January 27, 2005; NA: October 3, 2005; EU: February 16, 2007
- Genre: Role-playing
- Mode: Single-player

Shin Megami Tensei: Digital Devil Saga (Note: Digital Devil Saga: Avatar Tuner (Digital Devil Saga アバタール・チューナー, Dejitaru Debiru Sāga Abatāru Chūnā)) is a duology of role-playing video games developed by Atlus for the PlayStation 2. They are a spin-off of the Megami Tensei series. The first Digital Devil Saga was released in Japan in 2004, North America in 2005, and Europe in 2006. Its direct sequel, Shin Megami Tensei: Digital Devil Saga 2, (Note: Digital Devil Saga: Avatar Tuner 2 (Japanese: Digital Devil Saga アバタール・チューナー2, Hepburn: Dejitaru Debiru Sāga Abatāru Chūnā Tsū)) released in 2005 in Japan and North America, and 2007 in Europe and Australasia. The games were published in Europe and Australasia by Ghostlight and in other regions by Atlus and its North American subsidiary Atlus USA.

Digital Devil Saga follows the Embryon, a tribe who fights against five other tribes in a digital world called the Junkyard. After being infected with a demon virus that grants them demonic powers, the Embryon must fight with and devour the other tribes to ascend to "Nirvana". During the conflict, they shelter a woman named Sera, who has the power to calm their demonic powers. In Digital Devil Saga 2, having escaped into the devastated real world, the Embryon are caught up in the fight against the Karma Society, who are intimately linked to the source of the disaster. The gameplay of both titles feature third-person navigation of playable characters around to-scale environments, and turn-based gameplay against demonic monsters and human enemies.

Digital Devil Saga began development pre-2002 under the working title New Goddess. The game's concept and original draft were written by Japanese author Yu Godai, who collaborated with Atlus scriptwriter Tadashi Satomi until withdrawing from the project for health issues. The gameplay concept of characters transforming into demons was based on an unused idea for Shin Megami Tensei. The second game began development immediately after the first, with the main development effort going into refining and improving the gameplay. While their commercial performances varied, both games were heavily praised by critics for their story, graphics and gameplay. Since release, the game has inspired a mobile prequel, and Godai wrote a series of novels based on her original premise for the story.

== Gameplay ==
A battle in Shin Megami Tensei: Digital Devil Saga 2, during the player's turn against the demon Hecatoncheires and displaying the main protagonist's unlocked combo abilities.

In the Shin Megami Tensei: Digital Devil Saga role-playing games, players take control of the characters Serph, Heat, Argilla, Gale and Cielo, with the characters Sera and Roland becoming playable in Digital Devil Saga 2. These characters are able to transform into a demon form, which is their main form in battle. Characters navigate to-scale environments, fighting enemies in both random encounters and story-focused boss battles. After each battle, experience points are awarded to characters. Character abilities are governed by Mantra Grids, a system where Mantras are bought using the in-game currency Macca, then mastering them using Atma Points gained from defeated enemies. The maximum number of abilities that a character can equip at a time is eight. If two or more characters equip a certain ability, they can perform a stronger version of it through a combo. Each character can learn abilities from one of four categories: Physical, Magic, Shield and Auto.

The Digital Devil Saga games use a turn-based battle system, with three allied characters fighting in battle. Both player characters and enemies are governed by a mechanic called the Press Turn system: each character has a symbol representing a turn. The character can pass a half turn to allow the next character an action; turns cannot be passed more than once. If an enemy's weakness is exploited or a character lands a critical hit, an extra turn is gained; if a character resists an attack, a turn is lost. In Digital Devil Saga 2, characters will sometimes enter battle in a half-transformed "berserk" mode, which increases attack power while locking away magic skills and lowering a character's defense. While battle is focused around strengthening characters' demon forms, they can also fight in their human forms using conventional weapons, and can equip ammunition. A human character can perform a combo with one in demon form. The magic system uses nine magic attributes. Ice and Lightning magic have a chance of causing the "freeze" and "stun" status, while Expel magic reduces an enemy's hit points by a certain percentage, and Death magic causes an instant kill. Status magic can inflict status effects on enemies.

Characters gain Karma after a battle is finished, raising their levels. Each time a character's experience level raises, they receive stat boosts. While the protagonist can assign stat points at will, the other main characters each have certain specializations. Money is also dropped, which can be used to buy supplies from merchants. Atma is gained after each battle, but a greater amount is gained from eating enemies. If an enemy is "frightened", the amount of Atma is further increased. Characters can also be afflicted with a status ailment if they overeat. In Digital Devil Saga 2, special Karma Ring items can be assigned to characters to grant stat boosts. Fitting different gems dropped from defeated enemies grant specific stat boosts and effects. Effects range from granting free status buffs on the player party to casting ailments on enemies. Importing save data from the first game enables some skills and abilities learned during the first game to be transferred to the characters that learned them.

== Synopsis ==
=== Setting and characters ===
The first Digital Devil Saga takes place in the Junkyard, a combat simulator program where it always rains. Throughout the story, a conflict takes place between six tribes: the Embryon, Vanguards, Solids, Maribel, Brutes and Wolves and the territories held by them: Muladhara, Svasdhisthana, Anahata, Manipura, Ajna, Vishuddha. The only common ground is a great tower at the Junkyard's center called the Karma Temple in Sahasrara, which acts as a meeting place for all the tribe leaders. The following game is set on Earth, which has been devastated by a phenomenon known as the "Black Sun", a manifestation of God's anger. The survivors of humanity are ruled by the Karma Society.

The main protagonists of the Digital Devil Saga duology are silent protagonist Serph (サーフ, Sāfu), leader of the Embryon; and Sera (セラ), a woman who can commune with God. The other Embryon are the kind Argilla (アルジラ, Arujira); the hot-tempered Heat (ヒート, Hīto) the light-hearted Cielo (シエロ, Shiero); and the highly logical Gale (ゲイル, Geiru). The main antagonist is Angel (エンジェル, Enjeru), who is Sera's intersexual biological parent. In Digital Devil Saga 2, two new main characters are introduced: Roland, the alcoholic leader of the Lokapala resistance group; and Madame Margot Cuvier, head of the Karma Society. All the main characters barring Cuvier become infected with the demon virus, a condition that causes them to turn into demonic beings and lust after human flesh.

=== Plot ===
During a border skirmish between the Embryon and the Vanguards, a demon virus is introduced that infects everyone in the Junkyard: branded with a mark representing their "Atma" and gradually awakening to basic emotions, the people of the Junkyard must devour their foes to satiate their demonic hunger or risk going berserk. Sera, a so-called cyber shaman, arrives suffering from amnesia and is taken in by the Embryon, revealing herself capable of calming their hunger with her singing. The Embryon first become conscious of their new powers when they meet the surviving Vanguards: during their time there, they are forced to kill the Vanguards' leader Harley. Serph is then summoned to the Karma Temple along with the surviving tribe leaders. Once they are assembled there, a female being calling itself Angel orders the tribes to conquer their neighbors and ascend the Temple's tower to "Nirvana", bringing Sera as proof of their achievements. The Embryon decide to ally with the Maribel as a means of defeating the stronger tribes.

After gaining the trust of the Maribel's leader Jinana, they are betrayed by her second-in-command Bat, who allies with the Brutes along with the Solids' leader Mick. Jinana, having refused to eat as she needed to, goes berserk and must be killed. The Solids then capture Sera, leading the Embryon into a fight to the death against Mick. They also successfully trick the Brutes' forces and Bat into a booby-trapped ship, killing them. During this time, the Wolves are subdued by the Brutes, whose leader Varin has awakened memories of a former life where he was known as "Colonel Beck", and unsuccessfully attempted to persuade Angel to release him from the Junkyard. With help from the Wolves' deposed leader Lupa, the Embryon infiltrate the Brutes' castle, but Lupa is killed after going berserk. Later, the Embryon end up fighting Varin, who accuses Sera of being a monster before he dies. Sera regains her memories and runs to the Karma Temple with the Embryon in pursuit. There, Sera faces the human form of Angel, who threatens to delete the Junkyard with a computer virus if Sera does not return to the real world with her. The Embryon arrive and successfully fight Angel, but in the process release the computer virus. The Embryon, Sera and Angel only just escape as the Junkyard is destroyed.

In Digital Devil Saga 2, the Embryon appear in the real world, which is slowly being destroyed by the Black Sun: the only ones able to survive the sun's rays are those infected with the demon virus. Serph, Cielo, Argilla and Gale learn that Sera is the captive of Angel and Madame Cuvier at the Karma Society headquarters. With the help of Roland and a young boy named Fred, the group infiltrate the Karma Society's building. While they attempt to rescue Sera, Angel plans to subvert Cuvier and use the demon virus to create a society ruled by the strong. The Embryon are also faced by Heat, who is working with Cuvier on the promise of Sera's safety. Reaching the EGG, a man-made replica of God, the party rescue Sera, but Heat appears and seems to kill Serph. Both fall into the EGG, and God begins absorbing the Earth's data: in the chaos, Angel kills Cuvier, while the remaining Embryon and Sera, now able to assume a demon form herself, shut down the Power Plant in an unsuccessful attempt to stop the EGG. In the process, both Roland and Argilla are killed by a powerful demon. Returning to the EGG so Sera can speak with God, they are confronted by Heat, who has fused with the EGG and gone berserk. Inside the EGG, Serph is met by a higher being calling itself Schrödinger, who reveals the truth about what happened.

The Karma Society was founded to study God, who was losing faith in humans due to their behavior. Sera was the only survivor of a group of children with the ability to communicate with God. To hide from the pain of the experiments, Sera created an artificial environment populated by benign versions of Karma Society staff: this environment was redesigned to become the Junkyard and the artificial beings would become its five tribes. The original Serph manipulated Sera and his team for his own ends while the original Heat attempted to protect her. When Sera saw Serph killing Heat while linked to the EGG, God felt her pain and attacked Earth. The original Serph was overwhelmed by a flood of data and became a demon before being killed. Now knowing the truth, Serph escapes from the EGG, killing Heat in the process. Sera then decides to head for a secondary Karma facility to communicate with God: on the way, Gale dies while killing Angel, and Cielo sacrifices himself so Sera and Serph can reach the transmission site. As Sera begins transmission, the base is destroyed, killing her and Serph. Their data travels to the sun—the physical manifestation of God—and merges into a new being called Seraph. Aided by the data avatars of the Embryon, Seraph fights God's avatar to prove humanity's worth. Upon victory, Seraph achieves enlightenment and travels with Schrödinger to new worlds, while God restores the sun and Earth. At the game's end, it is shown that the Embryon, Angel, and aspects of Sera and Serph have reincarnated, with a grown Fred acting as their caretaker.

== Development ==
"[Atlus] took the mature storyline and themes from the main SMT games, and applied them to a more fantastic and "mainstream" RPG experience."

— Tomm Hulett, Atlus USA

Production on the initial Digital Devil Saga started prior to the beginning of active development on Shin Megami Tensei III: Nocturne in 2002. During production, it was known under the working title New Goddess. The project was formed in part to make the Megami Tensei series accessible to a broader audience while staying true to its roots. The games were directed by Katsura Hashino, a new director who had worked in lesser roles in previous Megami Tensei titles. The design director was Makoto Kitano, while the movie director was Ichiroh Itano, a noted anime director. Itano was responsible for storyboarding and character movement choreography. The team was divided into multiple divisions, each in charge of different aspects of the game's design. The battle system was taken from that used in Nocturne, but with elements added to both differentiate it from other Megami Tensei games and incorporate the game's themes. During development of Digital Devil Saga, the team were faced with repeated problems with fitting the entire experience on a single DVD: the amount of data was estimated to be two times that of Nocturne.

The original story was written by Japanese novelist Yu Godai. She was contacted in 2000 by Atlus through her then-publisher Kadokawa Shoten about collaborating on a video game scenario, something entirely new to her. Her submitted proposal for Digital Devil Saga was accepted, and she temporarily moved to Tokyo to work with Atlus on refining the project. During her time on the project, she collaborated with Tadashi Satomi, who had previously written scripts for the first three Persona games. Godai wrote her outline on the basis that both books and video games had stories broken into chapters, writing up the story up to the first boss battle in short story form to get a sense of the narrative and lore. Ultimately, due to a number of factors including health problems and disliking living in Tokyo, Godai left the project. Satomi's role as story writer for the duology necessitated discussions with other teams assigned to the game. Due to characters having dialogue in the field, the team needed to have extensive notes prepared.

Production of Digital Devil Saga 2 began immediately after the release of the first game. To tease it prior to its official announcement, a large number of unfinished plot threads and vague hints relating to the main characters' previous lives were incorporated into the first game. For Digital Devil Saga 2, the team expanded upon the systems implemented in the first game. Due to extra features added, the team sometimes felt that they could not fit it all on a single disc. The main priority was to ensure smooth motion and a quick transfer into battles and cutscenes. The game's setting was inspired in Satomi's mind by the frequent reporting of natural disasters and outbreaks of diseases around the world. Another theme he incorporated was the inherent contradiction of wanting to avoid violence while being forced to fight others in order to survive. According to Satomi, while the first game's motif was "rain", the second game's was "sun". Itano returned to his role as storyboarder and movement choreographer. A large amount of work was done to refine the gameplay experience, such as opening up the character customization system. The team used player feedback from the first game's systems to make their adjustments. For both games, Atlus received additional development support for artwork assets from Kusanagi Corporation.

=== Character design ===
The character and demon designs were done by regular series artist Kazuma Kaneko. At the start, Kaneko was given the instruction to give the characters tribal uniforms instead of normal clothes, and an Atma tattoo somewhere on their body to signify their demon power. The uniforms signified their eternal conflict within the Junkyard. To help bring individuality to the main characters, Kaneko create slight variations in them, such as giving them hoods or capes. The grey tribal uniforms were created so the main characters' key colors would stand out. Serph, as the player character and silent protagonist, was given few personality traits and designed with a stern expression. The aspect that separated him from other silent protagonist within the Megami Tensei series was that his name was spoken by the other characters rather than chosen by the player. To emphasize the fact that the world of Digital Devil Saga was unlike the typical setting for Megami Tensei titles, he gave all the characters hair and eye colors that would be naturally impossible in the real world. The only one not to have a strange hair color was Sera, signifying her unique status. The characters' demon forms were designed to be animal-like, signifying their urge to eat. They were given prominent mouths as demons, as the idea was that they would eat their foes when in demon form. Their eyes were removed as they stood out too much. Each character was designed around a specific elemental theme, which both flowed into the gameplay and matched an individual's personality: an example of this is Heat, who has an angry personality and uses Fire as his primary element.

Kaneko was the first to propose the game's concept, which was then worked on by other staff members. The initial game's themes were defined as "awakening" and "change", referenced in how the characters gradually awoke to their emotions and the static environment of the Junkyard was drastically changed. The Junkyard was designed to emphasize the desperation of the characters during their awakening. The concept behind the demon transformations originated during the development of Shin Megami Tensei. Kaneko, who worked on Shin Megami Tensei, had wanted the game's Chaos Hero to regularly switch between his human and demon forms. The idea did not appear in the finished game, but eventually reemerged and became the base for Digital Devil Saga's gameplay. The game's character models were created based on development knowledge from Nocturne. Creating the models proved difficult due to the need to extensively use level of detail while staying true to Kaneko's distinctive designs. While Nocturne was defined by its "static" feel, the team wanted Digital Devil Saga to have a feeling of motion to contrast Nocturne. Makoto Kitano was responsible for creating 3D representations of the game's demons, A noted element was the design of Cerberus, which combined elements of the three-headed version first designed for Devil Summoner: Soul Hackers and the shape of sharks. One of the additional challenges was that it was the first Megami Tensei title to feature extensive voice acting, inspired by the need to fully express the game's themes and story. Before the official voice actors were cast, Atlus staff provided the characters' voices. Due to the wish to appeal to a wider audience than previous Megami Tensei games, the proposed amount of violence and graphic imagery was cut down.

=== Music ===
The music for Digital Devil Saga was composed by Shoji Meguro, who had previously worked on multiple Megami Tensei games, with some additional tracks for the first game being written by Kenichi Tsuchiya. While he had previously been restricted in his music quality by the limited storage space of the CD medium, Meguro was able to play half the tracks using real-time streaming. Using the software, Meguro was able to fit in high-quality music alongside the sound effects and voice track. Nevertheless, he needed to make some compromises on tracks.

For the first game, Meguro made heavy use of guitar-based rock music, taking his inspiration from music of the 1960s and 70s. It was meant to represent the vicious new nature of the environment, and of how the main protagonists gradually awoke to their humanity. Tsuchiya was in charge of environmental tracks that deviated from the normal layout and feel of the Junkyard. The game's battle theme, "Hunting", was originally going to be the boss theme, but its instrumentation was considered to be wrong and so it was changed to the normal battle theme, instead "Big Battle" was made the boss theme. For the second game, Meguro changed the original's dark tone to give it a harsher feel and techno instrumentation, reflecting the state of the real world and clashing with the views of the main characters. He also reached out to an external firm to help with fitting in more complicated tracks with less loops, getting around some of the limitations he faced with the first game.

Multiple theme songs were created for the games. The first game's opening theme, "Pray", was sung by Sera's voice actress Houko Kuwashima. "Pray" also formed the core musical theme for the games. For the North American version, the opening theme was changed to "Danger", composed by electronic band Etro Anime. The song, described as a "melancholy track", was designed to blend with the constant rain of the Junkyard. The opening theme for Digital Devil Saga 2 was "Alive": it was written by Meguro, sung by Kayoko Momota, and had backing vocals by Yumi Kawamura. The ending theme song is "Time Capsule" by Japanese singer-songwriter As. The song was used in television commercials advertising the game in Japan, and was the singer's debut single. The soundtracks for both games were released in 2005 as "Digital Devil Saga: Avatar Tuner 1 & 2 Original Sound Track: Integral", a streaming version of the same was released on 20th anniversary of the game series in July 2024.

== Release ==
Digital Devil Saga was first announced in the Japanese director's cut version of Nocturne in February 2004. The game's formal title had only been decided upon shortly before its reveal. As part of the game's promotion in Japan, entertainer and model Mayuko Iwasa appeared in live-action advertisements in the role of Sera, and promoted the game at events. An eight-megabyte PlayStation 2 memory card was sold that featured artwork of Serph and his demon form. Digital Devil Saga 2 was officially announced at the 2004 Tokyo Game Show. To promote Digital Devil Saga 2, a special DVD containing selected music tracks and movie material was created as an over-the-counter giveaway for the initial print of the game. Both Digital Devil Saga games were re-released by Atlus in 2006 as part of their "Atlus Best Collection" budget release series.

Digital Devil Saga was officially announced for the west at the 2004 Electronic Entertainment Expo for release in the winter of that year. It was subsequently delayed into 2005, and a deluxe edition which would include a box for containing both Digital Devil Saga games was announced as a consolation. The second game's release window was officially announced at the 2005 Electronic Entertainment Expo, to be published in North America by Atlus USA. The game arrived in stores in North America a week earlier than originally scheduled. Both Digital Devil Saga games were published in Europe by Ghostlight.

As the original version featured a cast of well-known anime voice actors, the Atlus USA localization team sought out well-known English voice actors for the dub, and took extra care with syncing the English dialogue with the original characters' lip movements. Digital Devil Saga was the first Megami Tensei project to feature an extensive voice acting element. During localization, localization project manager Yu Namba made a spelling error during one of the early cutscenes where the name of Serph's demon form was shown: the demon's name was displayed as "Varna", when it was actually "Varuna". The error was not spotted until it was too late, and so remained in the game. One of the main concerns was to keep the characters' personalities intact when shifting from Japanese to English dialogue: a cited example of how this change was accomplished was Cielo, who was given a Jamaican accent to express the character's easy-going and friendly personality. After the release of Nocturne, the "Shin Megami Tensei" moniker was attached to the Digital Devil Saga games to help with marketing.

== Reception ==
Reception

Aggregate scores
| Aggregator | Score |
|---|---|
| GameRankings | 80% (DDS); 83% (DDS2) |
| Metacritic | 78/100 (DDS); 82/100 (DDS2) |

Review scores
| Publication | Score |
|---|---|
| 1Up.com | B+ (DDS); B+ (DDS2) |
| Eurogamer | 8/10 (DDS); 9/10 (DDS2) |
| Famitsu | 34/40 (DDS); 34/40 (DDS2) |
| GameSpot | 8.2/10 (DDS); 8.3/10 (DDS2) |
| IGN | 7.8/10 (DDS) |
| RPGamer | 3.5/5 (DDS); 4/5 (DDS2) |
| RPGFan | 93% (DDS); 99% (DDS2) |

By the end of 2004, the first game sold 153,421 units in Japan, coming in at the 81st best-selling title in Japan for that year. The second game sold 90,812 units in Japan by the end of 2005, becoming the 144th best-selling game for 2005. Digital Devil Saga did not manage to meet its projected sales targets in Japan, and contributed to the company's console division posting a substantial loss for the 2004/2005 financial year, resulting in several staff members being laid off. According to a representative of Atlus USA, the games' sales performances in 2005 were "absolutely fabulous". In Europe, it was stated by its publisher that the first game had sold above expectations in the region. Speaking in 2013, a Ghostlight representative said that the Digital Devil Saga duology had "met with great success" in Europe. Upon their re-release on PlayStation Network, the games appeared in the top ten rankings in North America and Europe.

Digital Devil Saga received positive critical reception: aggregate sites GameRankings and Metacritic show ratings of 80% and 78/100 respectively. General praise went to the story, characters and gameplay. The high difficulty, issues with repetition and pacing, and the cliffhanger ending drew criticism. Famitsu cited the game's significant shift away from the hardcore mechanics of the main series, positively noting the freedom of character customization. The reviewer for 1UP.com, despite missing the demon fusion systems from earlier Megami Tensei titles, thoroughly enjoyed the game, calling it "a great Final Fantasy alternative". Jeremy Dunham of IGN said that "Despite its repetition and unfinished storyline, [Digital Devil Saga] still has plenty to like", citing its plot and battle system. GameSpot's Bethany Massimilla said that Digital Devil Saga's combat and world design made it a compelling title worthy of the Shin Megami Tensei moniker. RPGamer's Derek Cavin said that Digital Devil Saga "manages to be a good game, despite its flaws". Eurogamer's Rob Fahey said that players expecting a traditional role-playing game would be disappointed, while stating that Digital Devil Saga delivered a generally positive impression while avoiding many cliches of the RPG genre. John McCarroll of RPGFan generally enjoyed his time with the game despite issues with camera control, praising the positive mixture of gameplay and story elements.

Digital Devil Saga 2 received an even better reception: its aggregate scores from GameRankings and Metacritic were 83% and 83/100 respectively. While critics generally cited a necessity for knowledge of the first game, the story and gameplay were generally cited as an improvement over the original. Famitsu was again fairly positive, enjoying the story and characters, while also noting the accommodations for first-time players. Dengeki PlayStation was highly positive about the game, praising its story and gameplay additions, though saying that the two games were a little too similar, and that people who had not played the first game would be confused by the story and character relations. 1UP.com's Shane Bettenhausen said that while the game shared many similarities with its predecessor, it was not as repetitive as other games such as the .hack series, and was still a good game. Masimilla said that Digital Devil Saga 2 had managed to realize the first game's storytelling ambitions, enjoying the experience despite noting some design flaws. Fahey said that the game was "everything that an excellent sequel should be", generally praising its mechanical and narrative improvements over Digital Devil Saga. Cavin said that it improved on nearly every aspect of the original game, recommending it to players of RPGs. McCarroll said "[Digital Devil Saga 2] is easily the finest game I've had a chance to play this year and stands to be one of the great games of this generation".

== Legacy ==
In its reviews, RPGFan named both Digital Devil Saga games as "Editor's Choice". In 2011, Digital Devil Saga and its sequel Digital Devil Saga 2 ended up topping the site's "Top 20 RPGs of the Last Decade" list. Kurt Kalata, writing for 1UP.com in an article concerning the controversial content of the Megami Tensei series, made mention of Digital Devil Saga due to its examination of the ethics of eating others to survive.

A manga spin-off of Digital Devil Saga titled Digital Devil Saga: Avatar Tuner - Shinen no Matou was published in Japan in 2005 by Jive. The manga revolves around a separate group of characters within the Junkyard. A five-volume light novels series titled Quantum Devil Saga: Avatar Tuner have been authored by Yu Godai in 2011. While she had left the project early, her contract with Atlus enabled her to write her own work based on the premise. The novels are Yu's alternate take on her own story, redone without any of the restrictions involved with a video game narrative.

Digital Devil Saga: Avatar Tuner: A's TEST Server, a mobile role-playing game, was developed by Interactive Brains for mobile phones and published by Atlus and Bbmf through the Megaten α service. Using gameplay systems similar to the console games, the story is an original narrative set within the Digital Devil Saga universe: when Serph awakens in an enormous tower with no memories, he and the other Embryon must explore the towers with Sera's help to recover his memories.
