= SB Creative =

Japanese publishing company

SB Creative Corp.
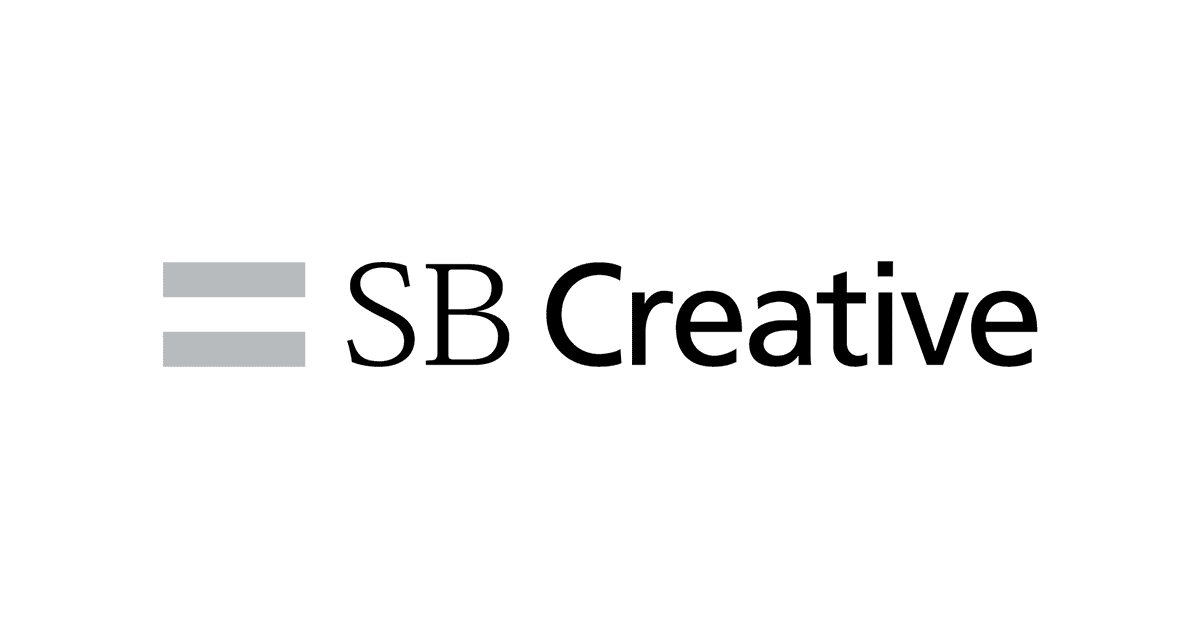

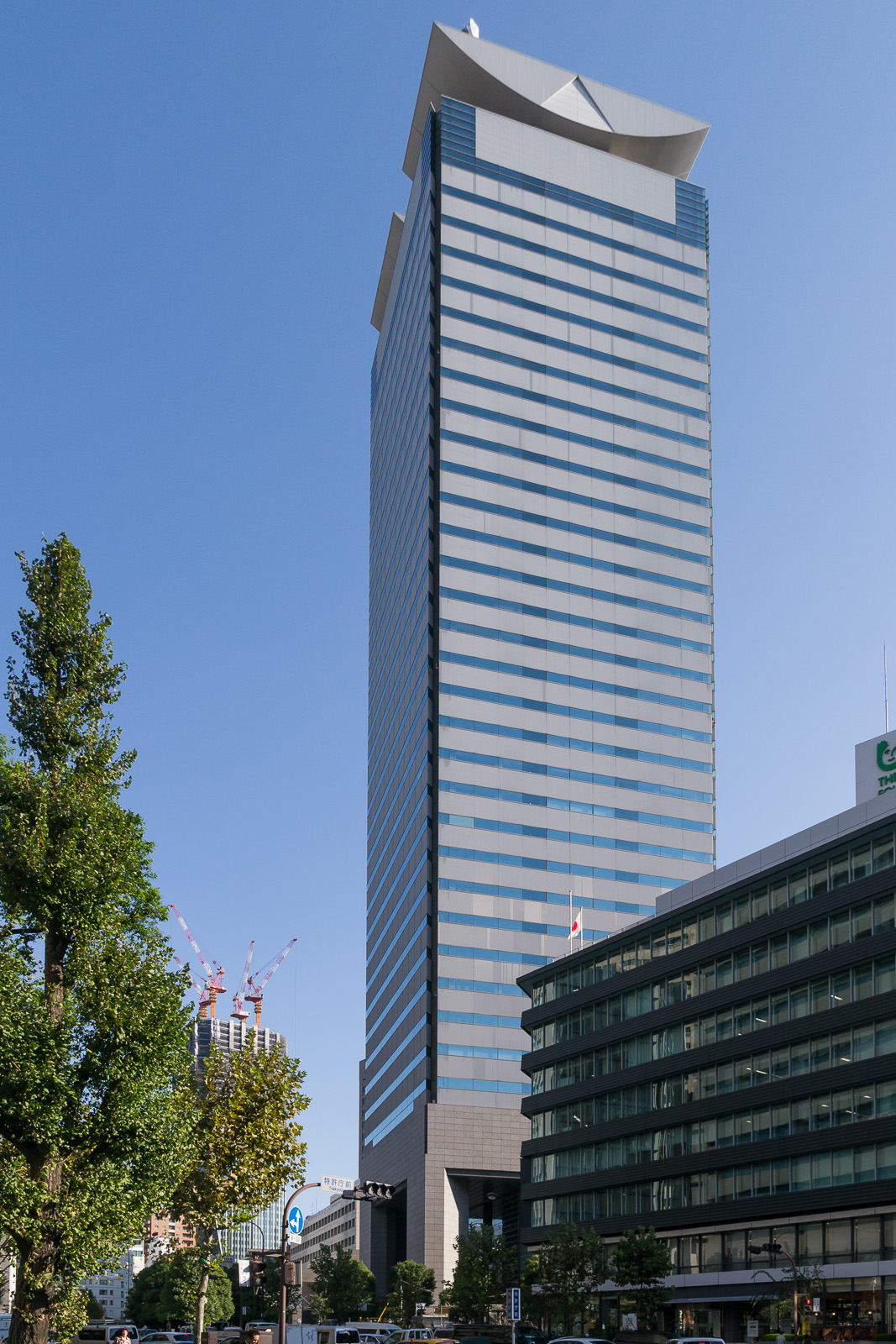
- Headquarters in Minato, Tokyo
- Native name: SBクリエイティブ株式会社
- Romanized name: Esubī Kurieitibu Kabushiki gaisha
- Type: Kabushiki gaisha
- Industry: Books, Light Novels
- Founded: March 24, 1999; 27 years ago
- Headquarters: Toranomon, Minato, Tokyo, Japan
- Key people: Kosei Tsuchihashi (President and CEO)
- Net income: 716,191,000 yen (2022)
- Total assets: 14,859,245,000 yen (2022)
- Number of employees: 246 (2022)
- Parent: SoftBank
- Website: www.softbankcr.co.jp

SB Creative Corp. (SBクリエイティブ株式会社, Esubī Kurieitibu Kabushiki gaisha) is a Japanese publishing company and a subsidiary of the SoftBank telecommunications company. It was founded in 1999 and is headquartered in Tokyo, Japan.

== Publications ==
Young Adult

- 数学ガール

Original Japanese language publication of the Math Girls series.

== Light novel imprints ==
- GA Bunko
- GA Novel
