= Kaze Hikaru =

Japanese manga series

- First tankōbon volume cover, featuring Tominaga Sei and Okita Sōji

風光る
- Genre: Drama; Historical; Romance
- Manga
- Written by: Taeko Watanabe
- Published by: Shogakukan
- English publisher: NA: Viz Media
- Imprint: Flower Comics
- Magazine: Bessatsu Shōjo Comic; (1997–2002); Monthly Flowers; (2002–2020)
- English magazine: NA: Shojo Beat
- Original run: 1997 – 2020
- Volumes: 45
- Audio drama
- Produced by: Blue Planet
- Written by: Azuki Mashiba
- Music by: Koichiro Kameyama
- Original run: December 22, 2001 – August 6, 2004
- Manga

Ōedo Shinsengumi! Kaze Hikaru Anazā Wārudo
- Written by: Taeko Watanabe
- Published by: Shogakukan
- Magazine: Monthly Flowers
- Published: November 27, 2020

Kaze Hikaru (Japanese: 風光る) (Note: This phrase refers to spring, when there is supposed to be a lot of wind (風) and sunlight (光).) is a Japanese manga series written and illustrated by Taeko Watanabe. Set in the bakumatsu period, the story follows Tominaga Sei, a young girl who poses as a boy named Kamiya Seizaburō so she can join the Mibu-Roshi (Special Police; later known as the Shinsengumi). She befriends her sensei, Okita Sōji, who discovers her secret.

The manga was initially serialized in Shōgakukan's Bessatsu Shōjo Comic magazine beginning in 1997. It transferred to Monthly Flowers magazine in 2002, concluding in May 2020. Shōgakukan collected the individual chapters into 45 tankōbon volumes published under its Flower Comics imprint. Watanabe also penned a spin-off chapter, Ōedo Shinsengumi! Kaze Hikaru Anazā Wārudo (大江戸新選組！風光るアナザーワールド), published in Monthly Flowers magazine in November 2020. In North America, Kaze Hikaru is licensed in English by Viz Media, originally serialized in their Shojo Beat magazine from July 2005 to September 2006 and currently published in print and digital volumes.

In 2003, Kaze Hikaru received the 48th Shogakukan Manga Award for the shōjo category. The series has been well received by manga critics, who praised its historical background, art, and characters. It has sold over six million copies and has been named among the best-selling weekly manga series several times in Japan.

== Plot ==
Kaze Hikaru takes place in the 1860s—in the Japanese historical period known as bakumatsu—and revolves around a girl named Tominaga Sei who joins the Mibu-Roshi (Special Police; later known as the Shinsengumi). She disguises herself as a boy by shaving her hair and joins the group using the name Kamiya Seizaburō. Her primary goal is to seek revenge against the Chōshū clan, who are responsible for the murder of her brother and father. Over the course of the series, Sei realizes that she has found a new family within the Shinsengumi troupe.

== Characters ==
The characters' names are written in the Japanese name order (i.e., family name first, given name second).

Tominaga Sei (富永 セイ)
Voiced by: Noriko Hidaka
Sei poses as a boy named Kamiya Seizaburō (神谷清三郎) and joins the Mibu-Roshi (later renamed Shinsengumi) to avenge the deaths of her father and older brother by the Chōshū clan. Her true sex is discovered by Okita, who promises to keep it a secret, and she eventually develops feelings for him. She intended to leave the Shinsengumi after fulfilling her revenge, but she decides to stay with the group when she realizes what it means to be a follower of the bushidō code; to have something to protect at all costs. She says the main reason for staying with the Shinsengumi and remaining on the path of a samurai is because she would rather fight by Okita's side than stay at home praying for his safety. Sei's motivation to protect Okita becomes a powerful force during the Ikedaya Affair, when she turns into a formidable warrior after Okita is downed in battle. Because of Kamiya's looks, "he" is later sent to work as a spy for the Shinengumi.^{[vol. 21]}
Okita Sōji (沖田 総司)
Voiced by: Yōji Matsuda
A genius swordsman and officer of the Shinsengumi. He has strong bonds with Kondō—who raised Okita from the age of nine after Okita's mother and siblings could no longer afford to care for him, and Hijikata—whom he loves and respects like a brother. He is the first person to discover Sei's true identity and he is her main confidant on matters relating to it. He wanted her to go back to a normal girl's life after she had gotten her revenge because of the brutality of the life of a samurai. After the Ikedaya Affair, he admits he has affection for Sei as if she were his own kin. Over a year after those events, he realizes he is in love with her. When he was 17 years old, a woman he rejected attempted suicide in front of him and Okita came to the conclusion that falling in love was not worth such pain; he has kept his distance from women ever since. Another hindrance to romance is that he has dedicated his life to the path of the samurai and has vowed to himself that he will never marry. The character is based on the historical figure Okita Sōji.
Hijikata Toshizō (土方 歳三)
Voiced by: Takaya Kamikawa
The Shinsengumi's vice-commander, who is known to many as a cruel and strict taskmaster with a high standard of morals. However, that is a facade; Toshizō has to be the devil's advocate because of his best friend Kondō Isami's inability to mete out discipline. Therefore, Hijikata plays the "bad guy" to maintain order. Hijikata's softer side is his love of poetry, which is evident in a book filled with his haiku. He is incredibly self-conscious about his poetry and he initially tried to hide it from everyone. Despite his harsh personality, he is actually shy and cares deeply for the people around him. Hijikata often argues with Sei; Okita has said that Hijikata and Sei have similar personalities when they are angry, something neither of them is willing to acknowledge. Sei often refers to Hijikata as the "oni vice commander". The character is based on the historical figure Hijikata Toshizō.
Kondō Isami (近藤 勇)
Voiced by: Tōru Ōkawa
The leader of the Shinsengumi. He is a kind, gentle man who cares about every member of the Shinsengumi. He is a natural leader and is devoted to his cause. However, because of his kindheartedness, he is not particularly suited to discipline, which Hijitaka often dispenses in his place. Kondō's mother died when he was young and he was raised by his father and brothers. Kondō was adopted into another family at the age of 16. Kondō met Okita when Okita was sent to live in his household at the age of nine because his family could no longer care for him. Kondō recognized and understood the young boy's discomfort and insecurity at living with a new family and welcomed him warmly. He served as Okita's mentor and older brother; at times, he took on the role of father as Okita grew up. Okita is grateful to him and is extremely loyal to the point of vowing that he would commit seppuku should Kondō die. Kondō is fond of Kamiya (Sei) and recognizes her great ability as a member of the Shinsengumi. The character is based on the historical figure Kondō Isami.
Saitō Hajime (斎藤 一)
Voiced by: Tomokazu Seki
Saitō is level-headed and mature; his combat skills rival those of Okita. He sometimes serves as a spy or scout, gathering information for the Shinsengumi. Since he has an uncanny resemblance to Sei's deceased brother, she sometimes addresses him as aniue, a respectful term for an older brother. Coincidentally, Saitō trained alongside and became friends with Sai's brother during their apprenticeship days. He quickly grows fond of Sei and becomes a silent protector, willing to listen to her worries or to console her, and often watches out for her in case she runs into trouble. Saito's personality appears to others as laconic, bland, and very serious, but he has a dry sense of humor that tends to come out around Okita. Saitō also has a more hysterical side that appears in his relationship with Sei. Although he is unsure of Sei's sex, he eventually realizes he is in love with her, which greatly confuses him. The character is based on the historical figure Saitō Hajime.

== Media ==
=== Manga ===
Written and illustrated by Taeko Watanabe, Kaze Hikaru began its serialization in Shogakukan's Bessatsu Shōjo Comic magazine in 1997. It transferred to Shogakukan's Monthly Flowers magazine in 2002, concluding in the July 2020 issue on May 28, 2020. The manga's first tankōbon (collected volume) was released by Shogakukan on October 25, 1997, and its 45th and final volume was released on February 25, 2021. Shogakukan also published the series in bunkoban format, starting on November 15, 2007; it lasted for twelve volumes total, with the final volume released on September 15, 2011. Following the end of the manga series, Watanabe published an additional spin-off chapter titled Ōedo Shinsengumi! Kaze Hikaru Anazā Wārudo (大江戸新選組！風光るアナザーワールド) in the January 2021 issue of Monthly Flowers on November 27, 2020.

To accompany the manga series, Shogakukan published a guidebook titled Kaze Hikaru: Kyōto (風光る京都) on December 12, 2001, and an artbook titled Kaze Hikaru Gashū: Hanagatari (風光る画集 花がたり) on March 26, 2008. Shogakukan published a second and final guidebook titled Kaze Hikaru: Kikō (風光る紀行) on February 25, 2021.

In North America, Viz Media acquired the series rights and published the manga in its female-targeted magazine Shojo Beat, from the first issue in July 2005 until September 2006. Later, it was published in the tankōbon format; the first volume was released on January 3, 2006, and the latest—the 29th—was released on August 3, 2021. Viz Media also licensed a digital version of the manga, starting from June 18, 2013. The manga has also been licensed in Indonesia by Elex Media Komputindo, in South Korea by Haksan Culture Company, in Taiwan by Chingwin Publishing Group, and in Vietnam by NXB Trẻ.

=== Drama CDs ===
Kaze Hikaru was adapted into three drama CDs which were produced by Blue Planet in Japan. The first drama CD was released on December 22, 2001, the second was released on October 24, 2003, and the third was released on August 6, 2004. The scripts were written by Azuki Mashiba, and the musical score was composed by Koichiro Kameyama. All three drama CDs starred Noriko Hidaka as Tominaga Sei, Yōji Matsuda as Okita Sōji, Tomokazu Seki as Saitō Hajime and Tominaga Yuuma, Takaya Kamikawa as Hijikata Toshizō, and Tōru Ōkawa as Kondō Isami. The majority of the cast was composed of actors from the theater group Caramel Box.

== Reception ==
Along with Nana, Kaze Hikaru won the 48th Shogakukan Manga Award for the shōjo category in 2003. It was also recommended by the jury of the 7th Japan Media Arts Festival's manga division. Individual volumes of Kaze Hikaru have been ranked in listings of best-selling manga of the week in Japan; the entire series has sold over six million copies in Japan after the release of the 35th volume in March 2014.

Writing for Manga Life, Ryan Lewis described Kaze Hikaru as "a unique title", praising its engaging story, plot, and characters. Comics Village's Lori Henderson described the manga as "an enjoyable read", and said it is interesting because it shows the history and culture during the Shogunate. It was elected one of the "Most Underrated" manga along with Maoh: Juvenile Remix and Saturn Apartments; Eva Volin stated that despite the necessity for the reader to know something about that period of Japanese history, the reader will "fall in love" with the characters "as they deal with the fall of the samurai way and the rise of modern warfare". Pop Culture Shock's reviewer Katherine Dacey described Kaze Hikaru as "an action-filled drama in the vein of The Rose of Versailles or They Were Eleven", and she praised the political nature of the series because Watanabe discusses the gender constraints in Japan. Reviewing the ninth volume, Isaac Hale, also from Pop Culture Shock, commended the series for keeping the same humor that it had at the beginning. Hale said the art was a "high point" of the manga; he described the character designs as "attractive and unique". Matthew Alexander from Mania appreciated the story's historical setting and the theme of "a woman in a man's world."

According to Anime News Network's Rebecca Silverman, one of the strengths of Kaze Hikaru is "the meticulous research and fidelity to history that Taeko Watanabe maintains". Silverman praised the manga for being "[r]ich with detail but never overwhelming and full of likeable characters", and said that "this is a manga that goes beyond the norm to bring us a story that we can really sink our teeth into". Holly Ellingwood from Active Anime compared the manga to Rurouni Kenshin and Peacemaker Kurogane, and lauded the series for showing the reader the reality of that historical period. Leroy Douresseaux from Comic Book Bin described it as "James Clavell meets Colleen McCullough", and praised Watanabe's artwork, which he said creates "expressive characters and Oscar-worthy costume design". Douresseaux also said the faces of Watanabe's characters "are so captivating that they have a hypnotic effect on the reader", and that it is impossible to not love them. Sheena McNeil of Sequential Tart called Kaze Hikaru a "fantastic read for any genre", praising its strong female lead, romance, art and comedy. Later, it compared Kaze Hikaru with a novel, and praised the fact that each character has an important role in the series. In a review of volume 12, Patti Martinson mentioned the series for being "soap opera-ish", and said she was still enjoying the characters and the plot. Two volumes later, Holly von Winckel described the manga's male characters looking like women. Marissa Sammy said the 15th volume was "far richer in plot and appeal" than earlier volumes. Wolfen Moondaughter said that when reading the 18th volume, she felt she was reading three volumes, and that there was "a lot packed into this manga".
