= Taeko Watanabe =

Japanese manga artist

Taeko Watanabe 渡辺 多恵子
- Born: August 29, 1960 (age 66) Shinagawa, Tokyo, Japan
- Area: Manga artist
- Notable works: Family!; Hajime-chan ga Ichiban!; Kaze Hikaru
- Awards: Japan Cartoonists Association Award (1987), Shogakukan Manga Award (1991, 2003)

Taeko Watanabe (渡辺 多恵子, Watanabe Taeko; born August 29, 1960, in Shinagawa, Tokyo) is a Japanese manga artist. She made her professional debut in 1979 with the short story Waka-chan no Netsuai Jidai (和佳ちゃんの熱愛時代; "Love Struck Days of Waka"). In 1987, she won the Excellence Award at the 16th Japan Cartoonists Association Awards for her comedy series St. 14 Graffiti. She has twice received the Shogakukan Manga Award in the shōjo category: in 1991 for Hajime-chan ga Ichiban! and in 2003 for Kaze Hikaru.

== Works ==
=== Series ===
- Family! (ファミリー！), serialized in Bessatsu Shōjo Comic (1981–1985)
- St. 14 Graffiti (聖14グラフィティ), serialized in Bessatsu Shōjo Comic (1986–1987) (Note: On the cover of the manga's first compiled volume, the title is written in Japanese as 「聖14グラフィティ」, with furigana clarifying that 「聖」 is meant to be read as the English word "saint" (セント, sento) and "14" is meant to be read as the English word "fourteen" (フォーティーン, fōtīn). Shogakukan rendered the title in English as "St. 14 Graffiti" on telephone cards and other merchandise sold in Japan.)
- Hajime-chan ga Ichiban! (はじめちゃんが一番!), serialized in Bessatsu Shōjo Comic (1988–1995)
- Mune no Kin'iro (胸の金色), serialized in Bessatsu Shōjo Comic (1996)
- Kaze Hikaru (風光る), serialized in Bessatsu Shōjo Comic and Monthly Flowers (1997–2020)

=== Art books ===
- Idol de Ikō!: Hajime-chan ga Ichiban! Special (アイドルで行こう！はじめちゃんが一番！SPECIAL), published by Shogakukan (1995)
- Hanagatari: Kaze Hikaru Gashū (花がたり 風光る画集), published by Shogakukan (2008)
