= Yu Godai =

Japanese writer from Nara Prefecture (born 1970)

Yu Godai (五代 ゆう Godai Yū, born August 7, 1970) is a Japanese writer from Nara Prefecture. Her father was a Japanese language teacher at Todaiji Gakunen middle school and high school.

While Godai was still a university student her The Story of the Beginning of Bone was selected for the fourth annual Fantasy Novel Prize, which was sponsored by the Japanese publisher Fujimi Shobo. Godai was the first person to receive the grand prize. Before this novel was published, Godai made her debut with the story "Capital of Kyoshin", which appeared in the monthly Dragon Magazine.

Godai was contracted by Atlus for drafting the story of Shin Megami Tensei: Digital Devil Saga video game series. She left the project partway due to health issues but held the contract right to publish her own version of the novel based on the setting of the game, which later became the Quantum Devil Saga series.

== Major works ==
- Hajimari no Hone no Monogatari (Fujimi Fantashi Bunko 1993/ Reissue HJ Bunko 2006)
- Seimeikiden (Kadokawa Horror Bunko, 2003)
- Glass no Bara (Kadokawa Horror Bunko, 2003)
- Quantum Devil Saga (Hayakawa Bunko, 2011)
- Paracelsus no Musume Series (MF Bunko J, 2012)

== Translations ==
- Avatar Tuner, Vol. 1 (Bento Books, 2014)
