= Chingwin Publishing Group =

Taiwanese publishing group

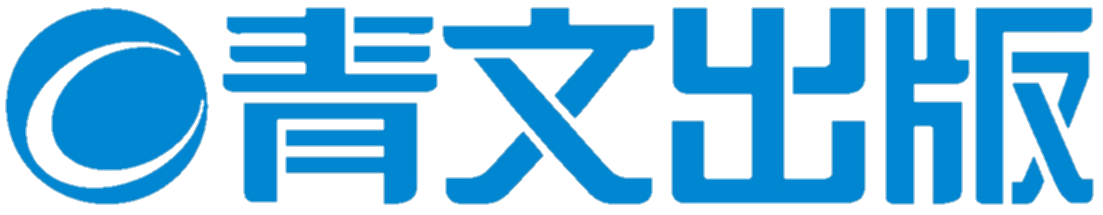
- Chingwin's current logo
- Native name: 青文出版社股份有限公司
- Industry: Publishing
- Founded: 1964
- Headquarters: Taiwan
- Products: Magazines, manga, picture books, light novels, and other books
- Website: www.ching-win.com.tw

Ching Win Publishing Co., Ltd. (Chinese: 青文出版社股份有限公司; pinyin: Qīngwén Chūbǎn Shè Gǔfèn Yǒuxiàn Gōngsī) is a Taiwanese publishing group known for its large manga selection, established 1964 in Taipei. Though it was initially aimed as general publishing company, it changed its principle to mainly publishing manga, light novels and pop culture magazines during the 1990s. In addition to translating Japanese manga and light novels, it also supports local Taiwanese authors as well.

== Publications ==
Manga Magazines

- 快樂快樂

Translated version of CoroCoro Comic (Shogakukan). But it also contents many manga from Shueisha and Kodansha along with some South Korean manhwa.

- 元氣少年

Translated version of Shōnen Sunday (Shogakukan). Monthly.

- Alice少女流行漫畫誌

Translated version of Bessatsu Friend (Shogakukan). Monthly.

- CHING WIN BOY COMIC

Monthly Shounen manga magazine.

Other Magazines
Many localized versions of Japanese magazines are released by Chingwin Publishing Group.

- Famitsu (Enterbrain)
- Dengeki Hobby Magazine (MediaWorks)
- With (Kodansha)
- Vivi (Kodansha)
- Cawaii! (Shufunotomosha)

Light Novels

- Elite Novels 菁英文庫

Translated versions of Super Dash Bunko and Cobalt Bunko from Shueisha.

== See also ==
- List of companies of Taiwan
