= Light novel =

Popular type of Japanese literature genre

A light novel (Japanese: ライトノベル, Hepburn: raito noberu) is a type of popular literature novel from Japan usually classified as young adult fiction, generally targeting teens to twenties or older. The definition is very vague and wide-ranging, but it generally refers to a story accompanied with manga-style illustrations, often in black and white.

"Raito noberu" is the wasei-eigo from "light novel" and its abbreviation is the clipped compound ranobe (ラノベ) or, in English, LN.

Light novels are published in the bunkobon format (A6, 10.5 cm × 14.8 cm [4.1 in × 5.8 in]). They are subject to dense publishing schedules, with new installments being published in three-to-nine-month intervals.

Light novels are often adapted into manga and anime. Whilst most light novels are published only as books, some have their chapters first serialized monthly in anthology magazines or via the Internet as web novels before being collected and compiled into book format, similar to how manga is published.

== Details ==
While the formal definition is somewhat vague, the term "light novel" generally refers to a young adult novel, often accompanied by illustrations in a style similar to manga. They frequently involve romantic comedy and isekai elements. Light novels are often adapted into manga, anime, and live-action films. Some are serialized in literary magazines such as Faust, Gekkan Dragon Magazine, The Sneaker and Dengeki hp, or media franchise magazines like Comptiq and Dengeki G's Magazine.

Light novels have a reputation as being "mass-produced and disposable," an extreme example being Kazuma Kamachi who wrote one novel a month for two years straight, and the author turnover rate is very high. As such, publishing companies are constantly searching for new talent with annual contests, many of which earn the winner a cash prize and publication of their novel. The Dengeki Novel Prize is the largest, with over 6,500 submissions (2013) annually. They are all clearly labeled as "light novels" and are published as low-priced paperbacks. For example, the price for The Melancholy of Haruhi Suzumiya in Japan is ¥540 (including 5% tax), similar to the normal price for trade paperbacks—light novels and general literature—sold in Japan. In 2007 it was estimated (according to a website funded by the Japanese government) that the market for light novels was about ¥20 billion (US$170 million at the exchange rate at the time) and that about 30 million copies were published annually. Kadokawa Corporation's publishing subsidiary, which owns major labels like Kadokawa Sneaker Bunko and Dengeki Bunko, has a 70% to 80% share of the market. In 2009, light novels made ¥30.1 billion in sales, or about 20% of all sales of bunkobon format paperback books in Japan.

There are currently many licensed English translations of Japanese light novels available. These have generally been published in the physical dimensions of standard mass market paperbacks or similar to manga tankōbon, but starting in April 2007, Seven Seas Entertainment was the first English publisher to print light novels in their original Japanese bunkobon format. Other United States English-language publishers that license light novels are Tokyopop, Viz Media, DMP, Dark Horse, J-Novel Club (owned by Kadokawa), Yen Press (Kadokawa's American joint-venture with Hachette Book Group), and formerly Del Rey Manga. The founder of Viz Media, Seiji Horibuchi, speculates that the US market for light novels will experience a similar increase in popularity as it has in the Japanese subculture once it becomes recognized by the consumer audience.

== History ==
Popular literature has a long tradition in Japan. Even though cheap, pulp novels resembling light novels were present in Japan for years prior, the creation of Sonorama Bunko in 1975 is considered by some to be a symbolic beginning. Science fiction and horror writers like Hideyuki Kikuchi or Baku Yumemakura started their careers through such imprints. Another origin is the serialization of Record of Lodoss War in the magazine Comptiq. Kim Morrissy of Anime News Network reported that Keita Kamikita, the system operator of a science fiction and fantasy forum, is usually credited with coining the term "light novel" in 1990. After noticing that the science fiction and fantasy novels that had emerged in the 1980s were also attracting anime and manga fans because of their illustrations by famous manga artists, Kamikita avoided using terms like "young adult" because the novels did not appeal to one particular demographic.

The 1990s saw the smash-hit Slayers series which merged fantasy-RPG elements with comedy. Some years later MediaWorks founded a pop-lit imprint called Dengeki Bunko, which produces well-known light novel series to this day. The Boogiepop series was their first major hit which soon was animated and got many anime watchers interested in literature.

Dengeki Bunko writers continued to slowly gain attention until the small light novel world experienced a boom around 2006. After the huge success of the Haruhi Suzumiya series, the number of publishers and readers interested in light novels suddenly skyrocketed.

Light novels became an important part of the Japanese 2D culture in the late 2000s, with series such as A Certain Magical Index selling large amounts of copies with each volume release. The number of light novels series put out every year increases, usually illustrated by the most celebrated artists from pixiv and the most successful works are adapted into manga, anime, games and live-action movies.

Since the mid-2000s, it has become increasing popular for publishers to contact authors of web fiction on their blog or website to publish their work in print form. The material is often heavily edited and may even feature an altered story, which might compel someone who had already read it online to buy the print release as well. The free novel publication website Shōsetsuka ni Narō is a popular source for such material. Popular works like Sword Art Online, That Time I Got Reincarnated as a Slime, Overlord, Re:Zero and KonoSuba were originally popular web novels that got contacted by a publisher to distribute and publish those stories in print format.

One popular genre in the light novel category is isekai (異世界) or "different world" stories. In these stories usually feature an ordinary person that is transported from a modern city life to a world of fantasy and adventure. Sword Art Online, a web novel initially published in 2002, contributed to the popularization of 'Isekai' as a genre. This web novel became extremely popular, forming various adaptations such as an anime, manga, and even various movies and spinoff series. Because of the success of Sword Art Online, other novels such as KonoSuba, Overlord and Re:Zero became increasingly more popular. The success of Sword Art Online and 'isekai' as a whole contributed to the creation of write-your-own fiction websites in Japan and increasing popularity of light novels in the west as well.

== Outside Japan ==
=== Taiwan, Hong Kong, and Macau ===
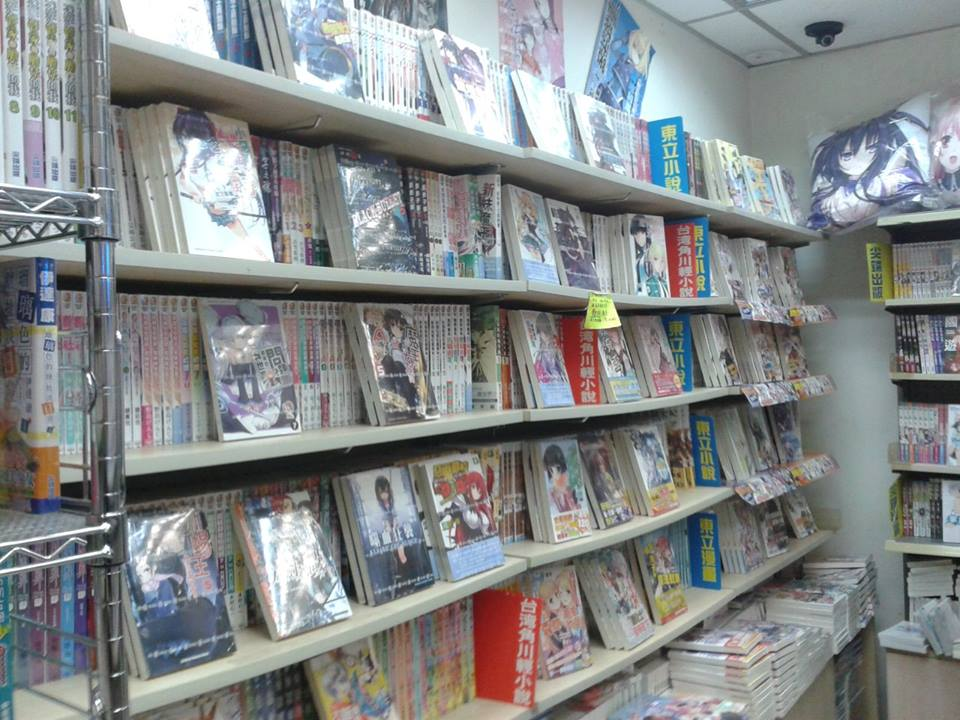
A light novel bookstore in Macau

The Kadokawa Group's local subsidiary, Kadokawa Taiwan (Chinese: 台灣角川; pinyin: Táiwān Jiǎochuān), translated and sold Chinese versions of their own light novels in Taiwan and Hong Kong, after being established as the first overseas branch in 1999 by Kadokawa Japan. In 2007, Chingwin and Shueisha signed an exclusive contract to publish Super Dash Bunko and Cobalt Bunko under the name Elite Novels. Subsequently, GA Bunko and HJ Bunko, which were slowly starting to gain popularity in Japan, also signed exclusive contracts with local publishers. As time went on, the original exclusive contracts were gradually opened to other publishers.

=== Mainland China ===
Translated versions of Kadokawa works are published by Kadokawa's Chinese subsidiary, Guangzhou Tenmon Kadokawa Doman Co. Ltd. In addition to Japanese light novels, there are works by Chinese as well as Taiwanese authors. There is also a magazine called Tenman Light Novels, which established a Newcomer's Award and says that the awards for the best full-length works may even be presented in Japan. Additionally, translated versions of other works such as Nisio Isin's Katanagatari have also been published in China.

=== South Korea ===
In South Korea, Daewon C.I., Haksan Publishing and Seoul Cultural Publishers, Inc are known to translate many popular Japanese titles, and they are easily available at larger bookstores.

=== U.S. and Europe ===
In the United States, hundreds of different light novels have been translated into English, the two largest publishers being Yen Press, a joint venture between Kadokawa and Hachette Book Group, and Seven Seas Entertainment. Other publishers such as Viz Media (owned by Shogakukan and Shueisha), Vertical (owned by Kodansha USA), One Peace Books, J-Novel Club (owned by Kadokawa), Cross Infinite Worlds, Sol Press have all been making an effort to publish more light novels in English. The success of anime adapted from light novels, such as Sword Art Online, along with the surge in popularity of the isekai genre has helped to make light novels more mainstream. Additionally, light novel authors have been starting to make guest appearances overseas at anime conventions such as at the 2019 Anime Expo, one of the biggest anime conventions of the year, which featured creators such as Kumo Kagyu, author of Goblin Slayer, and Fujino Omori, the author of Is It Wrong to Pick up Girls in a Dungeon? Furthermore, online book stores, particularly Amazon Kindle, have a tendency to recommend light novel titles after a customer has purchased one, which, along with Ebooks being more accessible than physical books, has boosted their sales.

In Europe, TOKYOPOP mainly translated and publishes works by the Kadokawa Group and Cobalt Bunko in Germany, for which publishing is done by Carlsen Verlag.

== Web novel ==
A web novel is a literary work that is published mainly or exclusively on the Internet. Web novels offer authors the opportunity to share their stories directly online in a continuous format, reaching a wide audience. In Japan, many light novels begin as web novels before being revised and published in print. This model allows authors to receive valuable feedback from readers and further develop their works before physical publication. The low entry barrier also provides unknown authors with the chance to gain recognition and build a fan base without relying on the support of a traditional publisher.

== See also ==
- Cell phone novel
- Chick lit
- Graphic novel
- Illustrated fiction
- List of best-selling light novels
- List of light novel labels
- LitRPG
- Romantic fantasy
- Visual novel
- Web fiction
- Young adult literature
