= Rurouni Kenshin =

Japanese manga series

- 28th tankōbon volume cover, featuring Himura Kenshin (front) and Kamiya Kaoru (back)

るろうに剣心 -明治剣客浪漫譚- (Rurōni Kenshin -Meiji Kenkaku Roman Tan-)
- Genre: Adventure; Martial arts; Romance
- Manga
- Written by: Nobuhiro Watsuki
- Published by: Shueisha
- English publisher: NA: Viz Media
- Imprint: Jump Comics
- Magazine: Weekly Shōnen Jump
- Original run: April 12, 1994 – September 21, 1999
- Volumes: 28
- Manga
- Restoration (2012–13); Master of Flame (2014); The Hokkaido Arc (2017–present)
- Anime series
- First TV series (1996–98); Second TV series (2023–present)
- Anime film / Original video animations
- The Motion Picture (1997); Trust & Betrayal (1999); Reflection (2001–02); New Kyoto Arc (2011–12)
- Live-action films
- Rurouni Kenshin (2012); Kyoto Inferno (2014); The Legend Ends (2014); The Final (2021); The Beginning (2021)
- icon

Rurouni Kenshin: Meiji Swordsman Romantic Story (Japanese: るろうに剣心 -明治剣客浪漫譚-, Hepburn: Rurōni Kenshin -Meiji Kenkaku Roman Tan- (Note: 'The Epic Tale of a Meiji Swordsman: The Wanderer, Kenshin'. Rurōni (るろうに) is a stylized spelling of rurōnin (流浪人), the word for 'wanderer'.)) is a Japanese manga series written and illustrated by Nobuhiro Watsuki. The story begins in 1878, the 11th year of the Meiji era in Japan, and follows a former assassin of the Bakumatsu, known as Hitokiri Battosai. After his work against the bakufu, he becomes Himura Kenshin, a wandering swordsman who protects the people of Japan with a vow never to take another life. Watsuki wrote the series based on his desire to make a shōnen manga series different from others published at the time, with Kenshin being a former assassin and the story taking a more serious tone as it progressed.

Rurouni Kenshin was serialized in Shueisha's shōnen manga magazine Weekly Shōnen Jump from April 1994 to September 1999. Its chapters were collected in 28 tankōbon volumes; it was later republished in a 22-volume kanzenban edition and a 14-volume bunkoban edition. The manga was adapted into an anime television series, produced by SPE Visual Works and animated by Studio Gallop and later by Studio Deen, aired from January 1996 to September 1998. In addition to an animated feature film, Rurouni Kenshin: The Motion Picture, two series of original video animations (OVAs) were also produced; Rurouni Kenshin: Trust & Betrayal, which adapted stories from the manga that were not featured in the anime, and Rurouni Kenshin: Reflection, a sequel to the manga. In 2017, Watsuki began publishing a direct sequel, Rurouni Kenshin: The Hokkaido Arc, in Jump Square. A second anime television series adaptation by Liden Films premiered in July 2023. In addition, other media based on the franchise has been produced, including a series of five live-action theatrical film adaptations, beginning with Rurouni Kenshin in 2012 and ending with Rurouni Kenshin: The Beginning in 2021, and video games for the PlayStation, PlayStation 2, and PlayStation Portable. Several art and guidebooks have been published, and writer Kaoru Shizuka has written three official light novels, which were published by Shueisha.

The manga, as well as the first light novel and guidebook, have been published in North America by Viz Media. The Rurouni Kenshin manga had over 72 million copies in circulation by 2019, making it one of the best-selling manga series of all time. The series has received praise from various publications for manga, anime, and other media, particularly for the characters' designs and historical setting.

== Plot ==
The series takes place in 1878, eleven years after the beginning of the Meiji era. After participating in the Boshin War as the assassin Hitokiri Battōsai, Himura Kenshin wanders the countryside of Japan, offering protection and aid to those in need as atonement for the murders he once committed. Having vowed to never kill again, he now wields a reverse-bladed katana. Upon arriving in Tokyo, he meets a young woman named Kamiya Kaoru, who is fighting a murderer who claims to be the Hitokiri Battōsai and is tarnishing the name of the swordsmanship school that she teaches. Kenshin decides to help her and defeats the fake Battōsai. After discovering that Kenshin is the true Hitokiri Battōsai, Kaoru offers him a place to stay at her dojo, noting that he is peace-loving and not cold-hearted, as his reputation had implied. Kenshin accepts and begins to form lifelong relationships with others, including Sagara Sanosuke, a former member of the Sekihō Army; Myōjin Yahiko, an orphan from a samurai family who also lives with Kaoru as her student; and doctor Takani Megumi, who has become involved in the opium trade. However, he also deals with old and new enemies, including the former leader of the Oniwabanshū, Shinomori Aoshi.

After several months living in the dojo, Kenshin faces Saitō Hajime, a rival from Bakumatsu who is now a police officer. This challenge turns out to be a test to face his successor, Shishio Makoto, who plans to conquer Japan by destroying the Meiji Government, starting with Kyoto. Feeling that Shishio's faction may attack his friends, Kenshin meets Shishio alone to defeat him. However, many of his friends, including a young Oniwabanshū named Makimachi Misao, whom he meets during his travels, decide to help him in his fight. After his first meeting with him, Kenshin realizes that he must become stronger to defeat Shishio without becoming the cold assassin he was in the past and returns to the man who taught him kenjutsu, Hiko Seijūrō, to learn the school's final technique. Finally accepting the help of his friends, he defeats Shishio, who dies after exceeding the limits of his abnormal body condition, after which a reformed Shinomori stays in Kyoto with the surviving Oniwabanshū.

When Kenshin and his friends return to Tokyo, he finds Yukishiro Enishi, who plans to take revenge. At this point, it is revealed that, during the Bakumatsu, Kenshin was to be married to Yukishiro Tomoe, who sought to avenge the death of her first fiancé, whom he had assassinated, but instead they fell in love and he proposed to her. Because she was related to the Edo guards who sought to kill Kenshin, they realized her deception and captured her to use as bait. In the final fight against the group's leader, Kenshin accidentally killed Tomoe after she took a blow meant for him. Seeking revenge for the death of his sister, Enishi kidnaps Kaoru and Kenshin and his friends set out to rescue her. A final battle between Kenshin and Enishi ensues, with Kenshin emerging victorious. Misao brings Tomoe's diary to Enishi, who keeps it in a village to hide along with his missing father.

Four years later, Kenshin has married Kaoru and has a son named Himura Kenji. Now at peace with himself, Kenshin gives his reverse-blade sword to Yahiko as a ceremonial gift.

== Production ==
=== One-shots ===
A prototype series titled Rurouni: Meiji Swordsman Romantic Story appeared as two separate short stories published in 1992 and 1993. The first story, published in December 1992 in the Weekly Shōnen Jump Winter Special issue for 1993, featured an early version of Kenshin preventing a crime lord from taking over the Kamiya dojo. Watsuki described this first story, which echoed the later "Megumi Arc," as a pilot for Rurouni Kenshin. He stated that the final series was not entirely his own initiative; finding historical stories difficult, he had initially wanted to create a contemporary series. After an editor requested a new historical story, Watsuki developed a concept set in the Bakumatsu period inspired by Moeyo Ken (Burn, O Sword) with a narrative approach similar to Sanshiro Sugata. He experimented with various titles, including Nishin (Two-Hearts) Kenshin, Yorozuya (Jack-of-All-Trades) Kenshin, and variations of "Rurouni" and "Kenshin" using different kanji.

The second Rurouni story, published in April 1993 in the Weekly Shōnen Jump 21–22 double issue, featured Kenshin aiding a wealthy girl named Raikōji Chizuru. Watsuki recalled difficulty condensing the narrative into 31 pages. He stated that he "put all [his] soul into it," but later viewed it less favorably after beginning the main Rurouni Kenshin serialization. This second one-shot received mediocre reviews and approximately 200 reader letters. Watsuki referred to it as a "side story."

The design for Hiko Seijuro, Kenshin's master, was based on a character of the same name from Watsuki's one-shot "Crescent Moon of the Warring States," with additional influence from Hiken Majin Hajerun in Takeshi Obata's Arabian Lamp-Lamp. Watsuki noted his fascination with images of "manliness" and that Hiko was an early reflection of this interest. Seeking to create a character opposite to the tall, armored man from his debut work, Watsuki designed Kenshin to appear feminine. He stated he used "no real motif" for Kenshin and added the cross-shaped scar without specific intent. Like several characters, Kenshin was influenced by the Shinsengumi, incorporating elements from Okita Sōji and Saitō Hajime to convey an air of mystery.

=== Publication and influences ===
The final scene of the Kyoto arc was influenced by the anime adaptation's focus on Kenshin being accepted into Kaoru's dojo

From his initial storyboards, Watsuki noted that Kenshin's appearance resembled Kurama from Yoshihiro Togashi's YuYu Hakusho. He considered himself less experienced at the time and preferred drawing handsome men, contrasting with the design of Hiko Seijuro from a previous one-shot. Watsuki felt Rurouni Kenshin competed more with the dramatic focus of YuYu Hakusho than action-oriented series like Dragon Ball. To distinguish his series, he crafted Kenshin as an adult with a dark past rooted in the Edo period. Despite competition from major 1990s Weekly Shōnen Jump titles like Slam Dunk, Dragon Ball, and YuYu Hakusho, the manga performed well. Kenshin's adult status was a departure from typical young shōnen protagonists, aside from series like City Hunter, and Watsuki was mindful of character aging. Watsuki's childhood kendo practice influenced the series. While developing one-shots, he based some character names on places he had lived, such as Makimachi Misao and Sanjō Tsubame, named after locations in Niigata.

An editor suggested Watsuki examine the Samurai Shodown fighting games for character inspiration. He aimed for a realistic series, generally avoiding supernatural elements despite the shōnen demographic, with few exceptions like Yukishiro Enishi's double-jump ability to counter Kenshin's aerial style. For the ending, Watsuki believed a mass murderer like Kenshin should face death, citing Ashita no Joe as a precedent for a hero's demise. When serialization began, Watsuki had modest expectations and planned to conclude the story in about 30 chapters with Kenshin departing Tokyo, similar to volume 7. Antagonists from Kyoto would send an assassin after him. The introduction of the Oniwabanshū expanded the cast, and the series's popularity grew significantly following reader surveys.

For the seventh volume, Watsuki's editor proposed a longer story arc, leading to the creation of the conflict with Shishio Makoto. Initially planned for one year, the Kyoto arc extended to a year and a half. This arc developed Kenshin's character, whom Watsuki felt lacked weaknesses, and honed the author's artistic skills. The final Jinchu arc, conceived pre-serialization, became longer than intended to avoid oversimplification. To lighten the Kyoto arc's dark tone, Watsuki introduced the comical Makimachi Misao.

Fascinated by the Shinsengumi, Watsuki based characters on historical members and fictional representations from Japan's Bakumatsu period. He found historical characterization challenging. After difficulties with Sagara Sōzō, he designed Saitō Hajime in his own style, diverging from history, and was pleased with the result. However, he noted that some Japanese Shinsengumi fans objected to Saitō's sadistic portrayal. The final scene of Kenshin returning to the dojo was inspired by the first opening of the anime adaptation, "Sobakasu" by Judy and Mary.

For the final arc, Watsuki intended to portray the five comrades as "scum-like," but found it difficult to make enjoyable villains without ideals or beliefs. The story darkened when most characters believed Kaoru was killed by Yukishiro Enishi, causing Kenshin to question his path and retreat. Watsuki disliked Kenshin's angst, so Myōjin Yahiko temporarily became the protagonist. Although the plot for Kenshin's past was set years before serialization, Watsuki expressed regrets about his portrayal of Yukishiro Tomoe. The final villains, the Sū-shin, lacked personality models and were created to "fill out the numbers" as the story progressed.

=== Ending ===
Watsuki considered a "Hokkaido episode" sequel but chose to end Rurouni Kenshin with the Jinchu arc to begin a new manga. Due to the series's dark themes, he concluded it fearing further development would not suit the shōnen demographic. In 2012, Watsuki revealed that his editor, Hisashi Sasaki, supported his decision to end the series at its peak of popularity, respecting both the author's physical limits and the readers. Watsuki expressed satisfaction with the ending, contrasting it with series that continue until canceled due to declining popularity.

For the finale, Watsuki designed new looks with potential sequels in mind. He initially planned to shorten Kenshin's hair but found it too similar to Multi from To Heart. Himura Kenji, the "cliché" son of Kenshin and Kaoru, was introduced as Watsuki felt his appearance was necessary. A design for an older Sanosuke was drafted but went unused, later repurposed for his father, Higashidani Kamishimoemon. Watsuki expressed attachment to Enishi and a desire to use him in a future work.

Another sequel concept involved a teenage Yahiko. Watsuki redesigned him to impress readers as a potential protagonist, blending Kenshin's appearance with Sanosuke's personality. He added Sanosuke's kanji for "evil" (惡, aku) to Yahiko's clothing, pleased that readers recognized it. While not planning a sequel, he suggested it would star Yahiko, Sanjō Tsubame, and Tsukayama Yutarō, potentially featuring their son, Myōjin Shin'ya, as a skilled swordsman.

== Themes ==
The series's central theme is responsibility, exemplified by Himura Kenshin's quest for atonement for his past as an assassin during the Bakumatsu by vowing to protect the innocent with a reverse-bladed sword (sakabatō). Marco Olivier of Nelson Mandela Metropolitan University notes that the sakabatō symbolizes Kenshin's oath never to kill again, a pledge frequently tested by other warriors in the narrative. This theme of redemption inspires other characters, such as the former drug dealer Takani Megumi, to reform and become a doctor after learning of Kenshin's past. Another significant theme is the pursuit of power, primarily explored through Sagara Sanosuke and Myōjin Yahiko, who seek to become stronger to support Kenshin. The narrative also discourages revenge, as illustrated in the final arc when Yukishiro Enishi, upon believing he has achieved vengeance, is tormented by hallucinations of his deceased sister wearing a sorrowful expression.

Author Nobuhiro Watsuki described Myōjin Yahiko as an "outlet" for his kendo enthusiasm, noting that Yahiko "knows a pain that hero-types like Himura Kenshin and Sagara Sanosuke can never know". To better relate to the series's young demographic, Watsuki strengthened Yahiko's character gradually, culminating in significant development during the Kyoto arc that surprised readers.

When asked if self-redemption was the series's central theme, Watsuki cited the influence of shōjo manga from his youth on his writing. He intended to distinguish Kenshin as a protagonist who is neither purely good nor evil. While the story adopted a more adult tone from volume 7 onward due to its conflicts, Watsuki noted it retained a shōjo influence. During development, he considered killing off Kamiya Kaoru but ultimately chose a happy ending suitable for the young readership. The Oxford Handbook of American Folklore and Folklife Studies observes that Kenshin is a "far cry" from American superheroes due to his androgynous appearance and self-deprecating nature. However, his quest for redemption is identified as the manga's core theme, making him relatable to Eastern audiences, and the narrative is noted for balancing individualism with community.

Watsuki described himself as an "infatuated" rather than "passionate" person, leading him to subtitle the series a "Meiji Swordsman Story" instead of a "Meiji Love Story". According to Bringing Forth a World: Engaged Pedagogy in the Japanese University, the manga reflects the societal confusion in Japan following the economic disenchantment of the early 1990s and presents a contrast to visualizations of Japanese history found in school textbooks, particularly given its young audience. While grounded in realism, the series offers an optimistic portrayal of samurai that diverges from historical accuracy. This unique approach, particularly in its handling of Kenshin's character, led to the manga being conceptualized as "neo shonen" for its departure from previous norms in Weekly Shōnen Jump.

== Media ==
=== Manga ===
Written and illustrated by Nobuhiro Watsuki, Rurouni Kenshin was serialized in Shueisha's shōnen manga magazine Weekly Shōnen Jump from April 12, 1994, (Note: It debuted in the magazine's 19th issue of 1994 (cover date April 25), released on April 12 of that same year.) to September 21, 1999. (Note: It finished in the magazine's 43rd issue of 1999 (cover date October 4), released on September 21 of the same year; Naruto's debut issue.) The 255 individual chapters were collected and published in 28 tankōbon volumes by Shueisha, with the first volume released on September 9, 1994, and the last on November 4, 1999. They re-released the series in a 22-volume kanzenban edition between July 4, 2006, and May 2, 2007. Shueisha published a 14-volume bunkoban edition between January 18 and July 18, 2012. A single-chapter follow-up to the series that follows the character of Yahiko Myōjin, "Yahiko no Sakabato" (弥彦の逆刃刀; "Yahiko's Sakabatō"), was originally published in Weekly Shōnen Jump in 2000 after the conclusion of the series. Left out of the original volumes, it was added as an extra to the final kanzenban release.

In December 2011, Shueisha announced Watsuki would be putting his series, Embalming -The Another Tale of Frankenstein-, on hold to begin a "reboot" of Rurouni Kenshin, called Rurouni Kenshin: Restoration, as a tie-in to the live-action film. The series began in the June 2012 issue of Jump Square, which was released on May 2, 2012, and ended in the July 2013 issue on June 4, 2013. The reboot depicts the battles that were featured in the first live-action film. Another special, "Act Zero", was published in Weekly Shōnen Jump in August 2012 as a prologue to Restoration and included in its first volume. In 2014, Watsuki wrote a two-chapter spin-off titled Rurouni Kenshin: Master of Flame for Jump SQ., which tells how Shishio met Yumi and formed the Juppongatana.

Watsuki and his wife, Kaworu Kurosaki, collaborated on a two-chapter spin-off titled Rurouni Kenshin Side Story: The Ex-Con Ashitaro for the ninth anniversary of Jump SQ. in 2016. It acts as a prologue to Rurouni Kenshin: The Hokkaido Arc, which began in September 2017 as a sequel to the original manga series. In 2021, Watsuki created the manga "Sakabatō Shogeki" (逆刃刀 初撃; "Reverse-Blade Katana: First Bout") that was exclusively shown at an exhibition celebrating the 25th anniversary of Rurouni Kenshin. It serves as an epilogue to chapter 81 of the original manga and shows the first time Kenshin used his sakabatō. The chapter was later adapted into the episode 34 of the 2023 Rurouni Kenshin anime series, "Sakabato First Attack".

Rurouni Kenshin was licensed for an English-language release in North America by Viz Media. The first volume of the series was released on October 7, 2003. Although the first volumes were published on an irregular basis, since volume 7, Viz has established a monthly basis due to good sales and consumer demands. Therefore, the following volumes were published until July 5, 2006, when the final volume was released. "Yahiko no Sakabatō" was also published in English in Shonen Jump on August 1, 2006. Between January 29, 2008, and March 16, 2010, Viz re-released the manga in a nine-volume omnibus format called "Viz Big Edition", which collects three volumes in one. The ninth and final volume includes "Yahiko no Sakabato" and "Cherry Blossoms in Spring". They released a similar "3-in-1 Edition" across nine volumes between January 3, 2017, and January 1, 2019. Viz uses the actual ordering of Japanese names, with the family name or surname before the given name, within the series to reduce confusion and because Rurouni Kenshin is a historical series.

=== Anime series ===
An anime television series adaptation of Rurouni Kenshin, produced by SPE Visual Works and Fuji TV, animated by Studio Gallop (episodes 1–66) and Studio Deen (episodes 67–95), and directed by Kazuhiro Furuhashi, was broadcast on Fuji TV from January 1996 to September 1998.

A second anime television series adaptation by Liden Films was announced at Jump Festa '22 in December 2021. The series's first season was broadcast from July to December 2023 on Fuji TV's Noitamina programming block. A second season, subtitled Kyoto Disturbance, aired from October 2024 to March 2025.

==== Animated film ====
An anime film with an original story, titled Rurouni Kenshin: The Motion Picture (るろうに剣心 -明治剣客浪漫譚- 維新志士への鎮魂歌, Rurouni Kenshin: Ishin Shishi e no Chinkonka) lit. 'Rurouni Kenshin: Requiem for Isshin Patriots', also known as Rurouni Kenshin: Requiem for Patriots, originally released in North America as Samurai X: The Motion Picture, premiered in December 1997.

==== Original video animations ====
A 4-episode original video animation (OVA), titled Rurouni Kenshin: Trust & Betrayal, which served as a prequel to the first anime television series, was released in 1999.

A two-episode OVA titled Rurouni Kenshin: Reflection, which served as a sequel to the first anime television series, was released from 2001 to 2002.

A two-episode OVA, Rurouni Kenshin: New Kyoto Arc, which remade the series's Kyoto arc, was released from 2011 to 2012.

=== Live-action films ===
Five live-action films have been released theatrically. The live-action film adaptation of Rurouni Kenshin was announced on June 28, 2011. Produced by Warner Bros., with actual film production done by Studio Swan, the films were directed by Keishi Ōtomo and starred Takeru Satoh (of Kamen Rider Den-O fame) as Kenshin, Munetaka Aoki as Sanosuke Sagara, and Emi Takei as Kaoru. The first film, titled Rurouni Kenshin, was released on August 25, 2012. In August 2013, it was announced that two sequels were being filmed simultaneously for release in 2014. Rurouni Kenshin: Kyoto Inferno and Rurouni Kenshin: The Legend Ends adapt the Kyoto arc of the manga. In April 2019, it was announced that two new live-action films would adapt the Remembrance/Tenchu and Jinchu arcs; the films, titled Rurouni Kenshin: The Final and Rurouni Kenshin: The Beginning, premiered in 2021.

=== Stage shows ===
In 2016, the Takarazuka Revue performed a musical adaptation of the manga called Rurouni Kenshin: Meiji Swordsman Romantic Story. The show ran from February to March and starred Seina Sagiri as Kenshin and Miyu Sakihi as Kaoru. The musical was written and directed by Shūichirō Koike.

In 2018, a stage play adaptation was performed in the Shinbashi Enbujō theater in Tokyo and Shōchikuza theater in Osaka. Seina Sagiri returned to play Kenshin, while Moka Kamishiraishi played Kaoru. Kanō Sōzaburō, an original character introduced in the previous musical, made a return appearance, played by Mitsuru Matsuoka. Shūichirō Koike returned as the director and the script writer of the play.

A stage musical adaptation of the manga's Kyoto arc was scheduled to be held from November to December 2020 at IHI Stage Around Tokyo. Starring Teppei Koike as Himura Kenshin and Mario Kuroba as the antagonist Makoto Shishio, Shūichirō Koike returned as director and script writer of the play. This stage musical was cancelled due to the COVID-19 pandemic.

=== Art and guidebooks ===
Two encyclopedias to the Rurouni Kenshin manga were released; the first one, Rurouni Kenshin Profiles (原典), was released first in Japan on July 4, 1996, by Shueisha and in the United States by Viz Media on November 1, 2005. Kenshin Kaden (剣心華伝), released on December 15, 1999, includes the story Haru no Sakura (春の桜; lit."Cherry Blossoms in Spring"), which details the fates of all of the Rurouni Kenshin characters. The story takes place years after the manga's conclusion, when Kenshin and Kaoru have married and have a young son, Kenji. Many of the series's major characters who have befriended Kenshin reunite with him or otherwise reveal their current whereabouts at a spring picnic. A guidebook to the kanzenban edition of the series, Kenshin Kaiden (剣心皆伝), was published on June 4, 2007. Rurouni Kenshin Magazine Reiwa 7 Summer (るろうに剣心 magazine 令和七年 夏) was released on July 4, 2025. It includes an interview between Watsuki and his first editor on the series, Hisashi Sasaki, previously untold stories about the creation of Shishio's faction, the original name for Sakabatō Shogeki, and tribute illustrations by various artists that were originally created for the manga's 30th anniversary exhibit.

For the anime, three Kenshin Soushi artbooks were published from 1997 to 1998. While the first two were based on the TV series, the third one was based on the film. The film one was named Ishin Shishi no Requiem Art Book and was released along with the movie. Also released was the Rurouni-Art Book, which contained images from the OVAs.

=== Light novels ===
The Rurouni Kenshin light novels were published by Shueisha's Jump J-Books line and co-written by Kaoru Shizuka. Most of them are original stories that were later adapted into the anime. Others are adaptations of manga and anime stories. The very first novel, Rurouni Kenshin: Voyage to the Moon World, which was published in Japan on October 10, 1996, and in North America on October 17, 2006, details another adventure involving the return of Tales of the Meiji Season 3's Beni-Aoi Arc characters like Kaishu Katsu and the Kamiya Dojo's third pupil, Daigoro. The second, Yahiko's Battle, was released on October 3, 1997. It retells various stories featured in the manga and anime series. The third novel, TV Anime Shimabara Arc, was published on February 4, 1999. A novel adaptation of Rurouni Kenshin Cinema-ban, titled Rurouni Kenshin -Ginmaku Sōshihen- (るろうに剣心 ―銀幕草紙変―) and written by Watsuki's wife Kaworu Kurosaki, which was released on September 4, 2012, is a Japanese light novel version of America's Restoration's New Kurogasa (Jin-E) Arc manga featuring Banshin and a different younger Gein. Both are Ishin members of Enishi's team in the Jinchu/Tenchu (Judgment of Earth/Heaven) portions of the Enishi saga in the main plot manga series.

=== Video games ===
There have been five Rurouni Kenshin video games released for the PlayStation series of consoles. The first, Rurouni Kenshin: Meiji Kenkaku Romantan: Ishin Gekitōhen (るろうに剣心 -明治剣客浪漫譚- 維新激闘編), was released on November 29, 1996. It was developed by ZOOM Inc. and published by Sony Computer Entertainment. The game is a 3D fighting game with nine playable characters, with the plot being based on the first seven volumes of the manga. The second one, Rurouni Kenshin: Meiji Kenkaku Romantan: Jūyūshi Inbō Hen (るろうに剣心 -明治剣客浪漫譚- 十勇士陰謀編 – The Ten Warrior Conspiracy), was released on December 18, 1997, and was re-released in the PlayStation The Best lineup on November 5, 1998. The game is a role-playing video game with an original story unrelated to either the manga or anime.

Rurouni Kenshin: Meiji Kenkaku Romantan: Enjō! Kyōto Rinne (るろうに剣心 -明治剣客浪漫譚- 炎上!京都輪廻) is the only video game for the PlayStation 2 console. Its Japanese release was slated for September 13, 2006. The game has sold over 130,000 copies in Japan. The game was developed by Eighting and published by Banpresto. A 2D fighting game titled Rurouni Kenshin: Meiji Kenkaku Romantan: Saisen (るろうに剣心 -明治剣客浪漫譚- 再閃) was released for the PlayStation Portable on March 10, 2011. On August 30, 2012, a sequel, Rurouni Kenshin: Meiji Kenkaku Romantan: Kansei (るろうに剣心 -明治剣客浪漫譚- 完醒), was released. Both games were developed by Natsume Co., Ltd. and published by Bandai Namco Games.

Himura Kenshin also appears in the 2005 and 2006 Nintendo DS games Jump Super Stars and Jump Ultimate Stars as the sole battle character representing his series, while others are support characters and help characters. Kenshin and Shishio appeared as playable characters in the 2014 PlayStation 3 and PlayStation Vita game J-Stars Victory VS and in the 2019 game Jump Force for Windows, PlayStation 4, and Xbox One.

=== Audio dramas ===
Several drama CDs that adapt stories from the Rurouni Kenshin manga were released. They feature different voice actors than those that later worked on the anime adaptation. In Volume 5 of the manga, Watsuki stated that he was anticipating the third installment, which would adapt the Udō Jin-e arc. He expected it to be "pretty close" to his original, but with additional lines for Sanosuke and Yahiko.

=== Merchandise ===
Watsuki commented that there had been a lot of Rurouni Kenshin merchandise released for the Japanese market. He recommended that buyers consider quality before paying for merchandise items and that they consult their wallets and buy stuff that they feel is "worth it". Watsuki added that he liked the prototype for a stuffed Kenshin doll for the UFO catcher devices.

== Reception ==
=== Sales and popularity ===
Rurouni Kenshin has been highly popular, having sold over 55 million copies in Japan alone up until February 2012, making it one of Shueisha's top ten best-selling manga series. In 2014, it was reported that the series had 70 million tankōbon copies in circulation. By December 2019, the manga had over 72 million copies in circulation, including digital releases. Volume 27 of the manga ranked second in the Viz Bookscan Top Ten during June 2006, while volumes 21 and 20 ranked second and tenth, respectively, in the Top 10 Graphic Novels of Viz of 2005. Rurouni Kenshin volume 24 ranked 116th on USA Today's best-selling book list for the week ending February 26, 2006. During the third quarter of 2003, Rurouni Kenshin ranked at the top of ICv2's Top 50 Manga Properties. In the same poll from 2005, it was featured at the top once again based on sales from English volumes during 2004. In the Top Ten Manga Properties from 2006 from the same site, it ranked ninth. In November 2014, readers of Da Vinci magazine voted Rurouni Kenshin as the thirteenth Weekly Shōnen Jump's greatest manga series of all time. On TV Asahi's Manga Sōsenkyo 2021 poll, in which 150,000 people voted for their top 100 manga series, Rurouni Kenshin ranked 31st.

=== Critical response ===
The manga has received praise and criticism from various publications. Mania Entertainment writer Megan Lavey found that the manga had a good balance between character development, comedy, and action scenes. Watsuki's artwork was said to have improved as the series continued, noting that characters also had reactions during fights. Steve Raiteri from Library Journal praised the series for its characters and battles. However, he noted that some fights were too violent, so he recommended the series to older teenagers as well as adults. Surat described the series as an example of a "neo-shōnen" series, where a shōnen series also appeals to a female audience; Surat stated that in such series, character designs are "pretty" for female audiences but not too "girly" for male audiences. Surat cited Shinomori Aoshi and Seta Sōjirō, characters who ranked highly in popularity polls even though, in Surat's view, Aoshi does not engage in "meaningful" battles and Sōjirō is a "kid". Surat explained that Aoshi appears "like a Clamp character wearing Gambit's coat and Sōjirō always smiles despite the abuse inflicted upon him. Surat said that the character designs for the anime television series were "toughened up a bit". He added that the budget for animation and music was "top-notch" because Sony produced the budget. Watsuki's writing involving romance and Kenshin's psychological hidden weakpoints also earned positive responses from other sites, with AnimeNation also comparing it to Clamp's X based on the multiple elements of the series. In general, Mania found Watsuki's art appealing as well as its evolution across the twenty-eight volumes, as it made female characters more attractive while the male characters seemed simpler while retaining the early handsome looks.

As a result of the series taking a darker tone in later story arcs with Kenshin facing new threats and at the same time his Battosai self, Kat Kan from Voice of Youth Advocates recommended it to older teens. Kan also found that anime viewers will also enjoy Watsuki's drawings due to the way he illustrates battles. This is mostly noted in the "Kyoto arc", where Mania Entertainment writer Megan Lavey applauded the fight between Himura Kenshin and anti-hero Saito Hajime, which acts as the prologue of such a narrative. Mania remarks on the buildup Aoshi, Saito, and other characters bring to the story due to how they share similar goals in the same arc, with newcomer Misao helping to balance the style by bringing more comical interactions with the protagonist. Although the site Manga News enjoyed Seta Sojiro's fight and how it connected with Shishio's past, they said the sixteenth manga's best part was Kenshin's fight against Shishio due to the buildup and symbolism the two characters have. The eventual climax led to further praise based on how menacing Shishio is shown in the battle against his predecessor, although he questioned if Kenshin had been a superior enemy if he had kept back his original killer persona.

Critics expressed mixed opinions in regards to the final arc. Zac Bertschy from Anime News Network (ANN) praised the story from the manga but noted that by volume 18 of the series, Watsuki started to repeat the same type of villains who were united to kill Kenshin, similar to Trigun. Although he praised Watsuki's characters, he commented that some of them needed some consistency due to various "bizarre" antagonists. Due to Kaoru, Kenshin, and Sanosuke missing from the final arc during the Jinchu arc, Manga News described Aoshi as the star of the series's 24th volume due to how he explores the mysteries behind Enishi's revenge and his subsequent actions that made him stand out, most notably because he had been absent for multiple chapters. IGN reviewer A.E. Sparrow liked the manga's ending, praising how the storylines are resolved and how most of the supporting cast ends up. He also praised the series's characters, remarking that Kenshin "belongs in any top ten of manga heroes." Otaku USA reviewer Daryl Surat said that the manga's quality was good until the "Revenge Arc", where he criticized the storyline and the new characters. Carlo Santos from the same site praised Enishi and Kenshin's final fight despite finding the ending predictable. While also liking their final showdown, Megan Lavey from Mania Entertainment felt that the twist that happens shortly after the battle is over serves to show Enishi's long-life trauma and, at the same time, Kenshin's compassion towards others.

In Bringing Forth a World: Engaged Pedagogy in the Japanese University's seventh chapter, "The Renegotiation of Modernity", by media studies professor Maria Grajdian, Kenshin's heroic nature as a wanderer was compared to both Luke Skywalker and Harry Potter due to how he wishes to protect the weak people, seeing nothing wrong with such trait. This is heavily explored in the series when confronting the young Seta who had opposite values in terms how should the strong men act. This soft masculinity is exemplified as a result. There is also a balance between Kenshin's supernatural strength and small design, led a major impact in the audience due to how likable the protagonist is. His introduction marks his values with the sword which also affected Kaoru, Yahiko's and Sanosuke's values upon their meetings. In doing so, Rurouni Kenshin laid" more than twenty years ago the foundation of a fresh paradigm of humanity based on tenderness and mutual acceptance as a counter-movement to the individualism, competition and efficiency that characterize the project of modernity".

== Legacy ==
Before becoming a manga author himself, Masashi Kishimoto, the author of Naruto, decided to try creating a chanbara manga because Weekly Shōnen Jump had not published a title from that genre. However, during college, he started reading Blade of the Immortal and Rurouni Kenshin, both of which belong to the genre. Kishimoto recalls that he had never been surprised by manga since reading Akira, and he found that he was still unable to compete with those works. Hideaki Sorachi cited Rurouni Kenshin as a major source of inspiration for his manga series, Gintama. He also commented that the series influenced the existence of modern historical works, such as manga and video games. Kenshin's design partially inspired Koyoharu Gotouge for the appearance of Tanjiro Kamado, protagonist of Demon Slayer: Kimetsu no Yaiba.

For the series 25th anniversary in January 2021, 15 manga authors sent congratulatory messages: three of Watsuki's former assistants, Eiichiro Oda (One Piece), Hiroyuki Takei (Shaman King), and Shinya Suzuki (Mr. Fullswing); Nobuyuki Anzai (Flame of Recca); Riichiro Inagaki (Eyeshield 21); Takeshi Obata (Death Note); Masashi Kishimoto (Naruto); Mitsutoshi Shimabukuro (Toriko); Hideaki Sorachi (Gintama); Yasuhiro Nightow (Trigun); Kazuhiro Fujita (Ushio & Tora); Yusei Matsui (Assassination Classroom); and Kentaro Yabuki (Black Cat). In an interview for the event, Oda told Watsuki that the series's popularity is due to his loyalty to his fans.

Watsuki commented that Kenshin's tendency to defeat his enemies without killing them became a common trend for protagonists from other Weekly Shōnen Jump, series such as Monkey D. Luffy from One Piece and Naruto Uzumaki from Naruto.
