= Nobuhiro Watsuki =

Japanese manga artist (born 1970)

- 和月 伸宏
- Born: Nobuhiro Nishiwaki (西脇 伸宏, Nishiwaki Nobuhiro); May 26, 1970 (age 56); Tokyo, Japan
- Occupation: Manga artist
- Known for: Rurouni Kenshin; Buso Renkin
- Spouse: Kaworu Kurosaki

Nobuhiro Nishiwaki (Japanese: 西脇 伸宏, Hepburn: Nishiwaki Nobuhiro; born May 26, 1970), better known by his pen name Nobuhiro Watsuki (和月 伸宏, Watsuki Nobuhiro), is a Japanese manga artist. He is best known for his samurai-themed series Rurouni Kenshin: Meiji Swordsman Romantic Story (1994–1999), which has over 70 million copies in circulation, and a sequel he is currently creating, Rurouni Kenshin: The Hokkaido Arc (2017–present).

Watsuki has written three more manga series, Gun Blaze West (2001), Buso Renkin (2003–2005), and Embalming: The Another Tale of Frankenstein (2007–2015). He has mentored several well-known manga artists, including One Piece creator Eiichiro Oda, Shaman King creator Hiroyuki Takei, and Mr. Fullswing creator Shinya Suzuki. Watsuki was convicted of possessing child pornography in 2018.

== Early life ==
Watsuki was born on May 26, 1970, in Tokyo and was brought up in Nagaoka, Niigata. When he was in middle school, Watsuki practiced kendo. He still drew manga but also enjoyed sports, although he never won a kendo match. Watsuki grew frustrated with kendo, and eventually quit.

== Career ==
In high school, Watsuki received an honorable mention in the 33rd Tezuka Awards for his 1987 one-shot Teacher Pon, which he wrote under the pen name "Nobuhiro Nishiwaki". Hokuriku Yūrei Kobanashi earned him the Hop Step award. It was included in Hop Step Award Selection volume 6 in 1991. After graduating, Watsuki moved to Tokyo and worked as an assistant to Yōichi Takahashi and Takeshi Obata. Watsuki worked on Obata's Mashin Bōken Tan Lamp-Lamp and Chikara Bito Densetsu, the former's title character would later serve as a model for Sagara Sanosuke.

Watsuki then created three historically set samurai-themed one-shots; Crescent Moon in the Warring States, and two sharing the title Rurouni: Meiji Swordsman Romantic Story. Set in the Sengoku Jidai era of Japan's warring states, Crescent Moon in the Warring States relates the tale of the lone swordsman Hiko Seijūrō. The first Rurouni: Meiji Swordsman Romantic Story features Himura Kenshin stopping a crime lord from taking over the Kamiya family dojo. The second sees Kenshin saving a young girl who is being held ransom by fallen samurai. These three works served as the basis for his first serial; Rurouni Kenshin: Meiji Swordsman Romantic Story, which follows the former hitokiri Himura Kenshin and was serialized in Weekly Shōnen Jump from 1994 to 1999. It was a major success with over 70 million copies in circulation, and was adapted into an anime television series, several animated films, and a trilogy of live-action films. The story Haru ni Sakura, included in the Kenshin Kaden guidebook, details the fates of the main cast of Rurouni Kenshin following its conclusion. In Yahiko no Sakabatō, set five years after the conclusion of Rurouni Kenshin, Myōjin Yahiko must save the daughter of a dojo master from an old foe.

During Rurouni Kenshin's serialization, Watsuki wrote Meteor Strike, a one-shot written for a Weekly Shōnen Jump artists project. It chronicles the what-if adventures of a young boy who is struck in the head by a meteor and gains superhuman powers, eventually saving his town from a nuclear disaster. Watsuki felt disgusted with the work and originally did not plan on revealing it, but ultimately decided to include Meteor Strike in the final Rurouni Kenshin volume to increase its page count. Although, he said that after reading the story over again it "relaxed" him "in a nice way." Watsuki included three main elements in the story, which he described as having "some different flavors" than Rurouni Kenshin. He had wanted to use meteors in a story for a long time, since they are the "most energetic natural phenomena." His second element was a boy wearing a pair of white gloves. Watsuki described white gloves as "sort of plain" and "not cool at all," yet he considers the element to be one of his favorites since the gloves "give off a sense of strength." His third element is the girl wearing a construction site helmet. The helmet is masculine, while the Japanese school uniform that the girl wears is feminine. Watsuki said that he created the main character Shinya "on the spot," giving him too much honesty, and a personality that overlaps with that of Himura Kenshin, which he regrets "a little." Watsuki created Chiho, the other major character, to show the "shojo theme of the moment" when the boy out-matures the girl. Watsuki felt that the plan "didn't work out so well" and "a lot wasn't what I wanted it to be." He added that he liked portraying the "helpful nature" of Chiho.

In 2001, Watsuki created his second serialized work, the western Gun Blaze West. The story follows Viu Bannes, a young gunfighter on his journey towards Gun Blaze West, the place where the greatest gunmen go to test their strength. It ran in Weekly Shōnen Jump for less-than a year, from January 8 to August 13, 2001. Its three volumes were published in English by Viz.

His third serialization Buso Renkin, was published in Weekly Shōnen Jump between July 7, 2003, and May 9, 2005, with two special chapters published in Akamaru Jump. Watsuki is married to author Kaworu Kurosaki (黒碕薫, Kurosaki Kaoru). She has assisted her husband in writing several of his manga including Buso Renkin, which she later wrote two novelizations of. Watsuki described himself as "pro-dōjinshi" and asked fans to send fan comics. Buso Renkin became his second work to be adapted into an anime. Both the manga and anime were released in English by Viz Media.

Watsuki wrote two one-shots for Jump the Revolution!, Embalming -Dead Body and Bride- on November 1, 2005, and Embalming II -Dead Body and Lover- on November 1, 2006, that would become his fourth serial. Embalming -The Another Tale of Frankenstein- began in the debut issue of Jump SQ on November 2, 2007, and concluded on April 4, 2015. Kaworu Kurosaki again assisted him with the story. It draws largely from Mary Shelley's famed 1818 novel Frankenstein and follows a young man named Fury Flatliner, who was turned into a Frankenstein in order to destroy all the others and specifically seeks the one that killed his parents.

Between 2012 and 2013, Watsuki put Embalming on hold to write Rurouni Kenshin: Restoration in Jump SQ. This "reboot" depicts the battles that are featured in the first live-action Rurouni Kenshin film. Its two collected volumes were published in English by Viz Media. It was the first of several returns to the author's most famous series. Rurouni Kenshin: Restoration Act Zero was published in Weekly Shōnen Jump in August 2012 as a prologue to Restoration and included in its first volume. The two-part Rurouni Kenshin: Master of Flame, which shows how Shishio Makoto met Komagata Yumi and formed the Juppongatana, followed in Jump SQ. in 2014. From August 9–11, 2013, an exhibit of art from Rurouni Kenshin was displayed at Otakon in the United States curated by Watsuki's wife. Watsuki and his wife collaborated on the two-chapter Rurouni Kenshin Side Story: The Ex-Con Ashitaro for the ninth anniversary of Jump SQ. in 2016. The second chapter revealed that the story is a prequel to a new arc of the series; Rurouni Kenshin: The Hokkaido Arc which began in fall 2017.

=== Child pornography charges ===
In November 2017, police found DVDs with footage of naked girls in their early teens in Watsuki's Tokyo office. Tokyo Police raided Watsuki's home as part of an investigation into the purchase of child pornography. The search uncovered about a hundred child pornography DVDs. He was referred to prosecutors over possession of child pornography on November 21. The serialization of Rurouni Kenshin: The Hokkaido Arc was put on hiatus after the details of Watsuki's charges were made public. In February 2018, Watsuki was fined ¥200,000 (about US$1,900). The Hokkaido Arc resumed serialization in June 2018.

== Influences and inspirations ==
Watsuki started drawing from the influence of his older brother. He named Osamu Tezuka's Black Jack as his favorite manga and Takeshi Obata as his favorite artist. Other series that influenced him include Fujiko F. Fujio's Doraemon and Pa-man, Mitsuru Adachi's Touch, Wing Man by Masakazu Katsura, Minako Narita's Alien Street and Cypher, and YuYu Hakusho by Yoshihiro Togashi. Watsuki said that he is not very good at writing comedy, but stated that he does not give up on it because laughter contains "smiles and happiness, the greatest common denominators."

Watsuki based many of his characters on historical figures, characters from other manga/anime, and video games series. For example, Himura Kenshin was based on Kawakami Gensai, one of the Four Hitokiri of the Bakumatsu. Four years after the revolution ended, Gensai was falsely accused of a crime and was executed. Watsuki admires Kenshin for his desire to do good in honor of those whom he had to kill so the Meiji Government could exist. In addition, Saitō Hajime was based on the historical Saitō Hajime, a member of the Shinsengumi although Watsuki admitted altering him to the point of fan complaints. Several other characters, most notably Sagara Sanosuke, Shinomori Aoshi, and Seta Sōjirō, are also loosely based on certain figures among the Shinsengumi. Okita Sōji, Ōkubo Toshimichi, and Katsura Kogorō are among numerous other historical figures who make appearances in the story. Yukishiro Enishi's minion Gein was based on grave robber and double murderer Ed Gein.

== Works ==
=== Serialized manga ===
Rurouni Kenshin
Crescent Moon in the Warring States (戦国の三日月, Sengoku no Mikazuki)
Rurouni: Meiji Swordsman Romantic Story (るろうに -明治剣客浪漫譚-, Rurōni -Meiji Kenkaku Roman Tan-; 1992)
Rurouni: Meiji Swordsman Romantic Story (1993)
Rurouni Kenshin: Meiji Swordsman Romantic Story (るろうに剣心 -明治剣客浪漫譚-, Rurōni Kenshin Meiji Kenkaku Rōman Tan; 1994–1999)
Haru ni Sakura (春に桜; "Cherry Blossoms in Spring", 1999)
Yahiko no Sakabatō (弥彦の逆刃刀; "Yahiko's Reversed-Edge Sword")
Rurouni Kenshin: Restoration Act Zero: The Prologue (るろうに剣心 -明治剣客浪漫譚- 第零幕, Rurōni Kenshin -Meiji Kenkaku Roman Tan- Dai Rei-maku; 2012)
Rurouni Kenshin: Restoration (るろうに剣心-キネマ版, Rurōni Kenshin Cinema-ban; 2012–2013)
Rurouni Kenshin: Master of Flame (炎を統べる -るろうに剣心・裏幕-, Honō wo Suberu Rurōni Kenshin Uramaku-; 2014)
Rurouni Kenshin Side Story: The Ex-Con Ashitaro (-るろうに剣心・異聞-明日郎 前科アリ, Rurōni Kenshin Ibun: Ashitarō Zenka Ari; 2016)
Rurouni Kenshin: The Hokkaido Arc (るろうに剣心 -明治剣客浪漫譚・北海道編-, Rurōni Kenshin Meiji Kenkaku Roman Tan Hokkaidō-hen; 2017–present)
Gun Blaze West (2001)
Buso Renkin (武装錬金, Busō Renkin; 2003–2005)
Embalming
Embalming -Dead Body and Bride- (エンバーミング -DEAD BODY and BRIDE-; 2005)
Embalming II -Dead Body and Lover- (エンバーミングII -DEAD BODY and LOVER-; 2006)
Embalming -The Another Tale of Frankenstein- (エンバーミング -THE ANOTHER TALE OF FRANKENSTEIN-, Enbāmingu -Ji Anazā Teiru obu Furankenshutain-; 2007–2015)

=== Other manga ===
- Teacher Pon (ティーチャー・ポン; 1987)
- Hokuriku Yūrei Kobanashi (北陸幽霊小話)
- Meteor Strike (メテオ ストライク, Meteo Sutoraiku)
- Robot Arms (ろぼっと・アームズ) a dōjinshi illustrated by Watsuki and written by Kaworu Kurosaki.

=== Video game designs ===
- Samurai Shodown V (2003)
- Shinsengumi Gunraw Den (2005)

=== Other work ===
- Buso Renkin (2006) – Voice of Buhiro Watsukino in episode 7.
- Endride (2016) – Character designs
