= Rurouni Kenshin: Restoration =

Japanese manga series

- First tankōbon volume cover, featuring Himura Kenshin

るろうに剣心 -特筆版- (Rurōni Kenshin Tokuhitsu-ban)
- Genre: Adventure; Martial arts
- Manga
- Written by: Nobuhiro Watsuki
- Published by: Shueisha
- English publisher: NA: Viz Media
- Imprint: Jump Comics SQ.
- Magazine: Jump Square
- English magazine: NA: Weekly Shonen Jump
- Original run: May 2, 2012 – June 4, 2013
- Volumes: 2
- icon

Rurouni Kenshin: Restoration (Japanese: るろうに剣心 -特筆版-, Hepburn: Rurōni Kenshin Tokuhitsu-ban; lit. 'Rurouni Kenshin: Special Edition') is a Japanese manga series written and illustrated by Nobuhiro Watsuki. It is a retelling of his Rurouni Kenshin series, and served to promote the then upcoming live-action film released in August 2012. The manga was serialized in Shueisha's Jump Square from May 2012 to June 2013 under the title Rurouni Kenshin: Kinema-ban (るろうに剣心 -キネマ版-, Rurōni Kenshin Kinema-ban; lit. 'Rurouni Kenshin: Cinema Version'), before its title was changed when it was collected into two tankōbon volumes.

In North America, Viz Media licensed the manga for English-language release and serialized it on their digital magazine Weekly Shonen Jump. The two volumes were released in June 2013 and January 2014. Critical response to the manga has been positive, with praise focused on its fight scenes, though the narrative in general was the subject of mixed opinions, with critics either finding it too light or dark based on the fight scenes. Nevertheless, Watsuki's art was the subject of praise, including his character designs and fight sequences.

== Plot ==
Himura Kenshin stumbles upon gambling fights hosted by the merchant Takeda Kanryū. One of the fighters is Kamiya Kaoru who participates in the fights to be able to pay the rent from her swordsmanship school. After learning that Kanryū plans to kill Kaoru, Myōjin Yahiko requests Kenshin's help to save her. Kenshin defeats Kanryū and stays in Kaoru's dojo with Yahiko for an unknown reason. Wishing revenge, Kanryū hires multiple fighters to defeat Kenshin. The first of them, Sagara Sanosuke, is defeated by Kenshin who convinces him to help taking care of Kaoru's dojo. Shortly afterwards one of Kenshin's old enemies from the Bakumatsu, the Shinsegumi Saitō Hajime, takes Sanosuke's job.

Saitō is revealed to be living now as a policeman working as an agent investigating Takeda's crimes and thus only interacts with Kenshin. However, Takeda keeps sending more assassins to get his revenge on Kenshin who is protected by Sanosuke and Yahiko. The maniac former Shinsengumi Udo Jin-e kidnaps Kaoru and attempts to kill her to corrupt Kenshin, sending him back to his hitokiri persona in combat. Before Kenshin is about to murder Jin-e in rage, Kaoru manages to stop him, having survived to the former Shinsengumi's attack. Jin-e commits suicide while Kenshin returns to the Kamiya Kasshin Ryu dojo where he starts living.

== Production ==
Nobuhiro Watsuki stated that the impetus to draw Rurouni Kenshin again after more than a decade was the green-lighting of the live-action film adaptation, though he had always personally desired to return to the series. The opportunity to create new material for both longtime fans and potential new readers led him to "grab [his] pen again." Although Watsuki was working for Jump Square, there was debate over whether to publish the new work in Weekly Shōnen Jump, where the original manga had been serialized. However, as the magazine's focus was on its current series and new authors, it was decided that a one-shot would be published in Weekly Shōnen Jump and a short series would run in Jump Square.

For the short series, Watsuki knew many fans wanted the Hokkaido arc, which had previously been drafted but never completed. He explained that the original manga ended because its core theme had been concluded, and being unable to devise a new one, he felt there was "just no way" to write that arc. (Watsuki later began The Hokkaido Arc in 2016.) His next concept was a sequel focusing on the next generation, either centering on Yahiko or combining Kenshin's son Kenji and Yahiko's son Shinya for a story titled Ken - Shin. However, he concluded this would not be about the original Kenshin and, while acceptable as a continuation, was unsuitable for Restoration. A prequel was also considered, but he realized it would exclude Kenshin's friends, making that idea better for a one-shot. His final concept was a "parallel story", defined as an alternate or separate narrative that serves as a "pleasant gimmick" to enjoy the work in a different form, though he noted a character's foundation cannot be altered without making it "fake." Among ideas rejected for the film script was a thirty-week story set "before Rurouni", which he described as a "story based on a template." Watsuki deemed this idea "worthy of another Kenshin story" and fitting for promoting the film, which became the basis for Rurouni Kenshin: Restoration.

Watsuki's primary consideration was what to change besides the structure. He described writing a serial manga as assembling a "multi-layered three-dimensional puzzle", an organic process where the final form is not clear until completion. As Restoration had already been "built" once, he found the process more akin to a one-shot or a "flat puzzle." He aimed to express more of Kenshin's inner feelings, comparing Kenshin's original role to that of Kōmon in Mito Kōmon or Yoshimune in Abarenbō Shōgun, where supporting characters built the drama and the hero defeated villains. This made it easier to express the thoughts of surrounding characters rather than Kenshin's own. Attempting to "dig deeper" into Kenshin's psyche proved difficult; while the art was not challenging, the story grew gloomier due to Kenshin's regrets. By chapter four, Watsuki grew concerned it would resemble the Jinchū Arc of the original manga and abandoned this deeper exploration.

=== Character changes ===
In Restoration, Watsuki attempted to express more of Kenshin's inner conflict as a man who helped usher in a peaceful era but could not find his place due to past actions, using a "pool of blood" theme. He described this version as slightly more immature, reserved, and excitable, and "perhaps he isn't too hero-like." The depiction of Hiten Mitsurugi-ryū and its techniques was altered for fun, a change significant enough that the editorial office received a phone call about it. Kenshin's most noticeable visual changes are a white scarf—"scarf = hero"—and his cross-shaped scar, which is left white but shaded black when his Battōsai persona emerges. Watsuki also noted that his current art style made it difficult to capture Kenshin's original bushy hair until the end of the project.

With Kenshin being more immature, Watsuki made Kaoru slightly more mature, incorporating some "older sister" qualities. Acknowledging a modern "aversion" to violent heroines, he removed her violent expressions when confronting others. Her most significant physical change is the lack of a part in her bangs. To emphasize her role as a female swordsman, she wears a kimono and hakama.

Watsuki stated that Yahiko underwent the most growth in Restoration. Originally created to provide a child's perspective in a shōnen manga with an adult protagonist, the realization that Weekly Shōnen Jump's main demographic was middle and high school students—slightly older than Yahiko—and that his readers were older still, led Watsuki to evolve the character through the story. Yahiko's hair was shortened to distinguish it from Sanosuke's, and his pupils were drawn smaller with a more menacing look in the first half to make his growth more apparent.

For Sanosuke, Watsuki struggled with how much of his Sekihō Army background to include, as it was a major part of his character but unrelated to the story. Length restrictions led to only a brief mention, which Watsuki found disappointing. The most notable visual change is the addition of red knuckle gloves to emphasize his bare-knuckle fighting style, along with a "touch" of Kamen Rider 2.

For Saitō, whose role as Kenshin's comrade connected by a strange friendship remained, Watsuki felt condensing the story strengthened their bond. His uniform was made more historically accurate thanks to available reference material, unlike during the original's creation. Jin-e was initially given a motive for attacking Kenshin rather than sheer madness, which Watsuki called a miscalculation as it reduced the character's level of insanity. Omitting Jin-e's Shin no Ippō technique for being too supernatural also diminished a excitement unique to shōnen manga, another miscalculation. Changing Jin-e's skin tone to increase his oddity made consistent tonality difficult. Watsuki concluded that "the original version of Jin-e is the perfect and the ultimate."

As Kanryū is the final antagonist in both Restoration and the live-action film, Watsuki did not plan major changes initially. However, Teruyuki Kagawa's "fanatical" portrayal in the film influenced the character. Kanryū's glasses were made round for a more Meiji-era feel, though Watsuki felt square glasses better suited his apathetic nature. Banjin and Gein's roles were changed so drastically that Watsuki used their versions from Kenshin Saihitsu.

=== Act Zero production ===
Watsuki had five goals for the prequel one-shot: ensure it was enjoyable for new Weekly Shōnen Jump readers unfamiliar with the original, please existing fans, fill in a missed story element, include a never-before-used element, and connect the ending to the first chapter of Restoration. To achieve the first goal, he limited pre-existing characters to Kenshin, used a familiar story structure, and added comedy. For the second, he connected a flashback scene to an ending spread featuring characters from the kanzenban edition covers. To address the third goal, he elaborated on why Kenshin, after wandering for ten years, stopped in the First Act; in Act Zero, Elder notices Kenshin's unhealed emotional scar, and her advice slightly affects him, motivating his actions in the first chapter. The never-before-used element was a Western character, added despite the series' setting in an era of modernization, and the one-shot is set in Yokohama's foreign settlement, which Watsuki visited for research. To tie into Restoration's first chapter, he used recurring series narration. Watsuki struggled with these points until a dinner with Hisashi Sasaki, his first editor on the original series; during the cab ride, they devised the framework in 15 minutes. Watsuki noted that Rurouni Kenshin would not have been possible without Sasaki.

The character Elder, who might seem gimmicky, resulted from extensive planning. When Watsuki needed a heroine for Kenshin to save, a doctor to give advice, a Western character, and a character pursued by villains, his wife, novelist Kaworu Kurosaki, suggested combining them into one character—a pretty girl hiding behind a mask. To offset the gimmick, her design was kept plain. Her name comes from a medicinal herb, and she is a distant, unacquainted relative of Hildegard Peaberry from Embalming: The Another Tale of Frankenstein.

Asahiyama Dankichi was initially conceived as a soldier and lover or elder brother of a heroine, but once Elder was decided, he became a guide familiar with the foreign settlement and one of her few allies. His macho rickshawman personality nearly overshadowed the protagonist, requiring a reduced role. His surname comes from a mountain in Watsuki's hometown, and his given name "had to be" Dankichi because he pulls a rickshaw. Watsuki noted his design was impromptu and regretted inconsistencies in his face and hairstyle across frames.

Espiral originated from the idea of Kenshin facing a Western sword style. He was initially planned as more of a rival than a villain—someone who, living in the West where the sword was obsolete, traveled to Japan to fight a samurai, then changed his ways and became Elder's bodyguard upon returning West. However, this epilogue would have taken up roughly an eighth of the page count, so he was simplified into a villain. Watsuki felt this was best for the one-shot but a "pity." His name is Spanish for "spiral", and all his techniques relate to that concept. His design is essentially Kenshin's opposite: short black hair, white top, black pants, and a long glove on his right arm to emphasize his dominant hand.

== Publication ==
In December 2011, Shueisha announced that Watsuki would be putting his Embalming manga series on hold to begin a "reboot" of Rurouni Kenshin, called Rurouni Kenshin: Kinema-ban, as a tie-in to the then upcoming live-action film. The series began in Jump Square on May 2, 2012, and ended on June 4, 2013. It was created to honor the anniversary of the anime series and the release of the live-action film. Inspired by the film, Watsuki wanted to reintroduce Kenshin's character in a new manga. He thought about redesigning the cast but decided to stay true to the originals' looks. Instead he made subtle changes including Kenshin's scarf and Saitō wearing a more realistic outfit.

The reboot depicts the battles that are featured in the first live-action film, with differences. A special chapter, titled Rurouni Kenshin: Meiji Swordsman Romantic Story: Act Zero (るろうに剣心 -明治剣客浪漫譚- 第零幕, Rurōni Kenshin -Meiji Kenkaku Roman Tan- Dai Rei-maku), was published in Weekly Shōnen Jump on August 20, 2012, as a prologue to Restoration and included in its first volume. Shueisha collected the chapters in two tankōbon volumes, released on September 4, 2012, and July 4, 2013. Restoration and Act Zero were also collected in Rurouni Kenshin: Another Story, published on November 17, 2023, which also includes Rurouni Kenshin: Master of Flame.

A light novel adaptation of Restoration, titled Rurouni Kenshin -Ginmaku Sōshihen- (るろうに剣心 ―銀幕草紙変―), written by Watsuki's wife Kaworu Kurosaki, was released on September 4, 2012. Watsuki said it utilizes one of the rejected ideas she had for the live-action film. It is a version of Restoration's New Kurogasa (Jin-E) Arc, featuring Inui Banjin and a different younger Gein, both members of Yukishiro Enishi's team in the Jinchū Arc of the original Rurouni Kenshin manga.

On May 7, 2012, it was announced in Viz Media's digital manga magazine Weekly Shonen Jump Alpha that Rurouni Kenshin: Kinema-ban would join its line-up, under the title Rurouni Kenshin: Restoration. It ran from May 21, 2012, to June 10, 2013, while Act Zero was published on September 4, 2012. Viz Media released the first volume on June 4, 2013, and the second was published on January 14, 2014.

=== Volumes ===
No.	Title	Original release date	English release date
1	Rurouni Kenshin: Restoration, Volume 1 Rurōni Kenshin Tokuhitsu-ban Jōkan (るろうに剣心─特筆版─ 上巻)	September 4, 2012; 978-4-08-870509-5	June 4, 2013; 978-1-4215-5231-6
Act 1. "The Story Begins" (浪漫譚の始まり, Romantan no Hajimari; "The Beginning of the Romantic Tale"); Act 2. "The Fight Merchant" (喧嘩屋, Kenkaya; "Fighter"); Act 3. "Whereabouts of Justice (Part 1)" (正義の行方（前編）, Seigi no Yukue (Zenpen)); The Prologue: "Act Zero" (第零幕, Dai Zero Maku)
The Prologue takes place in Yokohama, five days before the beginning of Restoration. Kenshin encounters a masked, traveling Western doctor known as Elder who treats people for free, thus becoming the target of hired goons by the local doctor, Ishizu Deian, who only treats the wealthy. When Kenshin saves the masked doctor, Ishizu recruits the Western assassin Espiral.
2	Rurouni Kenshin: Restoration, Volume 2 Rurōni Kenshin Tokuhitsu-ban Gekan (るろうに剣心─特筆版─ 下巻)	July 4, 2013; 978-4-08-870655-9	January 14, 2014; 978-1-4215-5570-6
Act 4. "Whereabouts of Justice (Part 2)" (正義の行方（後編）, Seigi no Yukue (Kōhen)); Act 5. "At Akabeko" (赤べこにて, Akabeko nite); Act 6. "The Light of Meiji" (明治の光, Meiji no Hikari); Act 7. "Stormy Winds" (暴風, Bōfū); Act 8. "Eve of Convergence" (収束前, Shūsoku Mae); Act 9. "Sacrifice" (生贄, Ikenie); Final Chapter: "In the New Era" (新時代の中へ―, Shin Jidai no Naka e)

== Reception ==
In a review about the series' reboot, Publishers Weekly praised the manga for appealing to both newcomers as well as old fans of Rurouni Kenshin. The reviewer also noted the manga had light parts during its comedy which he found strange in the samurai genre. Kat Kan of Voice of Youth Advocates shared similar feelings, but suggested it to try it for older teens rather than children as a result of its violent content. Rebecca Silverman from Anime News Network praised the reboot for the focus on Kenshin and Yahiko's development but criticized Kaoru and Saito for lacking focus. Chris Beveridge appreciated the fight scenes, most notably due to how they are presented in this retelling as Sanosuke is stronger than in the original manga, making his duel with Kenshin more enjoyable. Although ICv2 enjoyed the reboot, the writer had mixed thoughts about the speech patterns given towards Kenshin but still praised his heroic persona. Leroy Douresseaux was more negative, finding the Takeda's arc boring and the plot in general too lighthearted for a shōnen manga. Manga News enjoyed how Watsuki managed to retell a storyline from the original series in only two volumes. Matthew Warner from the Fandom Post stated that the reboot managed to distance itself from the first manga based on how different are the fights and praised Yahiko's character arc in his battle.

The artwork was praised by ICv2 for how Watsuki handles fight scenes among side other details. Douresseaux liked Watsuki's character designs, most notably Kenshin's describing it as "colorful" among other "misfits". Silverman praised how Watsuki's art in general has improved ever since his previous Buso Renkin making the characters more attractive than the original manga alongside other backgrounds as well perform better fight scenes. Manga News found the character designs appealing, citing mostly the Western based, due to how distinctive they are despite franchise' older origins.

In Japan, the manga was well received, with the second volume reaching 82,898 sales. Similarly, the manga appeared in The New York Times sales from North America. Both Watsuki and the editorial staff were surprised by how well-received Act Zero was by readers and how high it ranked in the reader surveys. The chapter was later adapted into episodes 20 and 21 of the 2023 Rurouni Kenshin anime series.
