= Rurouni Kenshin: The Hokkaido Arc =

Japanese manga series

- First tankōbon volume cover, featuring Himura Kenshin (front) and Hasegawa Ashitaro (back)

るろうに剣心 ─明治剣客浪漫譚・北海道編─ (Rurōni Kenshin -Meiji Kenkaku Roman Tan Hokkaidō-hen-)
- Genre: Adventure; Martial arts
- Manga

Rurouni Kenshin Side Story: The Ex-Con Ashitaro
- Written by: Nobuhiro Watsuki; Kaworu Kurosaki
- Illustrated by: Nobuhiro Watsuki
- Published by: Shueisha
- English publisher: NA: Viz Media
- Magazine: Jump Square
- English magazine: NA: Weekly Shonen Jump; (rescinded)
- Original run: November 4, 2016 – December 2, 2016
- Manga
- Written by: Nobuhiro Watsuki; Kaworu Kurosaki
- Illustrated by: Nobuhiro Watsuki
- Published by: Shueisha
- English publisher: NA: Viz Media
- Imprint: Jump Comics SQ.
- Magazine: Jump Square
- English magazine: NA: Weekly Shonen Jump; (rescinded)
- Original run: September 4, 2017 – present
- Volumes: 10
- icon

Rurouni Kenshin: The Hokkaido Arc (Japanese: るろうに剣心 ─明治剣客浪漫譚・北海道編─, Hepburn: Rurōni Kenshin: Meiji Kenkaku Roman Tan Hokkaidō-hen) (Note: "The Epic Tale of a Meiji Swordsman: The Wanderer, Kenshin — The Hokkaido Arc". The word Rurōni (るろうに) is the author's altered reading of the word Rurōnin (流浪人), which means 'wanderer'.) is a Japanese manga series written and illustrated by Nobuhiro Watsuki. His wife, Kaworu Kurosaki, is credited as a story consultant. It is a direct sequel to Rurouni Kenshin and follows Himura Kenshin and his friends in 1883 Japan as they traverse Hokkaido in search of his father-in-law.

It has been serialized monthly in Shueisha's shōnen manga magazine Jump Square since September 2017, with the chapters collected in ten tankōbon volumes as of January 2026. North American publisher Viz Media released the series digitally in Weekly Shonen Jump simultaneously as it ran in Japan until November 2017.

== Plot ==
In 1883, Himura Kenshin, having married Kamiya Kaoru, became a father to Himura Kenji and, with his body deteriorating, still fights for those in need. Former criminals Inoue Aran and Hasegawa Ashitaro, the latter a former member of Shishio Makoto's faction, have become live-in students at the Kamiya Dojo in Tokyo. Kubota Asahi, a member of the Yaminobu, also starts living at the dojo. The Yaminobu accidentally left behind a recent photograph taken in Hokkaido of Kaoru's father, Kamiya Koshijirō, who was thought to have died in the Seinan War. After reacquiring his sakabatō or reversed-edge sword from Myōjin Yahiko, Kenshin, his family, and the new residents of Kamiya Dojo head to Hokkaido to find Koshijirō.

There, they reunite with Sagara Sanosuke and team up with Saitō Hajime when they get involved in stopping the mysterious group named Kenkaku Heiki, who create havoc throughout Japan to gain battle experience to protect the country from foreign threats. Saitō recruits his former comrade Nagakura Shinpachi and former Juppongatana members Seta Sōjirō, Yūkyūzan Anji, Sawagejō Chō, Honjō Kamatari and Kariwa Henya to aid them.

== Characters ==
Himura Kenshin (緋村剣心)

The former legendary assassin known as Hitokiri Battōsai, Kenshin now lives peacefully with his family. His body is deteriorating due to continuously using the Hiten Mitsurugi style of swordsmanship. After being given back his sakabatō from Myōjin Yahiko, Kenshin continues to protect the weak for as long as his body will hold up.
Hasegawa Ashitarō (長谷川明日郎)
An orphaned 16-year-old boy just released from prison. Born in Niigata Prefecture, he survived by stealing crops and foraging the mountains. Although claiming to have served five years in a Tokyo prison for dine and dash, it is suspected to have been for being a gofer member of Shishio Makoto's faction, which planned to take over Japan before disbanding when their leader died five years ago. He possesses Shishio's sword, Mugenjin, but Kenshin asks him not to draw it due to his propensity for entering uncontrolled fits of rage. Ashitaro's given name was formerly written as 悪太郎 ("evil child") before he changed it to 明日郎 ("tomorrow's child").
Inoue Aran (井上阿爛)
A 16-year-old boy who grew up in the Westernized portion of Japan. He was jailed in Tokyo for three months for attempting to be a stowaway on a ship to the Americas. He is revealed to be half-Japanese with blond hair and suspected to be the son of a prostitute to foreigners.
Kubota Asahi (久保田旭)
A war orphan raised by the Yaminobu but claims to be a pacifist. Following their failure to kill Kenshin during the Bakumatsu, the Yaminobu lost status and were reduced to working as mercenaries for hire. Shishio's faction hired Kubota and later trailed Ashitaro to retrieve Shishio's sword.
Kenkaku Heiki (劍客兵器)
A mysterious group that claims to have been initially formed by ancestors in the Kamakura period who stopped the Mongol invasions of Japan. Having stayed hidden for over 500 years, they take over Mount Hakodate and launch other attacks in Japan to gain battle experience to fend off future foreign invasions.

== Production ==
In the final tankōbon volume of the original Rurouni Kenshin series, published in November 1999, creator Nobuhiro Watsuki stated he had concepts for a "Hokkaido episode, a sequel", but chose to conclude the series to begin a new manga. In September 2012, Watsuki revealed he had considered drawing the Hokkaido arc before creating Rurouni Kenshin: Restoration, but felt there was "just no way" to proceed as the series' core themes had concluded and he could not devise a new one. Following the positive reception of the live-action film and the conclusion of Restoration in July 2013, Watsuki noted the numerous requests for a continuation from both himself and fans, expressing a desire to "continue expanding its world for a little while longer", though he was undecided on returning to the manga format.

Watsuki was initially hesitant to have Kenshin fight again after the character's peaceful conclusion as a family man. An early draft of what became the Hokkaido Arc was planned for inclusion in Restoration, but was abandoned after Watsuki's wife, Kaworu Kurosaki, found its ending unsatisfactory; she later assisted with research for the new series. Concerned that the series' dark themes would no longer suit the shōnen manga demographic, Watsuki had originally ended the manga with the Jinchu arc. His decision to create the reboot, Restoration, was influenced by the live-action films, though he still had no plans for the Hokkaido story. After watching the Rurouni Kenshin musical, he resolved to begin Hokkaido after completing Embalming. To maintain the tone of the original, Watsuki introduced new characters treated kindly by Kenshin and Kaoru.

Collaborating with the staff of the live-action films The Final and The Beginning provided Watsuki with new ideas for giving Kenshin's story a conclusive happy ending despite his hitokiri past. He noted that Takeru Satoh's portrayal of Kenshin was stronger than the manga version, particularly in The Final, and reflected that Kenshin's pacifism—a trait shared with other Weekly Shōnen Jump protagonists like Monkey D. Luffy and Naruto Uzumaki—would continue in The Hokkaido Arc, with Kenshin sparing his enemies.

On November 4, 2016, Watsuki began a two-chapter spin-off, Rurouni Kenshin Side Story: The Ex-Con Ashitaro (-るろうに剣心・異聞- 明日郎 前科アリ, Rurouni Kenshin Ibun: Ashitarō Zenka Ari), in Jump Square. Inspired by buddy films and series like Ushio & Tora, the spin-off introduced a new protagonist, Ashitaro, whom Watsuki created to embody the youthful traits of the now-mature Myojin Yahiko. The second chapter, published on December 2, 2016, revealed the story was a prologue to a new Rurouni Kenshin arc scheduled to begin in spring 2017. After a delay to summer, Rurouni Kenshin: The Hokkaido Arc began serialization in Jump Square on September 4, 2017. The launch was promoted with advertisements in Shinjuku Station.

On November 21, 2017, Watsuki was charged with possession of child pornography. Later that day, Shueisha suspended publication of new chapters, effective December 4, 2017. Serialization resumed in Jump Square on June 4, 2018. The series went on hiatus in June 2021, resuming that August. In September 2024, the series entered another hiatus due to Watsuki's poor health, and resumed on July 4, 2025. In November 2025, it was announced that the series would be on hiatus until the March 2026 issue of Jump Square.

== Publication ==
The two parts of Rurouni Kenshin Side Story: The Ex-Con Ashitaro were published on November 4 and December 2, 2016, in Shueisha's Jump Square. Rurouni Kenshin: The Hokkaido Arc began monthly publication in the same magazine on September 4, 2017. Shueisha has collected the chapters into individual tankōbon volumes. The first volume was released on September 4, 2018. As of January 5, 2026, ten volumes have been released.

Viz Media released an English translation of The Ex-Con Ashitaro in their digital Weekly Shonen Jump magazine. The first part was released on December 19, 2016, and the second on January 2, 2017. On September 4, 2017, they began simultaneously publishing The Hokkaido Arc in the magazine as it ran in Japan. Following Watsuki's being charged, Viz Media did not continue English publication when the series resumed in Japan, making its last appearance in the magazine on November 6, 2017.

=== Volumes ===
No.	Japanese release date	Japanese ISBN
1	September 4, 2018	978-4-08-881324-0
Prologue. "The Ex-Con Ashitaro Part 1" (明日郎前科アリ 前編, Ashitarō Zenka Ari Zenpen); Prologue. "The Ex-Con Ashitaro Part 2" (明日郎前科アリ 後編, Ashitarō Zenka Ari Kōhen); Act 1. "Meiji 16 — Kamiya Dojo" (明治十六年 神谷道場, Meiji Jūroku-nen Kamiya Dōjō); Act 2. "Mount Hakodate Battle" (函館山 交戦, Hakodateyama Kōsen); Act 3. "Yahiko's Sword" (弥彦の刀, Yahiko no Katana)
After being released from prison, the two young men, Hasegawa Ashitarō and Inoue Aran, look for meals in Tokyo and are observed by a girl named Kubota Asahi. However, they are constantly attacked by Asahi's superiors who search for a treasure Ashitaro hides, a sword that belongs to the hitokiri Shishio Makoto. When Ashitaro tries to kill his enemies in rage for the mistreatment of Aran's culture, the swordsman Himura Kenshin saves them through a duel. Kenshin and his wife, Kamiya Kaoru, offer to live in their dojo to protect Ashitaro, Aran, and Asahi. Kenshin recognizes Shishio's sword from their mortal duel and has to force the young man to avoid using violence, especially with such weapons. However, the plans change when Kaoru finds a picture of her absent father, Koshijiro, originally believed to be dead. The journey to Koshijiro takes them to Hokkaido, where the police officers led by Saito Hajime face an unknown enemy. Kaoru's student Myojin Yahiko gives Kenshin the original reversed-edged sword to aid him and stays in the Kamiya Kasshin Ryu dojo while his friends leave.
2	February 4, 2019	978-4-08-881736-1
Act 4. "Who is He?" (誰, Dare); Act 5. "Tamoto Photo Studio" (田本写真館, Tamoto Shashin-kan); Act 6. "Gatotsu! Gatotsu! Gatotsu!" (牙突！牙突！牙突！); Act 7. "Itekura's Interrogation Part 1" (凍座尋問・前編, Itekura Jinmon Zenpen); Act 8. "Itekura's Interrogation Part 2" (凍座尋問・後編, Itekura Jinmon Kōhen); Act 9. "Assault on Kabato Prison" (樺戸集治監強襲, Kabato Shūchikan Kyōshū)
While resting in Hokkaido, Kenshin meets his old friend Sagara Sanosuke, who decides to help him find Koshijiro, but Asahi disappears. Kenshin, Kaoru, Sanosuke, and the child Himura Kenji, son of Kenshin and Kaoru, research the photograph's origin while Ashitaro and Aran look for Asahi. The group learns of a recent incident in Mt. Hakodate where Saito was severely wounded in combat by Itekura Byakuya, as reported by his adopted son Mishima Eiji. Kenshin accepts Eiji's request to protect the area from Itekura's forces, the Kenkaku Heiki, though the leader allows himself to be arrested and only demands a warrior. Kenshin decides to interrogate Itekura in the Gorokyaku Star Front. There, Kenshin meets Itekura, who reveals their group originates from the ages of Kamakura, fighting against the Mongol invasion and aiming to defeat any other invasion from the country using brute force.
3	August 2, 2019	978-4-08-882032-3
Act 10. "Asahi's Identity" (旭の正体, Asahi no Shōtai); Act 11. "Haskap Mochi" (はしかぷ餅, Hasukapu Mochi); Act 12. "Mutual Understanding" (意気投合, Ikitōgō); Act 13. "Telegraph Hakodate–Kyoto" (電信 函館-京都, Denshin Hakodate-Kyōto); Act 14. "Gathering" (集いし者達); Act 15. "There is Much to Discuss..." (積もる話もあるんだろうね); Act 16. "You Are!!!!" (お前はァ！！！！)
Ashitaro and Aran find Asahi, who does not trust Kenshin after learning he is a hitokiri from the Bakumatsu, Battosai, who fought her superior, the Yaminobu, and killed his first wife in the process. Despite fearing Kenshin will kill her upon learning her identity, Asahi is comforted when he and Kaoru claim they do not care about her past. Meanwhile, several former warriors come to Hokadote to aid Kenshin in his fight against the Kenkaku Heiki. Saito contacts the former members of Shishio's men, Seta Sojiro, Kamatari, Henya, and Cho. Saito also calls for his former Shinsengumi ally Nagakura Shinpachi, who fought Kenshin during the Bakumatsu. However, Kenshin demands Eiji's removal from the team as Shishio's forces kill his family, resulting in his desire for revenge.
4	May 13, 2020 (Note: Volume 4 was delayed from May 1 to May 13 due to the COVID-19 pandemic.)	978-4-08-882261-7
Act 17. "Fighting Spirit" (闘姿); Act 18. "Itekura's Fierce Attack" (凍座猛攻); Act 19. "Product of Hell" (地獄の産物, Jigoku no Sanbutsu); Act 20. "End of the Interrogation" (尋問終了, Jinmon Shūryō); Act 21. "Status Report from Hakodate" (近況報告 函館より, Kinkyō Hōkoku Hakodate yori); Act 22. "Arrival in Otaru" (小樽到着, Otaru Tōchaku); Act 23. "Follow the Gatou Sword!" (雅桐刀を追え！)
Kenshin confronts Itekura once again to ask for information, but he only accepts at the cost of one battle to test his strength. Itekura displays a phenomenal physique; while Kenshin can dodge most attacks, he cannot deal significant damage with his Hiten Mitsurugi style. Eiji briefly interrupts the duel and declares he will join Saito's group. Kenshin then continues fighting Itekura until both fall to their knees due to reaching their limits, abruptly ending the ongoing interrogation. Before falling, Itekura said the new battle will be in Otaru. Following Kenshin's recovery, the group splits into three to battle in Otaru, Hakodate, and Sapporo. Before Kenshin leaves to fight again, Kaoru asks him to take their first family picture with Kenji as she has to take off their son. Upon arriving in Otaru, Kenshin and Sanosuke investigate the rise of new swords known as Gatou.
5	December 4, 2020	978-4-08-882478-9
Act 24. "That Man, Gatou!" (その男 雅桐！); Act 25. "That Man, Kanryū!" (その男 観柳！); Act 26. "Value of Money" (金の価値); Act 27. "Ezo Spruce Cones" (エゾマツの球果); Act 28. "Breaking Futae no Kiwami" (二重の極み破れたり); Act 29. "Infiltration: Otaru Base!" (潜入・小樽拠点！); Act 30. "How to End a Fight" (喧嘩の締め)
Ashitaro, Asahi, and Aran find Gatou, whom Kenshin and Sanosuke remember as the merchant Kanryu Takeda. Aran takes a liking to Kanryu's business and decides to teach him. Though Kenshin's group remains calm, they change their minds about Kanryu when they learn he is also making firepower. As they wonder if Kanryu is really the reason for such a weapon, they are attacked by a Kenkaku Heiki Ono Tominaka member. Sanosuke battles Ono while Kenshin investigates the handling of the new guns. As he investigates the area, Aran learns of the Kenkaku Heiki base. Kanryu, Ashitaro, and Aran enter the base while Sanosuke defeats Ono, and Kenshin protects Otaru.
6	July 2, 2021	978-4-08-882673-8
Act 31. "Defeated Kanryū" (敗北の観柳); Act 32. "The Have-nots" (持たざる者); Act 33. "Farewell, My Beloved..." (さらば愛しの); Act 34. "Leaving Otaru" (小樽を去る); Act 35. "Otaru→Hakodate→Sapporo" (小樽→函館→札幌); Act 36. "Sapporo Shinsengumi Elegy Part 1: The Northern Capital and the Shinsengumi" (札幌新選組哀歌 其ノ一 北の都と新選組)
Ono receives a mortal wound from his ally Shimonji Rurio upon seeing him befriend Sanosuke. Kanryu and Alan sneak into the base, where Honda Udoku attacks them. The two fight Honda with enough firepower to make time for Kenshin to reach the place. Kanryu and Alane still face Honda with a gatling gun until defeating him with Alan and Ashitaro's help. Kenshin tells Kanryu that his former bodyguard, Shinomori Aoshi from the Oniwabanshu, is coming to Hokkaido, which causes Kanryu to escape. Upon reuniting with Sanosuke, they learn that Ono's last words involve how the Otaru unit plans to head to Hakodate. Meanwhile, in Sapporo, Saito and Nagakura face another Kenkaku Heiki member while Itekura remains in jail. The story moves to one week before as they meet the policeman, Ijikawa, who is also investigating the case.
7	May 2, 2022	978-4-08-883085-8
Act 37. "Sapporo Shinsengumi Elegy Part 2: Aburanokōji and Nagakura Shinpachi" (札幌新撰組哀歌 其ノニ 油小路と永倉新八); Act 38. "Sapporo Shinsengumi Elegy Part 3: The Northern Capital and Enemies, Enemies, Enemies" (札幌新選組哀歌 其ノ三 北の都と敵、敵、敵); Act 39. "Sapporo Shinsengumi Elegy Part 4: Aburanokōji and Saitō Hajime" (札幌新選組哀歌 其ノ四 油小路と斎藤一); Act 40. "Sapporo Shinsengumi Elegy Part 5: The House of Apples and Abe Jūrō" (札幌新選組哀歌 其ノ五 林檎の家と阿部十郎); Act 41. "Sapporo Shinsengumi Elegy Part 6: Kenkaku Heiki Hyōbe and the Main Street Battle" (札幌新撰組哀歌 其ノ六 大通りの攻防と劍客兵器 雹辺); Act 42. "Sapporo Shinsengumi Elegy Part 7: The Apple Orchard and Abe Jūrō" (札幌新撰組哀歌 其ノ七 林檎の園と阿部十郎)
The story briefly moves to the Bakumatsu, where the Shinsengumi are fighting traitors and meet the man who led their leader, Kondō Isami, to his death. As the Shinsengumi reflect on their past, Hyoube prepares to attack the city. During one fight, Hyoube starts killing police officers until Saito and Nagakura confront him. However, the battle is interrupted by former Shinsengumi Abe Jūrō, who aids his comrades.
8	January 4, 2023	978-4-08-883345-3
Act 43. "Sapporo Shinsengumi Elegy Part 8: The Northern Capital, Abe and Nagakura" (札幌新撰組哀歌 其ノ八 北の都と阿部と永倉); Act 44. "Sapporo Shinsengumi Elegy Part 9: The Sword of the Dragon Tail and Hyōbe Futatsu" (札幌新撰組哀歌 其ノ九 龍尾の剣と雹辺双); Act 45. "Sapporo Shinsengumi Elegy Pt. 10: The Shinsengumi and Two Hyōbe" (札幌新撰組哀歌 其ノ十 新撰組と雹辺二人); Act 46. "Sapporo Shinsengumi Elegy Pt. 11: The Northern District and Old Acquaintances" (札幌新撰組哀歌 其ノ十一 北の廓と昔馴染み); Act 47. "Sapporo Shinsengumi Elegy Pt. 12: The Capital of Love and Hate and the Shinsengumi" (札幌新撰組哀歌 其ノ十二 恩讐の都と新撰組); Act 48. "What is Beyond Persistence" (貫き通した先にあるのは); Act 49. "A Busy Visitor" (多忙な来訪者)
The former Shinsengumi continue fighting against the Keikaku's ally who has studied all of the famous fighters in history to be prepared for the fight. This results in Saito and Nakgaura fighting the man alone once their ally is overpowered. Nagakura reveals the masked man is actually two people posing and split to continue fighting: Hyobe Mataza and Hyobe Matasuke. Abe tries to join the fight but is aided by Eiji who guns down the enemy alongside the remaining policemen. Saito takes Mataza's sword to fight Matasuke. Following Matasuke's defeat, the former Shinsengumi rest in the city. Nagakura discovers Goro Maeno is an actual enemy but lets him leave. Shortly, after Saito is attacked by Usui Unounma's brother Itou Isagawa who seeks to avenge his brother's death and leaves him wounded. After learning of this report from Nagakura, Kenshin prepares for a new battle with Kenkaku Heiki whose allies appear.
9	November 2, 2023	978-4-08-883596-9
Act 50. "Onslaught" (猛攻); Act 51. "Clash" (激突); Act 52. "Crushing" (破砕); Act 53. "True Identity" (正体); Act 54. "Villains" (悪党); Act 55. "Villains vs. Villains" (悪党 対 悪党); Act 56. "The Fastest Duo" (最速の二人)
Kenkaku's allies attack the policemen led by Yamagata Aritomo guarding the prison, eventually being replaced by Kenshin's group and the former Ten Swords. The group divides to face Kenkaku. Sanosuke and Anji fight a masked woman who uses the land to counter their moves. Meanwhile, Kamatari and Cho face an armored man and small soldier and Kenshin and Sojiro clash with Itekura.
10	January 5, 2026	978-4-08-884142-7
Act 57. "Itekura's Battle Style" (凍座 その戦型); Act 58. "Itekura in the Snowy Scenery" (凍座 雪景にて); Act 59. "Outmatched" (劣勢, Ressai); Act 60. "Various Fighting Forms" (多彩な戦闘形態, Tasaina Sentō Keitai); Act 61. "Direct Negotiations" (直接交渉, Chokusetsu Kōshō); Act 62. "Time Limit" (時限, Jigen); Act 63. "Autumn Rain" (秋雨, Akisame)
While Kenshin and his allies are battling Kenkaku, Ashitaro joins the fight, wielding Shishio Makoto's sword, Mugenjin. Outnumbered, Itekura receives a peace offer from Kenshin and Commander Kanzato Gatou. Gatou claims that he waited for Kenshin's forces to reach Hokkaido so that they could demonstrate their potential to the Minister of Home Affairs, Aritomo Yamagata, and form an alliance with him. Yamagata claims to have created multiple versions of himself to protect the country alone. Ashitaro challenges Gatou, but when Kenshin intervenes, Ashitaro reaches his body's limit. The former leader of the Oniwabanshu, Shinomori Aoshi, rescues him. Shinomori forms a truce with Yamagata to end the war. As Kenshin falls into a coma, his allies rest, and Ashitaro claims that he will grow stronger for Kenshin's sake.

=== Chapters not yet in tankōbon format ===
These chapters have yet to be published in a tankōbon volume. They were serialized in issues of Jump Square.

== Reception ==
In July 2019, Jump Square announced that Rurouni Kenshin: The Hokkaido Arc had 1.2 million copies in print. The first volume debuted at number four on Oricon's list of the best-selling manga with 172,160 copies sold. By its sixth week, it had sold 322,520 copies. The second volume debuted at number three with 201,590 copies sold, while volume three debuted at number three, selling 111,231 copies. Volumes three and four's initial printings of 350,000 copies were some of the highest first printings that Shueisha made for manga between 2019–2020 and 2020–2021 respectively. Natalie reported that volume four was the fifth best-selling manga at Tsutaya stores during its first week of release. Volume five debuted on the Oricon chart at number six with 108,859 copies sold, while volume six topped the chart in its first week with 75,731 copies sold. Volume seven sold 117,720 copies its first week, but peaked at third place on the Oricon chart. Volume eight debuted in second place with 95,594 copies sold, and volume nine peaked at number four with 81,380 copies sold in its first week. Volume ten also debuted in fourth place, with 75,395 copies sold.

Based on the first volume only, the January 2019 issue of Da Vinci magazine included Rurouni Kenshin: The Hokkaido Arc at number 21 on its annual "Book of the Year" list for 2018. The list was voted on by 4,275 book reviewers, writers, and bookstore employees.

Aniplex producer Masami Niwa expressed interest in a future adaptation of the manga.
