= Rurouni Kenshin: Master of Flame =

Japanese manga series

- Cover of the tankōbon volume, featuring Shishio Makoto

炎を統べる -るろうに剣心・裏幕- (Honō o Suberu Rurōni Kenshin Uramaku)
- Genre: Adventure; Martial arts
- Manga
- Written by: Nobuhiro Watsuki
- Published by: Shueisha
- English publisher: NA: Viz Media
- Imprint: Jump Comics SQ.
- Magazine: Jump Square
- English magazine: NA: Weekly Shonen Jump
- Original run: July 4, 2014 – September 4, 2014
- Volumes: 1
- icon

Rurouni Kenshin: Master of Flame (Japanese: 炎を統べる -るろうに剣心・裏幕-, Hepburn: Honō o Suberu Rurōni Kenshin Uramaku; lit. 'Controlling Flame – Rurouni Kenshin: Hidden Chapter') is a two-chapter Japanese manga written and illustrated by Nobuhiro Watsuki. It is a spin-off of the main series Rurouni Kenshin. It tells the story about how Shishio Makoto met Komagata Yumi and acquired the battleship Rengoku.

The chapters were published in Shueisha's Jump Square in July and September 2014. Shueisha collected the chapters in a single tankōbon volume. In North America, Viz Media published the chapters on its Weekly Shonen Jump digital magazine.

== Plot ==
Shishio Makoto, accompanied by Seta Sōjirō and Sadojima Hōji, goes to Yoshiwara to seek the services of Hanahomura, who is the most sought after courtesan in the district. Hanahomura reveals to Shishio that she came to work in Yoshiwara after her family was murdered by an unknown culprit. They are interrupted by the arrival of the Wadatsumi Shark Corps, a paramilitary unit whose members frequently avail the services of Yoshiwara's brothels. The unit's leader, Sameo Ichigase, seeks to permanently acquire Hanahomura's service and tells her he will return for her in a week. Hanahomura's companions, Hanabi and the children Akari and Kagari, inadvertently stumble onto the Wadatsumi Shark Corps's plans to purchase the battleship Rengoku; Hanabi is murdered while the children are taken to be offered to the Rengoku's dealer. Hanahomura offers her life to Shishio in order to convince him to rescue the children. The Wadatsumi Shark Corps are intercepted by Shishio and his Juppongatana, who proceed to slaughter the former. Hanahomura recognizes Shishio as the man who murdered her family when she recognizes the killer's handiwork as Shishio personally slays Ichigase, however she realizes the futility of revenge. Shishio, Sōjiro, and Hōji meet with Yukishiro Enishi in Ichigase's place to negotiate the purchase of the Rengoku. As Hanahomura prepares to depart with Shishio and the Juppongatana, she reveals her name is Komagata Yumi. Shishio sees Himura Kenshin's phantom and resolves to confront him as part of his coup. The story closes with images from Kenshin and Shishio's battle at Mount Hiei.

== Publication ==
In January 2014, Nobuhiro Watsuki's novelist wife, Kaworu Kurosaki, revealed at her Otakon Vegas panel that Watsuki was preparing a spin-off manga centered on Rurouni Kenshin enemy characters. Kurosaki invited the panel's audience to suggest which characters should get the spotlight, and she would give the suggestions to Watsuki. In April 2014, it was reveled that the spin-off manga would be about Shishio Makoto, and it was later specified that it would be about how Shishio met Komagata Yumi and formed the Juppongatana. The manga was published in two parts in Shueisha's Jump Square; the first was published on July 4, 2014, and the second on September 4 of that same year. Shueisha collected the chapters in a single tankōbon volume, under the Jump Comics SQ. imprint, on October 3, 2014; the volume also includes the story "Sono Kage, Hanaregataku Tsunagitomeru Mono" (その翳、離れがたく繋ぎとめるもの), written by Kaworu Kurosaki. Master of Flame was also collected in Rurouni Kenshin: Another Story, published on November 17, 2023, which also includes Rurouni Kenshin: Restoration and its prologue Act Zero.

In North America, Viz Media published the chapters in English on its Weekly Shonen Jump digital magazine.

| No. | Title | Japanese release date | Japanese ISBN |
|---|---|---|---|
| 1 | Rurouni Kenshin: Master of Flame; Honō wo Suberu -Rurouni Kenshin: Uramaku- (炎を統べる -るろうに剣心・裏幕-) | October 3, 2014 | 978-4-08-880259-6 |
Part 1; Part 2
