= Kojirase Hyakki Dominor =

Japanese manga series

- First tankōbon volume cover

こじらせ百鬼ドマイナー (Kojirase Hyakki Domainā)
- Genre: Comedy; Supernatural
- Manga
- Written by: Kōta Nangō
- Published by: Shueisha
- Imprint: Jump Comics SQ.
- Magazine: Jump Square
- Original run: May 2, 2018 – April 3, 2020
- Volumes: 5

Kojirase Hyakki Dominor (こじらせ百鬼ドマイナー, Kojirase Hyakki Domainā) is a Japanese manga series written and illustrated by Kōta Nangō. It was serialized in Shueisha's shōnen manga magazine Jump Square from May 2018 to April 2020.

== Synopsis ==
High school student Hayato Tokai moves to a remote mountain area in Shikoku due to his parents' circumstances, and then, by mistake, transfers to "Mouryou Branch School Shikoku Campus," a school exclusively for yokai. The students there are all local Shikoku yokai, almost unknown nationwide. Moreover, some of them are "minor" yokai who have developed strange complexes and fetishes due to their lack of fame.

== Publication ==
Written and illustrated by Kōta Nangō, Kojirase Hyakki Dominor was serialized in Shueisha's shōnen manga magazine Jump Square from May 2, 2018, to April 3, 2020. Its chapters were compiled into five tankōbon volumes released from December 4, 2018, to May 13, 2020.

No.	Release date	ISBN
1	December 4, 2018	978-4-08-881674-6
2	February 4, 2019	978-4-08-881734-7
3	July 4, 2019	978-4-08-881894-8
4	December 4, 2019	978-4-08-882152-8
5	May 13, 2020	978-4-08-882288-4

== Reception ==
The series was nominated for the 5th Next Manga Awards in the print category, and was ranked tenth out of 50 nominees.
