= List of World Trigger chapters =

The chapters of the Japanese manga series World Trigger are written and illustrated by Daisuke Ashihara. Individual chapters have been serialized in Weekly Shōnen Jump from February 2013, until November 2016 where it took a two-year hiatus due to the author's health; it then returned for five weeks between November and December 2016, before transferring to Jump Square in December 2018. The chapters are collected into tankōbon volumes published by Shueisha. As of October 2026, thirty volumes have been released in Japan. Viz Media has licensed the series, and currently twenty-seven volumes have been released in English.

== Volumes ==
No.	Title	Original release date	English release date
1	Osamu Mikumo; Mikumo Osamu (三雲 修)	July 4, 2013; 978-4-08-870809-6	October 7, 2014; 978-1-4215-7764-7
1. "Osamu Mikumo" (三雲 修, "Mikumo Osamu"); 2. "Yūma Kuga" (空閑 遊真, "Kuga Yūma"); 3. "Yūma Kuga: Part 2" (空閑 遊真 ➁, "Kuga Yūma 2"); 4. "Osamu Mikumo: Part 2" (三雲 修 ➁, "Mikumo Osamu 2"); 5. "Yūma Kuga: Part 3" (空閑 遊真 ➂, "Kuga Yūma 3"); 6. "Arashiyama Squad" (嵐山隊, "Arashiyama-tai"); 7. "Ai Kitora" (木虎 藍, "Kitora Ai")
2	Yūichi Jin; Jin Yūichi (迅 悠一)	September 4, 2013; 978-4-08-870841-6	October 7, 2014; 978-1-4215-7765-4
8. "Ai Kitora: Part 2" (木虎 藍 ➁, "Kitora Ai 2"); 9. "Ai Kitora: Part 3" (木虎 藍 ➂, "Kitora Ai 3"); 10. "Border's Upper Echelons" (ボーダー上層部, "Bōdā jōsōbu"); 11. "Yūichi Jin" (迅 悠一, "Jin Yūichi"); 12. "Chika Amatori" (雨取 千佳, "Amatori Chika"); 13. "Chika Amatori: Part 2" (雨取 千佳 ➁, "Amatori Chika 2"); 14. "Miwa Squad" (三輪隊, "Miwa-tai"); 15. "Miwa Squad: Part 2" (三輪隊 ➁, "Miwa-tai 2"); 16. "Miwa Squad: Part 3" (三輪隊 ➂, "Miwa-tai 3")
3	Yūma Kuga; Kuga Yūma (空閑 遊真)	December 4, 2013; 978-4-08-870863-8	December 2, 2014; 978-1-4215-7766-1
17. "Yūichi Jin: Part 2" (迅 悠一 ➁, "Jin Yūichi 2"); 18. "Yūgo Kuga" (空閑 有吾, "Kuga Yūgo"); 19. "Tamakoma Branch" (玉狛支部, "Tamakoma-shibu"); 20. "Yūma Kuga: Part 4" (空閑 遊真 ➃, "Kuga Yūma 4"); 21. "Osamu Mikumo: Part 3" (三雲 修 ➂, "Mikumo Osamu 3"); 22. "Tamakoma Branch: Part 2" (玉狛支部 ➁, "Tamakoma-shibu 2"); 23. "Tamakoma Branch: Part 3" (玉狛支部 ➂, "Tamakoma-shibu 3"); 24. "HQ's Top Teams" (本部トップ部隊(チーム), "Honbu Toppu Chīmu"); 25. "Yūichi Jin: Part 3" (迅 悠一 ➂, "Jin Yūichi 3")
4	Yūichi Jin 2 Jin Yūichi 2 (迅 悠一 ➁)	February 4, 2014; 978-4-08-880029-5	February 3, 2015; 978-1-4215-7767-8
26. "Arashiyama Squad: Part 2" (嵐山隊 ➁, "Arashiyama-tai 2"); 27. "Kei Tachikawa" (太刀川 慶, "Tachikawa Kei"); 28. "Yūichi Jin: Part 4" (迅 悠一 ➃, "Jin Yūichi 4"); 29. "Arashiyama Squad: Part 3" (嵐山隊 ➂, "Arashiyama-tai 3"); 30. "Arashiyama Squad: Part 4" (嵐山隊 ➃, "Arashiyama-tai 4"); 31. "Yūichi Jin: Part 5" (迅 悠一 ➄, "Jin Yūichi 5"); 32. "Yūichi Jin: Part 6" (迅 悠一 ➅, "Jin Yūichi 6"); 33. "Yūma Kuga: Part 5" (空閑 遊真 ➄, "Kuga Yūma 5"); 34. "Chika Amatori: Part 3" (雨取 千佳 ➂, "Amatori Chika 3")
5	Osamu Mikumo 2 Mikumo Osamu 2 (三雲 修 ➁)	April 4, 2014; 978-4-08-870769-3	April 7, 2015; 978-1-4215-7768-5
35. "Osamu Mikumo: Part 4" (三雲 修 ➃, "Mikumo Osamu 4"); 36. "Osamu Mikumo: Part 5" (三雲 修 ➄, "Mikumo Osamu 5"); 37. "Osamu Mikumo: Part 6" (三雲 修 ➅, "Mikumo Osamu 6"); 38. "Yūma Kuga: Part 6" (空閑 遊真 ➅, "Kuga Yūma 6"); 39. "Yūma Kuga: Part 7" (空閑 遊真 ➆, "Kuga Yūma 7"); 40. "Yūma Kuga: Part 8" (空閑 遊真 ➇, "Kuga Yūma 8"); 41. "Replica" (レプリカ, "Repurika"); 42. "Replica: Part 2" (レプリカ ➁, "Repurika 2"); 43. "Yūichi Jin: Part 7" (迅 悠一 ➆, "Jin Yūichi 7")
6	Large-Scale Invasion; Daikibo Shinkō (大規模侵攻)	June 4, 2014; 978-4-08-870769-3	July 7, 2015; 978-1-4215-7913-9
44. "Large-Scale Invasion" (大規模侵攻, "Daikibo Shinkō"); 45. "Large-Scale Invasion: Part 2" (大規模侵攻 ➁, "Daikibo Shinkō 2"); 46. "Large-Scale Invasion: Part 3" (大規模侵攻 ➂, "Daikibo Shinkō 3"); 47. "Large-Scale Invasion: Part 4" (大規模侵攻 ➃, "Daikibo Shinkō 4"); 48. "Large-Scale Invasion: Part 5" (大規模侵攻 ➄, "Daikibo Shinkō 5"); 49. "Large-Scale Invasion: Part 6" (大規模侵攻 ➅, "Daikibo Shinkō 6"); 50. "Osamu Mikumo: Part 7" (三雲 修 ➆, "Mikumo Osamu 7"); 51. "Ai Kitora: Part 4" (木虎 藍 ➃, "Kitora Ai 4"); 52. "Chika Amatori: Part 4" (雨取 千佳 ➃, "Amatori Chika 4")
7	Large-Scale Invasion 2 Daikibo Shinkō 2 (大規模侵攻 ②)	September 4, 2014; 978-4-08-880177-3	October 6, 2015; 978-1-4215-8032-6
53. "Tamakoma First" (玉狛第1, "Tamakoma Daiichi"); 54. "Aftokrator" (アフトクラトル, "Afutokuratoru"); 55. "Tamakoma First: Part 2" (玉狛第1 ②, "Tamakoma Daiichi 2"); 56. "Kazama Squad" (風間隊, "Kazama-tai"); 57. "Large-Scale Invasion: Part 7" (大規模侵攻 ➆, "Daikibo Shinkō 7"); 58. "Large-Scale Invasion: Part 8" (大規模侵攻 ➇, "Daikibo Shinkō 8"); 59. "Large-Scale Invasion: Part 9" (大規模侵攻 ⑨, "Daikibo Shinkō 9"); 60. "Large-Scale Invasion: Part 10" (大規模侵攻 ⑩, "Daikibo Shinkō 10"); 61. "Large-Scale Invasion: Part 11" (大規模侵攻 ⑪, "Daikibo Shinkō 11")
8	Large-Scale Invasion 3 Daikibo Shinkō 3 (大規模侵攻 ➂)	October 3, 2014; 978-4-08-880195-7	January 5, 2016; 978-1-4215-8125-5
62. "Aftokrator: Part 2" (アフトクラトル ②, "Afutokuratoru 2"); 63. "Large-Scale Invasion: Part 12" (大規模侵攻 ⑫, "Daikibo Shinkō 12"); 64. "Large-Scale Invasion: Part 13" (大規模侵攻 ⑬, "Daikibo Shinkō 13"); 65. "Large-Scale Invasion: Part 14" (大規模侵攻 ⑭, "Daikibo Shinkō 14"); 66. "Large-Scale Invasion: Part 15" (大規模侵攻 ⑮, "Daikibo Shinkō 15"); 67. "Large-Scale Invasion: Part 16" (大規模侵攻 ⑯, "Daikibo Shinkō 16"); 68. "Aftokrator: Part 3" (アフトクラトル ➂, "Afutokuratoru 3"); 69. "Osamu Mikumo: Part 8" (三雲 修 ➇, "Mikumo Osamu 8"); 70. "Large-Scale Invasion: Part 17" (大規模侵攻 ⑰, "Daikibo Shinkō 17")
9	Large-Scale Invasion 4 Daikibo Shinkō 4 (大規模侵攻④)	January 5, 2015; 978-4-08-880296-1	March 1, 2016; 978-1-4215-8268-9
71. "Large-Scale Invasion: Part 18" (大規模侵攻 ⑱, "Daikibo Shinkō 18"); 72. "Large-Scale Invasion: Part 19" (大規模侵攻 ⑲, "Daikibo Shinkō 19"); 73. "Large-Scale Invasion: Part 20" (大規模侵攻 ⑳, "Daikibo Shinkō 20"); 74. "Kyōsuke Karasuma" (烏丸 京介, "Karasuma Kyōsuke"); 75. "Large-Scale Invasion: Part 21" (大規模侵攻 ㉑, "Daikibo Shinkō 21"); 76. "Shūji Miwa" (三輪 秀次, "Miwa Shūji"); 77. "Large-Scale Invasion: Part 22" (大規模侵攻 ㉒, "Daikibo Shinkō 22"); 78. "Yūma Kuga: Part 9" (空閑 遊真 ⑨, Kuga Yūma 9); 79. "Large-Scale Invasion: Part 23" (大規模侵攻㉓, "Daikibo Shinkō 23")
10	Osamu Mikumo 3 Mikumo Osamu 3 (三雲修 3)	March 4, 2015; 978-4-08-880332-6	May 3, 2016; 978-1-4215-8447-8
80. "Replica: Part 3" (レプリカ③, "Repurika 3"); 81. "Large-Scale Invasion: Part 24" ("大規模侵攻㉔, Daikibo Shinkō 24"); 82. "Osamu Mikumo: Part 9" (三雲 修 ⑨, "Mikumo Osamu 9"); 83. "Yūma Kuga: Part 10" (空閑 遊真⑩, "Kuga Yūma 10"); 84. "Osamu Mikumo: Part 10" (三雲 修⑩, "Mikumo Osamu 10"); 85. "Osamu Mikumo: Part 11" (三雲 修⑪, "Mikumo Osamu 11"); 86. "Tamakoma Second" (玉狛第2, "Tamakoma Dai-ni"); 87. "Tamakoma Second: Part 2" (玉狛第2 ②, "Tamakoma Dai-ni 2"); 88. "Tamakoma Second: Part 3" (玉狛第2 ➂, "Tamakoma Dai-ni 3")
11	Tamakoma Second; Tamakoma Daini (玉狛第2)	June 4, 2015; 978-4-08-880368-5	July 5, 2016; 978-1-4215-8519-2
89. "Tamakoma Second: Part 4" (玉狛第2 ④, "Tamakoma Daini 4"); 90. "Tamakoma Second: Part 5" (玉狛第2 ➄, "Tamakoma Daini 5"); 91. "Tamakoma Second: Part 6" (玉狛第2 ➅, "Tamakoma Daini 6"); 92. "Shiori Usami" (宇佐美 栞, "Usami Shiori"); 93. "Kō Murakami" (村上 鋼, "Murakami Kō"); 94. "Yūma Kuga: Part 11" (空閑遊真 ⑪, "Kuga Yūma 11"); 95. "Suzunari First" (鈴鳴第一, "Suzunari Daiichi"); 96. "Nasu Squad" (那須隊, "Nasu-tai"); 97. "Nasu Squad: Part 2" (那須隊②, "Nasu-tai 2")
12	Tamakoma Second 2 Tamakoma Daini 2 (玉狛第2②)	September 4, 2015; 978-4-08-880463-7	September 6, 2016; 978-1-4215-8708-0
98. "Nasu Squad: Part 3" (那須隊➂, "Nasu-tai 3"); 99. "Nasu Squad: Part 4" (那須隊④, "Nasu-tai 4"); 100. "Kō Murakami: Part 2" (村上鋼, "Murakami Kō 2"); 101. "Yūma Kuga: Part 12" (空閑 遊真 ⑫, "Kuga Yūma 12"); 102. "Rei Nasu" (那須 玲, "Nasu Rei"); 103. "Tamakoma Second: Part 7" (玉駒第二⑦, "Tamakoma Dai 2"); 104. "Tamakoma Branch: Part 7" (玉駒支部⑦, "Tamakoma-shibu 7"); 105. "Aftokrator: Part 4" (アフトクラトル④, "Afutokuratoru 4"); 106. "Masataka Ninomiya" (二宮匡貴, "Ninomiya Masataka")
13	Osamu Mikumo 4 Mikumo Osamu 4 (三雲 修④)	December 4, 2015; 978-4-08-880499-6	November 1, 2016; 978-1-4215-9044-8
107. "Osamu Mikumo: Part 12" (三雲修⑫, "Mikumo Osamu 12"); 108. "Yuzuru Ema" (絵馬 ユズル, "Ema Yuzuru"); 109. "Masato Kageura" (影浦 雅人, "Kageura Masato"); 110. "Haruaki Azuma" (東 春秋, "Azuma Haruaki"); 111. "Yūichi Jin: Part 8" (迅悠一⑧, "Jin Yūichi 8"); 112. "Haruaki Azuma: Part 2" (東 春秋②, "Azuma Haruaki 2"); 113. "Kageura Squad" (影浦隊, "Kageura-tai"); 114. "Masataka Ninomiya: Part 2" (二宮 匡貴②, "Ninomiya Masataka 2"); 115. "Osamu Mikumo: Part 13" (三雲 修⑬, "Mikumo Osamu 13")
14	Yūichi Jin 3 Jin Yūichi 3 (迅 悠一③)	March 4, 2016; 978-4-08-880629-7	January 3, 2017; 978-1-4215-9064-6
116. "Yūichi Jin: Part 9" (迅 悠一⑨, "Jin Yūichi 9"); 117. "Yōtarō Rindō" (林藤 陽太郎, "Rindō Yōtarō"); 118. "Chika Amatori: Part 5" (雨鳥 千佳⑤, "Amatori Chika 5"); 119. "Aftokrator: Part 5" (アフトクラトル⑤, "Afutokratoru 5"); 120. "Aftokrator: Part 6" (アフトクラトル➅, "Afutokratoru 6"); 121. "Galopoula" (ガロプラ, "Garopura"); 122. "Ai Kitora: Part 5" (木虎 蓝⑤, "Kitora Ai 5"); 123. "Galopoula: Part 2" (ガロプラ②, "Garopura 2"); 124. "Galopoula: Part 3" (ガロプラ③, "Garopura 3")
15	Galopoula; Garopura (ガロプラ)	June 3, 2016; 978-4-08-880687-7	April 4, 2017; 978-1-4215-9258-9
125. "Galopoula: Part 4" (ガロプラ④, "Garopura 4"); 126. "Galopoula: Part 5" (ガロプラ⑤, "Garopura 5"); 127. "Galopoula: Part 6" (ガロプラ⑥, "Garopura 6"); 128. "Galopoula: Part 7" (ガロプラ⑦, "Garopura 7"); 129. "Galopoula: Part 8" (ガロプラ⑧, "Garopura 8"); 130. "Galopoula: Part 9" (ガロプラ⑨, "Garopura 9"); 131. "Galopoula: Part 10" (ガロプラ⑩, "Garopura 10"); 132. "Galopoula: Part 11" (ガロプラ⑪, "Garopura 11"); 133. "Galopoula: Part 12" (ガロプラ⑫, "Garopura 12")
16	Tamakoma Second 3 Tamakoma Daini 3 (玉狛第2③)	September 2, 2016; 978-4-08-880777-5	July 4, 2017; 978-1-4215-9332-6
134. "Yōtarō Rindō: Part 2" (林藤 陽太郎 ②, "Rindō Yōtarō 2"); 135. "Hyuse" (ヒュース, "Hyūsu"); 136. "Galopoula: Part 13" (ガロプラ⑬, "Garopura 13"); 137. "Katori Squad" (香取隊, "Katori-tai"); 138. "Tamakoma Second: Part 9" (玉駒第2⑨, "Tamakoma Daini 9"); 139. "Tamakoma Second: Part 10" (玉狛第2⑩, "Tamakoma Daini 10"); 140. "Tamakoma Second: Part 11" (玉狛第2⑪, "Tamakoma Daini 11"); 141. "Tamakoma Second: Part 12" (玉狛第2⑫, "Tamakoma Daini 12"); 142. "Kuniharu Kakizaki" (柿崎 国治, "Kakizaki Kuniharu")
17	Tamakoma Second 4 Tamakoma Daini 4 (玉狛第2④)	December 2, 2016; 978-4-08-880822-2	October 3, 2017; 978-1-4215-9623-5
143. "Osamu Mikumo: Part 14" (三雲修⑭, "Mikumo Osamu 14"); 144. "Yōko Katori" (香取 葉子, "Katori Yōko"); 145. "Tamakoma Second: Part 13" (玉駒第2⑬, "Tamakoma Daini 13"); 146. "Tamakoma Second: Part 14" (玉駒第2⑭, "Tamakoma Daini 14"); 147. "Hyuse: Part 2" (ヒュース②, "Hyūsu 2"); 148. "Osamu Mikumo: Part 15" (三雲 修 ⑮, "Mikumo Osamu 15"); 149. "Chika Amatori: Part 6" (雨取 千佳 ⑥, "Amatori Chika 6"); 150. "Tamakoma Second: Part 15" (玉狛第二⑮, "Tamakoma Daini 15"); 151. "Tamakoma Second: Part 16" (玉狛第二⑯, "Tamakoma Daini 16")
18	Hyuse; Hyūsu (ヒュース)	March 3, 2017; 978-4-08-881021-8	January 2, 2018; 978-1-4215-9756-0
152. "Tamakoma Second: Part 17" (玉狛第二⑰, "Tamakoma Daini 17"); 153. "Tatsuhito Ikoma" (生駒達人, "Ikoma Tatsuhito"); 154. "Tatsuhito Ikoma: Part 2" (生駒達人 ➁, "Ikoma Tatsuhito 2"); 155. "Ōji Squad" (王子隊, "Ōji-tai"); 156. "Kazuaki Ōji" (王子 一彰, "Ōji Kazuaki"); 157. "Tamakoma Second: Part 18" (玉狛第二 ⑱, "Tamakoma Daini 18"); 158. "Tamakoma Second: Part 19" (玉狛第二 ⑲, "Tamakoma Daini 19"); 159. "Hyuse: Part 3" (ヒュース ③, "Hyūsu 3"); 160. "Hyuse: Part 4" (ヒュース ➃, "Hyūsu 4")
19	Tamakoma Branch; Tamakoma-shibu (玉狛支部)	December 4, 2018; 978-4-08-881740-8	October 1, 2019; 978-1-9747-0948-9
161. "Tamakoma Branch: Part 4" (玉狛支部 ➃, "Tamakoma-shibu 4"); 162. "Tamakoma Branch: Part 5" (玉狛支部 ➄, "Tamakoma-shibu 5"); 163. "Yuzuru Ema: Part 2" (絵馬 ユズル ➁, "Ema Yuzuru 2"); 164. "Tamakoma Second: Part 20" (玉狛第二 ⑳, "Tamakoma Daini 20"); 165. "Osamu Mikumo: Part 16" (三雲修⑯, "Mikumo Osamu 16"); 166. "Tamakoma-2: Part 21" (玉狛第二 ㉑, "Tamakoma Daini 21"); 167. "Suzunari-1: Part 2" (鈴鳴第一 ②, "Suzunari Daiichi 2"); 168. "Suzunari-1: Part 3" (鈴鳴第一 ➂, "Suzunari Daiichi 3"); 169. "Tamakoma-2: Part 22" (玉狛第二 ㉒, "Tamakoma Daini 22")
20	Tamakoma Second 5 Tamakoma Daini 5 (玉狛第2⑤)	June 4, 2019; 978-4-08-881853-5	April 7, 2020; 978-1-9747-1259-5
170. "Tamakoma-2: Part 23" (玉狛第二 ㉓, "Tamakoma Daini 23"); 171. "Hyuse: Part 5" (ヒュース ➄, "Hyūsu 5"); 172. "Hyuse: Part 6" (ヒュース ➅, "Hyūsu 6"); 173. "Azuma Squad" (東隊, "Azuma-tai"); 174. "Azuma Squad: Part 2" (東隊 ➁, "Azuma-tai 2"); 175. "Hyuse: Part 7" (ヒュース ⑦, "Hyūsu 7"); 176. "Eizo Netsuki" (根付 栄蔵, "Netsuki Eizō"); 177. "Osamu Mikumo: Part 17" (三雲修⑰, "Mikumo Osamu 17"); 178. "Ninomiya Squad" (二宮隊, "Ninomiya-tai")
21	Yuba Squad; Yuba-tai (弓場 隊)	December 4, 2019; 978-4-08-882150-4	November 3, 2020; 978-1-9747-1769-9
179. "Chika Amatori: Part 7" (雨取 千佳 ⑦, "Amatori Chika 7"); 180. "Kazuma Satomi" (里見 一馬, "Satomi Kazuma"); 181. "Takuma Yuba" (弓場 拓磨, "Yuba Takuma"); 182. "Tamakoma Branch: Part 6" (玉狛支部 ➅, "Tamakoma-shibu 6"); 183. "Tamakoma Branch: Part 7" (玉狛支部 ⑦, "Tamakoma-shibu 7"); 184. "Yuba Squad" (弓場隊, "Yuba-tai"); 185. "Ninomiya Squad: Part 2" (二宮隊 ➁, "Ninomiya-tai 2"); 186. "Hyuse: Part 8" (ヒュース ⑧, "Hyūsu 8"); 187. "Yuba Squad: Part 2" (弓場隊 ②, "Yuba-tai 2")
22	Chika Amatori; Amatori Chika (雨取 千佳)	June 4, 2020; 978-4-08-882319-5	May 4, 2021; 978-1-9747-2093-4
188. "Hyuse: Part 9" (ヒュース ⑨, "Hyūsu 9"); 189. "Chika Amatori: Part 8" (雨取 千佳 ⑧, "Amatori Chika 8"); 190. "Yuba Squad: Part 3" (弓場 隊 ③, "Yuba-tai 3"); 191. "Yuba Squad: Part 4" (弓場 隊 ④, "Yuba-tai 4"); 192. "Masataka Ninomiya: Part 3" (二宮 匡貴 ③, "Ninomiya Masataka 3"); 193. "Masataka Ninomiya: Part 4" (二宮 匡貴 ④, "Ninomiya Masataka 4"); 194. "Osamu Mikumo: Part 18" (三雲 修 ⑱, "Mikumo Osamu 18"); 195. "Chika Amatori: Part 9" (雨取 千佳 ⑨, "Amatori Chika 9"); 196. "Tamakoma Second: Part 24" (玉狛第二 ㉔, "Tamakoma Daini 24")
23	The Away Mission Test; Ensei Senbatsu Shiken (遠征選抜試験)	February 4, 2021; 978-4-08-882497-0	March 1, 2022; 978-1-9747-2647-9
197. "B-Rank MidTier Final Match" (B級中位最終戦, "B-Kyū Chūi Saishū-sen"); 198. "B-Rank MidTier Final Match: Part 2" (B級中位最終戦 ②, "B-Kyū Chūi Saishū-sen 2"); 199. "B-Rank War's End" (B級ランク戦終了, "B-Kyū Ranku-sen Shūryō"); 200. "Ruka Shinoda" (忍田 瑠花, "Shinoda Ruka"); 201. "Yōtarō Rindō: Part 3" (林藤 陽太郎 ③, "Rindō Yōtarō 3"); 202. "Galopoula: Part 14" (ガロプラ ⑭, "Garopura 14"); 203. "The Away Mission Test" (遠征選抜試験 ②, "Ensei Senbatsu Shiken"); 204. "The Away Mission Test: Part 2" (遠征選抜試験 ②, "Ensei Senbatsu Shiken 2"); 205. "The Away Mission Test: Part 3" (遠征選抜試験 ③, "Ensei Senbatsu Shiken 3")
24	The Away Mission Test 2 Ensei Senbatsu Shiken 2 (遠征選抜試験 ②)	December 3, 2021; 978-4-08-882770-4	November 8, 2022; 978-1-9747-3442-9
206. "The Away Mission Test: Part 4" (遠征選抜試験 ④, "Ensei Senbatsu Shiken 4"); 207. "The Away Mission Test: Part 5" (遠征選抜試験 ⑤, "Ensei Senbatsu Shiken 5"); 208. "The Away Mission Test: Part 6" (遠征選抜試験 ⑥, "Ensei Senbatsu Shiken 6"); 209. "The Away Mission Test: Part 7" (遠征選抜試験 ⑦, "Ensei Senbatsu Shiken 7"); 210. "The Away Mission Test: Part 8" (遠征選抜試験 ⑧, "Ensei Senbatsu Shiken 8"); 211. "The Away Mission Test: Part 9" (遠征選抜試験 ⑨, "Ensei Senbatsu Shiken 9"); 212. "The Away Mission Test: Part 10" (遠征選抜試験 ⑩, "Ensei Senbatsu Shiken 10"); 213. "The Away Mission Test: Part 11" (遠征選抜試験 ⑪, "Ensei Senbatsu Shiken 11")
25	The Away Mission Test 3 Ensei Senbatsu Shiken 3 (遠征選抜試験 ③)	September 2, 2022; 978-4-08-883173-2	August 1, 2023; 978-1-9747-3895-3
214. "The Away Mission Test: Part 12" (遠征選抜試験 ⑫, "Ensei Senbatsu Shiken 12"); 215. "The Away Mission Test: Part 13" (遠征選抜試験 ⑬, "Ensei Senbatsu Shiken 13"); 216. "The Away Mission Test: Part 14" (遠征選抜試験 ⑭, "Ensei Senbatsu Shiken 14"); 217. "The Away Mission Test: Part 15" (遠征選抜試験 ⑮, "Ensei Senbatsu Shiken 15"); 218. "The Away Mission Test: Part 16" (遠征選抜試験 ⑯, "Ensei Senbatsu Shiken 16"); 219. "The Away Mission Test: Part 17" (遠征選抜試験 ⑰, "Ensei Senbatsu Shiken 17"); 220. "The Away Mission Test: Part 18" (遠征選抜試験 ⑱, "Ensei Senbatsu Shiken 18"); 221. "The Away Mission Test: Part 19" (遠征選抜試験 ⑲, "Ensei Senbatsu Shiken 19"); 222. "The Away Mission Test: Part 20" (遠征選抜試験 ⑳, "Ensei Senbatsu Shiken 20"); 223. "The Away Mission Test: Part 21" (遠征選抜試験 ㉑, "Ensei Senbatsu Shiken 21")
26	The Away Mission Test 4 Ensei Senbatsu Shiken 4 (遠征選抜試験 ④)	June 2, 2023; 978-4-08-883461-0	July 2, 2024; 978-1-9747-4620-0
224. "The Away Mission Test: Part 22" (遠征選抜試験 ㉒, "Ensei Senbatsu Shiken 22"); 225. "Katori Squad 2" (香取隊 ➁, "Katori-tai 2"); 226. "The Away Mission Test: Part 23" (遠征選抜試験 ㉓, "Ensei Senbatsu Shiken 23"); 227. "The Away Mission Test: Part 24" (遠征選抜試験 ㉔, "Ensei Senbatsu Shiken 24"); 228. "The Away Mission Test: Part 25" (遠征選抜試験 ㉕, "Ensei Senbatsu Shiken 25"); 229. "The Away Mission Test: Part 26" (遠征選抜試験 ㉖, "Ensei Senbatsu Shiken 26"); 230. "The Away Mission Test: Part 27" (遠征選抜試験 ㉗, "Ensei Senbatsu Shiken 27"); 231. "The Away Mission Test: Part 28" (遠征選抜試験 ㉘, "Ensei Senbatsu Shiken 28")
27	The Away Mission Test 5 Ensei Senbatsu Shiken 5 (遠征選抜試験 ⑤)	May 2, 2024; 978-4-08-883852-6	February 4, 2025; 978-1-9747-5274-4
232. "The Away Mission Test: Part 29" (遠征選抜試験 ㉙, "Ensei Senbatsu Shiken 29"); 233. "The Away Mission Test: Part 30" (遠征選抜試験 ㉚, "Ensei Senbatsu Shiken 30"); 234. "The Away Mission Test: Part 31" (遠征選抜試験 ㉛, "Ensei Senbatsu Shiken 31"); 235. "The Away Mission Test: Part 32" (遠征選抜試験 ㉜, "Ensei Senbatsu Shiken 32"); 236. "Mirai Hatohara" (鳩原 未来, "Hatohara Mirai"); 237. "The Away Mission Test: Part 33" (遠征選抜試験 ㉝, "Ensei Senbatsu Shiken 33"); 238. "The Away Mission Test: Part 34" (遠征選抜試験 ㉞, "Ensei Senbatsu Shiken 34")
28	The Away Mission Test 6 Ensei Senbatsu Shiken 6 (遠征選抜試験 ➅)	February 4, 2025; 978-4-08-884367-4	March 3, 2026; 978-1-9747-6157-9
239. "The Away Mission Test: Part 35" (遠征選抜試験 ㉟, "Ensei Senbatsu Shiken 35"); 240. "The Away Mission Test: Part 36" (遠征選抜試験 ㊱, "Ensei Senbatsu Shiken 36"); 241. "The Away Mission Test: Part 37" (遠征選抜試験 ㊲, "Ensei Senbatsu Shiken 37"); 242. "The Away Mission Test: Part 38" (遠征選抜試験 ㊳, "Ensei Senbatsu Shiken 38"); 243. "The Away Mission Test: Part 39" (遠征選抜試験 ㊴, "Ensei Senbatsu Shiken 39"); 244. "The Away Mission Test: Part 40" (遠征選抜試験 ㊵, "Ensei Senbatsu Shiken 40"); 245. "Rokuro Wakamura" (若村 麓郎, "Rokurō Wakamura"); 246. "Rokuro Wakamura: Part 2" (若村 麓郎②, "Rokurō Wakamura 2"); 247. "Rokuro Wakamura: Part 3" (若村 麓郎③, "Rokurō Wakamura 3")
29	The Away Mission Test 7 Ensei Senpatsu Shiken 7 (遠征選抜試験 ➆)	December 4, 2025; 978-4-08-884763-4	—
248. "Rokuro Wakamura: Part 4" (若村 麓郎④, "Rokurō Wakamura 4"); 249. "The Away Mission Test: Part 41" (遠征選抜試験 ㊶, "Ensei Senbatsu Shiken 41"); 250. "The Away Mission Test: Part 42" (遠征選抜試験 ㊷, "Ensei Senbatsu Shiken 42"); 251. "Shiki Sayoko" (志岐小夜子, "Shiki Sayoko"); 252. "The Away Mission Test: Part 43" (遠征選抜試験 ㊸, "Ensei Senbatsu Shiken 43"); 253. "The Away Mission Test: Part 44" (遠征選抜試験 ㊹, "Ensei Senbatsu Shiken 44"); 254. "The Away Mission Test: Part 45" (遠征選抜試験 ㊺, "Ensei Senbatsu Shiken 45"); 255. "The Away Mission Test: Part 46" (遠征選抜試験 ㊻, "Ensei Senbatsu Shiken 46"); 256. "The Away Mission Test: Part 47" (遠征選抜試験 ㊼, "Ensei Senbatsu Shiken 47"); 257. "The Away Mission Test: Part 48" (遠征選抜試験 ㊽, "Ensei Senbatsu Shiken 48")
30	— — (—)	October 2, 2026; 978-4-08-885150-1	—
258. "The Away Mission Test, Phase 2: Part 1" (遠征選抜試験 II ①, "Ensei Senbatsu Shiken II 1"); 259. "The Away Mission Test, Phase 2: Part 2" (遠征選抜試験 II ②, "Ensei Senbatsu Shiken II 2"); 260. "The Away Mission Test, Phase 2: Part 3" (遠征選抜試験 II ③, "Ensei Senbatsu Shiken II 3"); 261. "The Away Mission Test, Phase 2: Part 4" (遠征選抜試験 II ④, "Ensei Senbatsu Shiken II 4"); 262. "The Away Mission Test, Phase 2: Part 5" (遠征選抜試験 II ⑤, "Ensei Senbatsu Shiken II 5"); 263. "The Away Mission Test, Phase 2: Part 6" (遠征選抜試験 II ⑥, "Ensei Senbatsu Shiken II 6")

== Chapters not yet in tankōbon format ==
These chapters have yet to be published in a tankōbon volume. They were originally serialized in Japanese in issues of Jump Square from December 2025 onward.
