= Embalming (manga) =

Japanese manga series

- Embalming: The Another Tale of Frankenstein
- First tankōbon volume cover

エンバーミング –THE ANOTHER TALE OF FRANKENSTEIN– (Enbāmingu Ji Anazā Teiru obu Furankenshutain)
- Genre: Action; Dark fantasy
- Manga

Embalming: Dead Body and Bride
- Written by: Nobuhiro Watsuki
- Published by: Shueisha
- English publisher: NA: Viz Media
- Magazine: Jump the Revolution!
- Published: September 30, 2005
- Manga

Embalming II: Dead Body and Lover
- Written by: Nobuhiro Watsuki
- Published by: Shueisha
- Magazine: Jump the Revolution!
- Published: September 29, 2006
- Manga
- Written by: Nobuhiro Watsuki; Kaoru Kurosaki
- Published by: Shueisha
- Imprint: Jump Comics SQ.
- Magazine: Jump Square
- Original run: November 2, 2007 – April 4, 2015
- Volumes: 10
- icon

Embalming: The Another Tale of Frankenstein (Note: Japanese: エンバーミング –THE ANOTHER TALE OF FRANKENSTEIN–, Hepburn: Enbāmingu Ji Anazā Teiru obu Furankenshutain) is a Japanese manga series written and illustrated by Nobuhiro Watsuki, with occasional writing assistance from his wife Kaoru Kurosaki. It was serialized in Shueisha's monthly shōnen manga magazine Jump Square from November 2007 to April 2015, with its chapters collected in ten tankōbon volumes.

Two one-shot stories were first created: Embalming: Dead Body and Bride, which was originally published in the first issue of Jump the Revolution! in September 2005; and Embalming II: Dead Body and Lover, which was released in the second issue of Jump the Revolution! in September 2006. The series draws largely from the famed novel Frankenstein, but also features references to Sherlock Holmes and the real-life Jack the Ripper.

== Overview ==
Embalming takes place in the last decade of the 19th century in Europe and is based on the idea that Victor Frankenstein actually existed and created an artificial human from bodyparts of dead people with the novel being a fictional account of non-fictional events (see Frankenstein's monster) and that even 150 years after this event, numerous scientists across Europe are using what's left of his notes to try and create their own monsters. These creatures are referred to as Frankensteins. The series follows several main characters who are all involved in the Frankenstein research in different ways. Their stories are told in separate, but interconnected episodes or story arcs.

=== One-shots ===
==== Embalming –Dead Body and Bride– ====
The first one-shot published in 2005 follows John Doe and Little Rose, who are hired by a woman named Marigold to destroy the fifty Frankensteins created by Lord Cadaver. Lord Cadaver takes limbs from living people to create his monsters, he took over Marigold's family's factory, killing all but her and taking her legs, from which she is in bad health. For his fee John Doe takes limbs from beautiful women in order to make his Frankenstein bride, he accepts the job with Marigold's legs as payment. They go to the factory and John destroys all the Frankensteins and even though he does not kill humans, he makes an exception for Lord Cadaver. When they return Marigold dies, after burying her, Rose realizes that her butler was giving info to Lord Cadaver. After explaining that she has orders to follow John Doe and keep him from regaining his memory until she dies, she kills the butler.

During the Dead Body and Lover story arc in the serialization, the last half of this one-shot, beginning with John Doe battling Lord Cadaver's Frankensteins, was re-published and labeled as a "special sideline story". It was also combined into the first volume of the series, suggesting that it is part of the canon. Prior to that it was added to the last volume of Watsuki's previous series Buso Renkin, and Viz Media retained it there for their English translation of the series.

==== Embalming II: Dead Body and Lover ====
The second one-shot published in 2006, follows Ashuhit Richter and Elm L. Renegade. While traveling they come across a woman named Kiefer who is trapped under a carriage and save her. Due to people being attacked on the road to her village, Ashuhit and Elm escort her. When they arrive they learn her village was wiped out by an epidemic, and when the doctor could not save them he turned them into Frankensteins. Kiefer lures travelers to the village and the Frankenstein, which is a large combination of the villagers all connected and controlled by Kiefer's Frankenstein brother, kills them for their bodies. After defeating it and the doctor, we learn that as children Ashuhit and Elm ran into the church when a Frankenstein, John Doe, was being created by Ashuhit's father. When it awoke it killed Elm and took Ashuhit's leg. Ashuhit begged his father to turn Elm into a Frankenstein, he agrees because she was his girlfriend.

During the Dead Body and Lover story arc in the serialization, this story was re-published and labeled as a "special sideline story". It was also combined into the first volume of the series, suggesting that it is part of the canon.

=== Embalming: The Another Tale of Frankenstein ===
==== Dead Body and Revenger ====
The serialization begins in the Scottish Highlands in 188X, with Fury Flatliner and Wraith Allen getting revenge against the Frankenstein that killed their parents five years ago. Wraith is mortally wounded, Fury then attacks it but he and the monster are struck by lightning. He awakens in the home of Dr. Peaberry, who found him and gave him medical attention. When he arrives back at Lord Weiss's mansion, who took them in five years ago, Wraith is there waiting for him, now a Frankenstein himself. They learn from Dr. Peaberry that the largest production of Frankenstein's is in London, and decide to head there, Fury to destroy all of them and Wraith to learn about them. However, before leaving Wraith tells Fury that Lord Weiss is the one who turned him into a Frankenstein and that he adopted Edel as his daughter in hopes of turning her into a Frankenstein of his actual daughter. When Lord Weiss attempts to operate on Edel, Fury and Wraith stop him with the help of Dr. Peaberry. Wraith then kills Edel and it is revealed that Fury was turned into a Frankenstein by Dr. Peaberry. He attacks Wraith, but Wraith escapes with Weiss's notes and promises to meet in London. Dr. Peaberry informs Fury that she turned him into a monster with the specific purpose of having him kill all the others.

==== Dead Body and Lover ====
Ashuhit Richter and Elm L. Renegade from Ingolstadt, are traveling to London on a job. When picking up supplies at a Polar Route run inn, Ashuhit runs into Fury and Dr. Peaberry. We learn that 10 years ago Peaberry was an assistant to his father, but left after she was "marked". The priest that runs the inn tells the stray Frankenstein Cadaverick, who overheard, to kill Peaberry, although he is more interested in Ashuhit. At this time, Elm gets lost and ends up traveling with a young couple, Azalea and Phillip, who are on their way to Gretna Green to elope. She explains to them that Mary Shelley's novel Frankenstein; or, The Modern Prometheus was non-fiction and that she herself is a more advanced Frankenstein than the monster in the novel. She also tells them of Polar Route, a secret society that studies Frankensteins and claim to be the true successors to Victor Frankenstein. They are attacked by Cadaverick, who mistook Phillip for Ashuhit. After a battle with Elm, he is killed by Ashuhit.

==== Dead Bodies in London ====
Ashuhit and Elm go to the Diogenes Club to meet with their client, one of its founders Mike Roft (Mycroft Holmes). They are hired to find the Frankenstein Mary Jane Kelly, who was the fifth victim of Jack the Ripper. She was created in order to inform the investigators of Jack the Ripper, but killed her creator and escaped. Ashuhit has Mike Roft's brother, a famous detective (Sherlock Holmes), quickly find Fury and Peaberry and asks them to watch Elm while he hunts for Mary. Ashuhit, Dr. Peaberry and Frederick Abberline go to the home of a group of Frankenstein, who separated from Polar Route but agreed not to interfere with them, that are led by "the Count".

== Characters ==
From left to right: Elm, Ashuhit, Dr. Peaberry and Fury

Fury Flatliner (ヒューリー フラットライナー)
An eighteen-year-old whose parents were killed by a Frankenstein five years ago, along with Wraith's and Edel's. He was turned into a Frankenstein by Dr. Peaberry, for the purpose of destroying all the others. They travel to London on his quest to destroy all of the Frankensteins.
Dr. Peaberry (Dr.ピーベリー)
A German doctor who came to the Scottish Highlands to study the Frankenstein. She helps save Edel and then travels to London with Fury. 10 years ago she was in Polar Route and an assistant to Ashuhit's father, Doktor Richter, she used the Richter family's secret technology to turn Fury into a Frankenstein. Her quest is to destroy the eight special type Frankensteins created by Doktor Richter. Watsuki stated that the female Western doctor character Elder from Rurouni Kenshin Cinema-ban is a distant relative of Peaberry's.
Ashuhit Richter (アシュヒト リヒター)
A twenty-two-year-old nobleman from Ingolstadt, Germany, son of the number one Frankenstein researcher, and a member of Polar Route who specializes in maintaining Frankensteins. His right leg was torn off by John Doe, it is now a mechanical prosthetic that gives the limb super strength, holds ammo magazines, and has the ability to control electricity. His quest is to find a way to turn Elm fully back into a human.
Elm L. Renegade (エルム L レネゲイド)
A twenty-three-year-old German Frankenstein who travels to London with Ashuhit. Her body is that of a thirteen-year-old since that is the age at which she died. She was killed by John Doe and turned into a Frankenstein by Ashuhit's father since he was his girlfriend, though she does not know this. She has the ability of skin modification including;hardening it for protection, softening it to increase her jump, and uses it to speed up recovery from injuries. She can also turn her hand into a vacuum that sucks others' skin into it.
Wraith Allen (レイス アレン)
An eighteen-year-old whose parents were killed by a Frankenstein five years ago, along with Fury's and Edel's. After being mortally wounded by a Frankenstein, he is turned into one himself. He travels to London to study the Frankensteins.
John Doe (ジョン ドゥ)
The sixth special type Frankenstein created by Doktor Ricter, who has no recollection of his "true purpose" and travels with Rose. He killed Elm as soon as he was created. He has scars/stitched wounds on his left palm and on his chest, out of which comes some sort of blast that he uses to fight.
Little Rose (リトル ロゼ)
A woman who was told by the Polar Route to follow John Doe and make sure he never recovers his memory, she also maintains his body.
Edel Violet Kelly (エーデル ヴァイオレット ケリー)
The real Edel Weiss, daughter of Lord Robert Weiss.
Tiger Lily (タイガーリリィ)
The fifth special type Frankenstein created by Doktor Ricter. She is a sensory-enhanced type.

=== Supporting ===
Edel Weiss (エーデル ワイス)
A fifteen-year-old girl whose parents were killed by a Frankenstein five years ago, along with Fury's and Wraith's. She lost her memory that night and becomes the "daughter" of Lord Weiss. She is nearly identical to his actual daughter, except for her eye color being green instead of black.
Robert Weiss (ロバート ワイス)
A viscount and former professor of medicine. He took in Fury, Wraith and Edel five years ago, hiring the boys as gamekeepers and adopting Edel as his daughter.
Azalea Millet (アザレア ミレー)
A nineteen-year-old former barmaid from Liverpool who originally agrees to marry Philip so she can get his money, but actually falls in love with him.
Philip Wilkinson (フィリップ ウィルキンソン)
A twenty-one-year-old heir to an overseas merchant gentry from Liverpool who fell in love with Azalea.
Cadaverick Spasm (カタヴェリック スパスム)
A stray Frankenstein, with the ability to harden his skin into horns and use his muscles to "shoot" them. As a human he was a criminal who was given the death penalty, his creator died in an electrical accident during his creation. His companion is Harpy (ハーピー), a chimera Frankenstein created from having a human brain and vocal chords implanted in a horned owl.

== Release ==
Nobuhiro Watsuki's one-shot, Embalming: Dead Body and Bride (エンバーミング –DEAD BODY and BRIDE–, Enbāmingu Deddo Bodi ando Buraido), was originally published in the first issue of Shueisha's Jump the Revolution! on September 30, 2005; this story was added to the tenth and final volume of Watsuki's Buso Renkin series, published in 2006, and subsequently translated into English by Viz Media when they released the volume in North America in 2008. The second one-shot, Embalming II: Dead Body and Lover (エンバーミング –DEAD BODY and LOVER–, Enbāmingu Deddo Bodi ando Rabu), was released in the magazine's second issue on September 29, 2006.

Embalming: The Another Tale of Frankenstein began serialization in the premiere issue of Shueisha's monthly magazine Jump Square on November 2, 2007. Watsuki put the series on hiatus in February 2012 to start Rurouni Kenshin: Restoration, and resumed in August 2013; the series was put on hiatus again in April 2014, with plans to resume the series with the start of the final arc. The series finished on April 4, 2015. Shueisha collected its chapters in ten tankōbon volumes, released from September 4, 2008, to May 1, 2015.

=== Volumes ===
No.	Release date	ISBN
1	September 4, 2008	978-4-08-874508-4
2	July 3, 2009	978-4-08-874638-8
3	August 4, 2009	978-4-08-874721-7
4	October 4, 2010	978-4-08-870097-7
5	May 2, 2011	978-4-08-870203-2
6	August 4, 2011	978-4-08-870247-6
7	September 4, 2012	978-4-08-870506-4
8	May 2, 2014	978-4-09-187756-7
9	December 4, 2014	978-4-08-880179-7
10	May 1, 2015	978-4-08-880357-9

== Reception ==
Several volumes of Embalming have been featured on Oricon's weekly chart of the best-selling manga; five straight volumes (3 to 7) have reached the top 20 in a span of four years.
