= Mr. Fullswing =

Japanese manga series

- First tankōbon volume cover, featuring Amakuni Saruno
- Genre: Comedy; Sports
- Manga
- Written by: Shinya Suzuki
- Published by: Shueisha
- Imprint: Jump Comics
- Magazine: Weekly Shōnen Jump
- Original run: May 8, 2001 – May 8, 2006
- Volumes: 24
- icon

Mr. Fullswing (stylized as Mr.FULLSWING), also known as MisuFuru (ミスフル), is a Japanese baseball-themed manga series written and illustrated by Shinya Suzuki. It was serialized in Shueisha's Weekly Shōnen Jump magazine from May 2001 to May 2006, with its chapters collected in 24 tankōbon volumes. The series follows Amakuni Saruno, a loser at attracting girls, perverted and prone to getting into trouble, yet he has great strength of heart and body. He is accompanied by Kengo Sawamatsu, and the pair work together in order to fulfill Saruno's dream: dating Nagi Torii, Junishi baseball team manager. Determined to win Nagi's heart, Saruno enters the Junishi baseball club, despite being a complete amateur at baseball, only to find many obstacles, as well as new friends and rivals awaiting him there.

== Plot ==
Amakuni Saruno is a 15-year-old student of Junishi High School. As a teenage boy, he desperately tries to find a girlfriend. Being fed up with seeing all the girls fall in love with high school athletes, he decides to join a sports-club himself. He starts looking around at the different sports clubs with the guidance of his friend, Kengo Sawamatsu. They go to check out the weight lifting club (of which there is only one member, a large, frighteningly buff guy), only for Saruno to see a girl that he assumes to be the manager of the club and show off for her. After sufficiently hurting himself, he helps the girl, Nagi Torii, carry some weights off somewhere and while talking to her finds out that she is actually a manager for the baseball club, not the weight lifting club. Saruno decides to join the baseball club so he can win the heart of Torii.

In joining the club, Saruno finds himself to be very weak compared to other tryouts, surpassing others only in hitting ball. He barely manages to get into last test phase, 5-innings training. He, with other low-ranked entrees, has to survive 5-innings against team composed of high-ranked entrees. In this game, he met Chounosuke Nezu (pitcher), Mei Inukai (pitcher), Pino Tomaru (second), Aoi Shiba (shortstop), Shinji Tatsuragawa (catcher), that forms core of baseball team. In process, Saruno's team manages to pass the test with Saruno breaking the Muranaka record, hitting the school clock. After the entry test, Saruno again finds himself underpowered against seniors of Junishi baseball club. Regular players of Junishi shows their own strengths, which makes them regular. Two weeks after intense training, the team sets out to Izu, to find more intense training awaits. It is also selection test for regular team players.

== Characters ==
Amakuni Saruno (猿野天国, Saruno Amakuni)
Third baseman. Saruno is a fifteen-year-old freshman in high school. He is loud, obnoxious, perverted and often cracks corny jokes. Saruno tries several sports clubs in his desperation to find a girlfriend and finally settles on baseball in an attempt to win the affections of its manager, Torii Nagi, a polite and sweet girl who used to play softball. Saruno acts before he thinks and constantly exaggerates his baseball abilities despite the fact that he is a complete beginner. But although his bragging is empty, he has an amazingly powerful swing and has the potential to become a great baseball player. He is the only person to have surpassed Juunishi's legendary "Mr. Fullswing" Muranaka by accomplishing the same feat that earned Muranaka his record: hitting the school clock with a baseball from the baseball field.
Nagi Torii (鳥居凪, Torii Nagi)
Baseball team manager. She is a polite, sweet, supportive and quiet girl who used to play softball in junior high. She loves baseball and wants to be around the sport even though she can not play it very well. She is the reason that Saruno decides to join the baseball club.
Kengo Sawamatsu (沢松健吾, Sawamatsu Kengo)
Saruno's best friend and adviser. Their friendship is questionable sometimes, though, as they make fun, yell at and fight each other often. Sawamatsu helps Saruno train for the entrance exam to the baseball club.

== Publication ==
Written and illustrated by Shinya Suzuki, Mr. Fullswing was serialized for five years in Shueisha's shōnen manga magazine Weekly Shōnen Jump from May 8, 2001, to May 8, 2006. (Note: Debuted in the magazine's 23rd issue of 2001 (cover date May 21), released on May 8 of that same year.) Shueisha collected its 227 chapters in 24 tankōbon volumes, released from November 2, 2001, to September 4, 2006. Shueisha republished the series in 15 bunkoban volumes, released from October 18, 2011, to May 18, 2012.
