= Jump Square =

Japanese manga magazine

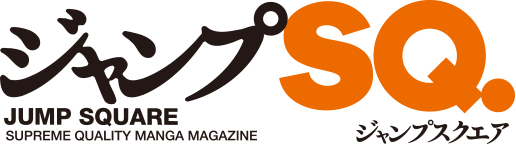

- Jump Square's December 2007 debut issue featuring Embalming, released on November 2, 2007
- Editor: Kôsuke Yahagi
- Categories: Shōnen manga
- Frequency: Monthly
- Circulation: 107,000; (July–September 2026)
- First issue: November 2, 2007; 19 years ago
- Company: Shueisha
- Country: Japan
- Language: Japanese
- Website: jumpsq.shueisha.co.jp

Jump Square (Japanese: ジャンプスクエア, Hepburn: Janpu Sukuea), also written as Jump SQ. (ジャンプSQ.), is a Japanese monthly shōnen manga magazine published by Shueisha. The magazine premiered on November 2, 2007, as a replacement for Monthly Shōnen Jump, another manga anthology that Shueisha discontinued in June of that year. The magazine is a part of the Jump line of magazines. The manga titles serialized in the magazine are also published in tankōbon volumes under the Jump Comics SQ. imprint. Shueisha reported that readers of Jump Square tend to range from 15 to 34 years of age. The current (2015) editor-in-chief is Kôsuke Yahagi.

== History ==
Jump SQ, also called Jump Square, was created as the replacement for Shueisha's canceled Monthly Shōnen Jump manga anthology. The title has three stated meanings: public square ("a plaza where comic lovers and talented artists and writers come together"), algebraic square (Weekly Shōnen Jump²), and "SQ = Supreme Quality" (referring to its "Supreme Quality Manga Magazine" motto). Four manga serials were temporarily moved to Weekly Shōnen Jump, until Jump Square's release. These four series, Tegami Bachi, Rosario + Vampire, Claymore, and Gag Manga Biyori were among the magazine's premiere series, along with debuting series, including Embalming -The Another Tale of Frankenstein-, Kure-nai, and Dragonaut: The Resonance.

== Circulation ==
When Jump Square was launched, the initial printing of 500,000 copies quickly sold out. Over 70% of the copies released across Japan sold within three days. Shueisha printed an additional 100,000 copies to help meet the demand, something normally not necessary with Japanese magazines. The second issue also sold well, requiring a second printing of 60,000 copies. After the first issue excitement died down, circulation leveled off in the vicinity of 370,000 copies and by 2015 had declined to 270,000, mirroring a general drop-off in circulation throughout the industry.

== Features ==
Jump Square's primary content is manga serials. In addition to the manga series, some issues include serialized light novel chapters from works published by the Jump j-Books label. One-shots from established manga writers are featured in a section of the magazine called the "Supreme Yomikiri Series" (SUPREME読切シリーズ, Supurīmu Yomikiri Shirīzu), while pieces from up-and-coming writers occasionally appear in the "Explosive Yomikiri Series" (Explosive読切シリーズ, Explosive Yomikiri Shirīzu) section.

=== Series ===
There are currently 24 manga titles being regularly serialized in Jump Square.

Series title	Author(s)	Premiere issue
Akanabe-sensei wa Tereshirazu (茜部先生は照れ知らず)	Naoya Tajimi	December 2023
Ao no Kai (アオの解)	Masaru Miyokawa, Ryosuke Takeuchi	February 2026
Blue Exorcist (青の祓魔師, Ao no Exorcist)	Kazue Kato	April 2009
Boku no Kanojo wa Kessen Heiki (僕の彼女は決戦兵器)	Tetsuya Tashiro	August 2026
Dark Gathering (ダークギャザリング, Dāku Gyazaringu)	Kenichi Kondō	March 2019
Gintama: 3-Nen Z-Gumi Ginpachi-sensei (銀魂 3年Z組銀八先生)	Yūki Aonuma, Hideaki Sorachi, Tomohito Ohsaki, Ao Suzumemura	January 2026
Gokurakugai (極楽街)	Yuto Sano	August 2022
Higan no Hotaru (彼岸の螢)	Maccha Mochizuki	June 2026
Hōkago no Ōjisama (放課後の王子様)	Takeshi Konomi, Kenichi Sakura	November 2008
Iroha no Mon (いろはの門)	Honami Tsuda	June 2025
Kemono Jihen (怪物事変)	Shō Aimoto	December 2016
Kono Oto Tomare! Sounds of Life (この音とまれ!)	Amyū	August 2012
Masuda Kōsuke Gekijō Gag Manga Biyori GB (増田こうすけ劇場 ギャグマンガ日和GB)	Kōsuke Masuda	December 2014
Maōjō Sideway (魔王城サイドウェイ, Maōjō Saidowei)	Kosei Shimizu, Ukai Itsuki	September 2025
Mashiro-kun no Hokou Atelier (ましろくんの補講アトリエ, Mashiro-kun no Hokō Atorie)	Hyakuhachi Yamamoto	July 2025
Moriarty the Patriot (憂国のモリアーティ, Yūkoku no Moriāti)	Arthur Conan Doyle (Sherlock Holmes series), Ryōsuke Takeuchi, Hikaru Miyoshi	August 2016
Odaroku (オダロク)	Strike Tanaka	April 2026
Phantom Busters (ファントムバスターズ, Fantomu Basutāzu)	Neoshoco	August 2023
Rabbit Chaser (ラビットチェイサー, Rabitto Cheisā)	Yohan	May 2026
Ray by Day (レイバイデイ, Rei Bai Dei)	Kouji Ohno	July 2026
Rurouni Kenshin: The Hokkaido Arc (るろうに剣心 -明治剣客浪漫譚・北海道編-, Rurōni Kenshin: Meiji Kenkaku Roman-tan Hokkaido-hen)	Nobuhiro Watsuki, Kaworu Kurosaki	September 2017
Seraph of the End (終わりのセラフ, Owari no Serafu)	Takaya Kagami, Yamato Yamamoto, Daisuke Furuya	September 2012
Too Cute Crisis (カワイスギクライシス, Kawaisugi Kuraishisu)	Mitsuru Kido	October 2019
World Trigger (ワールドトリガー, Wārudo Torigā)	Daisuke Ashihara	January 2019

== Special issues ==
=== Jump SQ.II ===
Jump SQ.II (ジャンプSQ.II, Janpu Sukuea Sekando) short for Jump Square Second (ジャンプスクエアセカンド), is a spin-off issue of Jump SQ of which three volumes have currently been published, beginning on April 18, 2008.

The first issue featured the collaborative effort between American comic writer Stan Lee and Hiroyuki Takei, called Karakuri Dôji Ultimo (using the Marvel Method).

A contest organized by Shonen Jump (a monthly English version of Weekly Shōnen Jump) and Jump SQ., offered a Jump SQ II issue autographed by Lee and Takei to the random winner at the 2008 New York Comic Con. Three regulars: Sekai no Chūshin de Taiyō ni Hoeru, Tsumikabatsu, and Mahō no Ryōri Chaos Kitchen; were put in the SQ II magazine as their own SQ II exclusive one-shot, along with other one-shot like Missing Battery, Cross, or Alone Again.

The success of Ultimo led to the extra mini book named The Man Who Created "Spider-Man" and the "X-Men" – Stan Lee the book! (｢スパイダーマン｣｢X-MEN｣を作った男 スタン·リー the Book!, Supaidāman, Ekkusume o Tsukutta Otoko Sutan Rī za Bukku!) which is completely based on Lee's American comics, mostly Amazing Fantasy (first Spider-Man, Iron Man, and The Hulk).

=== Jump SQ.19 ===
Jump SQ.19 (ジャンプSQ.19, Janpu Esu Kyū Ichi Kyū) is a spin-off issue of Jump SQ, first published on May 19, 2010. It includes one shots and Jump SQ series' side stories, and a series that only serializes in Jump SQ.19. Initially, it was scheduled to release quarterly on the 19th of every February, May, August, and November.

On February 18, 2012, Jump SQ.19 announced a magazine change to a bimonthly release. It was then published on the 19th of every even-numbered month until its publication ceased on February 19, 2015.

=== Jump SQ.Crown ===
Jump SQ.Crown (ジャンプSQ.CROWN, Janpu Esu Kyū Kuraun) was a spin-off issue of Jump SQ which started publishing on July 17, 2015. It followed a structure similar to Jump SQ.19: the series which only serialized in Jump SQ.Crown; the one-shots by newbies and experienced authors; and the side stories from Jump SQ. series. It ceased publication on January 19, 2018.

=== Jump SQ.Lab ===
Jump SQ.Lab (ジャンプSQ.LaB, Janpu Sukuea Labo) is a spin-off issue of Jump SQ, first published on July 15, 2011. Jump SQ.Lab follows same format as Jump Next; it includes the one shots by both the experienced and the newcomer manga creators, and the side stories for both Jump SQ and Jump SQ.19 series.

=== Jump SQ.Rise ===
Jump SQ.Rise (ジャンプSQ.RISE) is a spin-off issue of Jump SQ which started publishing on April 13, 2018. It follows a structure similar to Jump SQ.19 and Jump SQ Crown.

==== Series ====
There are currently five manga titles being regularly serialized in Jump SQ.Rise.

Series title	Author	Premiered
Beet the Vandel Buster (冒険王ビィト)	Riku Sanjō, Kōji Inada, Katsuyoshi Nakatsuru	April 2018
Blood Blockade Battlefront: Beat 3 Peat (血界戦線 Beat 3 Peat)	Yasuhiro Nightow	October 2022
D.Gray-man (ディー・グレイマン)	Katsura Hoshino	April 2018
Mr. Clice (ミスタークリス)	Osamu Akimoto	April 2018
The Bugle Call: Song of War (戦奏教室, Sensō Kyōshitsu)	Sora Mozuku, Toumori Higoro	July 2026
