= Rurouni Kenshin: The Motion Picture =

Japanese animated film

- Theatrical release poster
- Directed by: Tsuji Hatsuki
- Written by: Yukiyoshi Ohashi
- Based on: Rurouni Kenshin by Nobuhiro Watsuki
- Produced by: Yoshinori Naruke; Akio Wakana
- Starring: Mayo Suzukaze; Miki Fujitani; Yūji Ueda; Miina Tominaga; Hirotaka Suzuoki
- Music by: Taro Iwashiro
- Production company: Studio Gallop
- Distributed by: Sony Pictures Entertainment Japan
- Release date: December 20, 1997
- Running time: 90 minutes

Rurouni Kenshin: The Motion Picture (Japanese: るろうに剣心 -明治剣客浪漫譚- 維新志士への鎮魂歌, Hepburn: Rurouni Kenshin: Ishin Shishi e no Chinkonka; lit. "Rurouni Kenshin: Requiem for the Ishin Patriots"), also known as Rurouni Kenshin: The Movie and Samurai X: The Motion Picture, is a Japanese animated martial arts film directed by Tsuji Hatsuki, produced by Yoshinori Naruke and Akio Wakana and written by Yukiyoshi Ohashi. It is based on the Rurouni Kenshin manga by Nobuhiro Watsuki. Set in the Meiji Era, the plot follows the clashes between the two warriors, Himura Kenshin, a pacifist who wishes to stop a rebellion from Takimi Shigure and a band of desperate rebels who have sworn to settle one final score with society. The movie takes place somewhere after the Kyoto arc. It was released in Japanese theaters on December 20, 1997.

== Plot ==
During the Bakumatsu, two hitokiri warriors from the Ishin Shishi, Himura Kenshin and Gentatsu Takatsuki, face each other which ends with Kenshin's victory. The story then moves to the Meiji period where Kenshin is now a pacifist travelling from Tokyo to Yokohama with his friends Kamiya Kaoru, Sagara Sanosuke and Myojin Yahiko. There, Kenshin befriends the former samurai Takimi Shigure while stopping a group of sailors from attacking the young woman called Toki. The former Shinsengumi captain Saito Hajime, now a policeman, warns Kenshin not to get in touch with Shigure as the government's intels finds him suspicious, as he is linked with criminals and terrorists.

Yahiko befriends one of Shigure's underlings, Yasuharu Musashino, and learns that they are rebels preparing to take down the Meiji government. Yahiko insists on joining them to carry the honor of his late father who died during the war in service to the Shogun. However, Shigure knocks him out and Kenshin, Sanosuke and Kaoru search for him in Tokyo. Sanosuke gathers information in regards of Shigure grabbing Ishin clan survivors from previous wars in order to create an army and is surrounded by military leader Eibin Tamano and Shigure's right hand man Sadajiro Kawaji. After finding Yahiko, Kenshin locates Shigure's forces attacking Tokyo in order to murder the Minister of Law and start a new rebellion in compensation for failing to do it in the Bakumatsu. Kenshin, Saito and Sanosuke enter the area and stop try stopping the terrorist attack. As Kenshin and Shigure exchange blows, the latter realizes that the former was Gentatsu's murderer and becomes enraged as he was his best friend and Toki's brother. However, Shigure escapes from when his forces suffer several casualties including Musashino. As the policemen are ordered to kill the rebels, Kenshin requests Yamagata Aritomo, general of the Japanese Army's ground troops, to give him time to stop Shigure alone and avoid bloodshed. Toki also becomes concerned about Shigure and begs Kenshin to save him.

Kenshin and Sanosuke find that the rebellious group cornered in an area with his wounded soldiers. Kenshin and Shigure have a rematch. As Shigure has remembers Kenshin's moves used against Gentatsu, he takes the upperhand until his enemy creates his own variation of his fighting style. Defeated, Shigure tells Kenshin to kill him, but he claims he will not kill anymore. As Toki appears to request Shigure to give up, he accepts to give in to the police. However, Tamono arrives and orders his troops to gun down everybody in the area. In order to save Toki, Shigure uses his body as a shield, dying in the process. An enraged Kenshin takes down the corrupt official while Yamagata stops the other men. Meanwhile, Saito kills the other traitor. In the aftermath, Kenshin confesses to Toki that he killed his brother in the Bakumatsu but she does not hold hatred towards him for that. Toki returns to Yokohama to carry on the dream of the man she loved.

== Cast ==
| Character | Japanese voice | English voice |
|---|---|---|
| Himura Kenshin | Mayo Suzukaze | J. Shannon Weaver |
| Kamiya Kaoru | Miki Fujitani | Kara Bliss |
| Sagara Sanosuke | Yūji Ueda | Gray G. Haddock |
| Myōjin Yahiko | Miina Tominaga | Derek Wade |
| Saitō Hajime | Hirotaka Suzuoki | Ken Webster |
| Shigure Takimi | Kazuhiko Inoue | Judson L. Jones |
| Takatsuki Toki | Yūko Miyamura | Shaneye Ferrell |
| Takatsuki Gentatsu | Nozomu Sasaki | Boon Sheridan |
| Musashino Yasuharu | Kappei Yamaguchi | Ben Wolfe |
| Sadashirō Kajiki | Takehito Koyasu | Clay Towery |
| Yamagata Aritomo | Holly Kaneko | Bill Harwell |
| Kawaji Toshiyoshi | Katsuya Shiga | David R. Jarrott |
| Eibin Tamono | Jūrōta Kosugi | Bill Wise |
| Tsukioka Katsuhiro | Hiroshi Yanaka | Sam Grimes |

== Production ==
Eizo Sakamoto of Animetal who sings the song for the movie. According to the artist, the ending theme is only possible because of the main story as he found it fitting for the story as well as the style of his previous works.

== Release ==
The film was released in Japan on December 20, 1997. It uses the song "Niji" (虹) by L'Arc-en-Ciel as its opening theme and "Towa no Mirai" (永遠の未来; lit. "Eternal Future") by Animetal as its closing theme. It was released on DVD on May 24, 2000, and on Blu-Ray on October 26, 2011.

ADV Films released the film in DVD format in English regions on under the title of Samurai X: The Motion Picture on March 27, 2001. Following ADV's closure in 2009, Aniplex took the license to re-release the film under the title of Rurouni Kenshin: The Movie on October 26, 2011.

== Reception ==
Critics praised the movie's narrative and animation but often criticized the English dub. THEM Anime Reviews compared the film to Studio Deen's OVAs of Rurouni Kenshin due to the surprisingly dark narrative and violence despite the movie using animation style from the television series which is more lighthearted. The fight sequences, themes involving the rebellion and animation were praised though the English dub was panned for changing several parts of the original Japanese movie. Similarly, MichaelDVD praised the animation while suggesting the plot stands on its own to newcomers or viewers who have only seen the original video animations although Kenshin is portrayed more as a pacifist in contrast to his dark persona from the OVA. In another comparison with the TV series, SciFi noted that the movie was realistic as it discards fantasy elements seen in Watsuki's works and optimistic and humoristic scenes are nearly absent. SciFi believes that fans of the OVA would enjoy The Motion Picture due to its tragic elements and relationship with Kenshin's dark past. The site also noted the story was complex as a result of the drama that plays within most characters whose personalities conveyed appealing swordplay through impressive animation. Although Kenshin is portrayed as a pacifist, the climax features him going into an enraged berserker state which surprised the writer as that was hardly seen in other adaptations of the series. He had mixed feelings about the animation as he viewed it as not up to "theatrical quality, but closer to OVA quality with a few scenes straight from the TV series thrown in." with an average storyline but lamented Saito's smaller role.

Anime News Network found the narrative enjoyable for fans of action and politics though the, like THEM, he found the English dub too different to the point where Shigure's characterization was too different from the Japanese version. Blu-ray.com enjoyed the handling of the politics and the handling of Kenshin's characterization from the OVAs but felt the plot might come across as too convoluted. Nevertheless, the writer praised the character arc of Toki due to how she deals with the tragedy that changes her life in the movie. Due to the high price of the movie, Blu-ray listed the film as "recommended" and suggested fans to wait to find it at a reasonable price before buying it. Mania Beyond Entertainment rated the DVD a B, enjoying the focus on Kenshin and Shigure but lamented how the movie relies heavily on the mortal duel between the former and Gentatsu to the point where this scene is used in several flashbacks. The animation was also praised by the reviewer as the constant flashbacks make a massive contrast with the main story since there is a clear change in regards to the clothes that seem more fitting in the more Westernized Meiji era. About.com was more critical, calling The Motion Picture an extended episode of the TV series which might come across as not entertaining to both newcomers and returning fans.
