= Myōjin Yahiko =

Fictional character from Rurouni Kenshin

- Rurouni Kenshin character
- Myōjin Yahiko on the cover of Rurouni Kenshin Kanzenban Volume 20
- First appearance: Rurouni Kenshin Act 3: Tokyo Samurai
- Created by: Nobuhiro Watsuki
- Portrayed by: Taketo Tanaka (Rurouni Kenshin); Kaito Ōyagi (Kyoto Inferno & The Legend Ends); Riku Ōnish (The Final)
- Voiced by: Japanese; Minami Takayama (drama CD); Miina Tominaga (1996 series); Makoto Koichi (2023 series); English; Brianne Siddall (Samurai X version); Elyse Floyd (1996 series); Derek Wade (OVAs); Blake Shepard (New Kyoto Arc); Alison Viktorin (first three live-action films); Casey Mongillo (The Final); Erica Mendez (2023 series)

In-universe information
- Aliases: Yoshi Myojin (anime, Samurai X version only)

Myōjin Yahiko (明神 弥彦), known as Yahiko Myojin in the Media Blasters English-language dub and Yoshi Mujin in the English Sony Samurai X dub, is a fictional character from the Rurouni Kenshin manga and anime series authored by Nobuhiro Watsuki. The character of Yahiko is based on the author's childhood experiences practicing kendo; since Watsuki's experienced frustration during kendo classes, the author wrote Yahiko as experiencing frustration with his kendo skills. Watsuki liked Yahiko, and while writing the manga, he began to develop the character so that readers would enjoy him.

The fictional setting takes place during the pre-Meiji period of Japan. Yahiko is an orphan from a samurai family who was forced to work as a thief to repay the debt he had presumably owed, as his parents died before they could repay it. When he is rescued by the main character of the story Himura Kenshin, he decides that he will grow up to be just like Kenshin. But because of his strong beliefs, Kenshin will not teach the sword style he had learned. Therefore, Kenshin arranges for Yahiko to be trained by Kamiya Kaoru, the teacher of the Kamiya Kasshin-ryū (神谷活心流; lit. "Gods' Valley Alive Heart Style"). As the series progresses, Yahiko becomes skilled at swordsmanship and faces many opponents.

Yahiko appears in the featured movie of the series, as well as other media relating to the franchise, including a wide range of electronic games and an original video animations (OVAs) series. His character has been very popular with readers from Rurouni Kenshin, ranking near the top of the series' popularity polls. His character is featured in various types of merchandising developed for the series, such as figurines and key-chains. Several publications have commented on his character. While he was initially criticized for his lack of action in the plot, his further development in the series has been praised.

== Creation and conception ==
Redesign for Yahiko as seen in the kanzenban 20 from the series

Nobuhiro Watsuki, creator of Rurouni Kenshin, says that he used no particular logic when drawing Yahiko except for the "defiant" eyes and "mussed" hair. (Watsuki describes these traits as "a must" in a shōnen comic.) Watsuki enjoyed practicing kendo "almost as much as drawing manga". To create Yahiko, Watsuki drew on his emotions from junior high school. He has described himself then as "weak" and "an embarrassment to my 183 centimeters of height" (183 centimeters is equivalent to 6 feet). He says he was a member of the kendo starting squad only because the school suspended another student originally intended to be a starter. However, he failed to win in a league tournament, experienced frustration and felt he was "awful" despite his desire to succeed; he yearned to improve his kendo skills. As an "outlet" for Watsuki's kendo emotions, Yahiko "knows a pain that hero-types like Himura Kenshin and Sagara Sanosuke can never know". As Watsuki further developed the story, Yahiko becomes a comedic character. Watsuki wanted to draw Yahiko in a way that readers could envision him as being a "great" swordsman five to ten years later, eventually giving him a stronger characterization during the Kyoto arc which surprised his readers.

During the last story arc from the manga, the story takes a darker tone than those from other shōnen series published by Shueisha. As the series was aimed at teenagers, Watsuki made Yahiko the main character during the time when Kenshin thought that Kamiya Kaoru was dead; his role was to serve as the identifying character for readers. However, the author found this hard to do, as the more time Kenshin was unwilling to continue to live, the worse Yahiko felt, leaving Watsuki a more negative feeling concerning the story. By the end of the series as Yahiko becomes a teenager, Watsuki had redesigned his appearance. He wanted Yahiko to impress manga readers so that he could be a protagonist for a possible series sequel. He said this goal influenced his design of Yahiko, with Kenshin's physical appearance as well as Sanosuke's personality. He added Sanosuke's kanji of "evil" (惡, aku) to the back of his clothes, and was pleased that various readers recognized it. Although he suggested he was not going to make a sequel, he said the main characters would be Yahiko, Sanjō Tsubame and Tsukayama Yutarō. Watsuki thought about writing a story in which Yahiko and Tsubame would have a son, Myōjin Shinya, who would become a skilled swordsman.

In the 20th volume from the Rurouni Kenshin kanzenban edition, Watsuki again redesigned Yahiko's appearance to show how he would appear at that time. His hair was not as spiky as it was originally, and he had new clothes. He wore a dark jacket, a white short-sleeved T-shirt and short trousers. He did not have socks under his sandals and he had bandages on his hands in order hold a swords. He had two swords—a shinai and a katana—with the latter tied on his back.

In the anime adaptation of Rurouni Kenshin, Watsuki's designs were combined with the voice talents of Miina Tominaga, a voice actress. In producing the English dub version of the series, Media Blasters chose Wendee Lee to voice Yahiko, but she was credited as Elyse Floyd.

== Appearances ==
=== In Rurouni Kenshin ===
Yahiko starts off as arrogant and bad-mannered; he had already bestowed upon himself the title "Tokyo Samurai", as his father was a samurai who died during the Battle of Ueno in the Boshin War, slain at the Kan'ei-ji Temple. Because Yahiko respected his parents, he becomes a thief before the start of the series, to pay back their debt. Yahiko first appears trying to rob Kenshin, who stops him but lets him go. As his yakuza bosses are about to beat him to death for his desire to quit, Kenshin arrives to save him and take him to Kaoru's dojo to learn swordsmanship. Yahiko's dream is to be as strong as Kenshin so he will be able to protect himself and the people he loves. Despite his young age and his short time of training, as the series continues Kenshin allows Yahiko to fight with him, noting that he is too mature for his age. He becomes a witness to many of Kenshin's later battles to the point which Yahiko becomes adept at imitating some of Kenshin's Hiten Mitsurugi-ryū (飛天御剣流; lit. "Flying Heaven Honorable Sword Style") techniques, combining them to perform many other powerful sword techniques. Yahiko also learns the principles of Kamiya Kasshin-ryū (神谷活心流; lit. "Gods' Valley Alive Heart Style"), which matches Kenshin's ideal of saving lives. When Kenshin goes to Kyoto to fight Shishio Makoto who wanted to conquer Japan, Yahiko accompanies Kaoru to find and aid Kenshin. While Kenshin goes to have his final fight against Shishio, he stays in Kyoto to defend their base, a hotel named Aoi-ya, from Shishio's forces along with Kaoru and the Oniwabanshū. They are successful in doing it, and Yahiko manages to defeat one of Shishio's strongest soldiers, Henya.

Yahiko as a teenager capturing an opponent's sword

Back in Tokyo after Shishio's defeat, Yahiko notices Yukishiro Enishi's revenge plot against Kenshin. Sensing his own inability to help, he trains much harder to learn the two succession techniques in Kamiya Kasshin-ryū. Such moves allow him to block an opponent's attack and then hit him with his weapon. He successfully learns both of this techniques and becomes so adept at using them, that Yahiko starts performing several variations. He uses these moves against one of Enishi's partners Otowa Hyōko and defeats him. While Yahiko rests from to his injuries, Kaoru is kidnapped by Enishi, and Yahiko and his friends start searching for her. When another of Enishi's comrades, Kujiranami Hyōgo escapes from jail and goes on a rampage, Yahiko stands up against him. However, he is not strong enough on his own to defeat him and Kenshin saves him at the last moment. After he and Kenshin recover from their fight injuries, they go to rescue Kaoru from Enishi. While on his island fortress, Yahiko defeats one of the four bodyguards from Enishi's partner, Heishin, and witnesses Kenshin's fight against Enishi, which Kenshin wins. Five years later, he is the acting instructor at the Kamiya Kasshin-ryū dojo. One day Kenshin calls him to test his skills; when he lands a hit on Kenshin, he gives Yahiko his own reverse-blade sword as a present for his coming-of-age ceremony.

=== In other media ===
In Rurouni, Meiji Swordsman Romantic Story, he is known as Kamiya Yahiko (神谷 弥彦) and is the brother of Takani Megumi and Kaoru. Yahiko also appears in all of the Rurouni Kenshin video games, including the crossover game Jump Ultimate Stars. After the manga serialization ended, Watsuki authored one-shot chapter from the series in which Yahiko goes to take care from the people of dojo, but ends confronting a former soldier from Shishio who takes as hostages the students from the dojo. In Requiem for the Ishin Patriots, Yahiko joins the samurai Takimi Shigure's group in their attempt to overthrow the Meiji Government, but Shigure later knocks Yahiko out to make him stay out of danger. In Rurouni Kenshin: Reflection, set various years after the manga's end, a now adult Yahiko lives with Sanjō Tsubame, a childhood friend he met who works at a restaurant where both worked together. He starts taking care of Kaoru when she suffers from an illness while Kenshin went to assist people injured in wars. Due to Kaoru's suffering, Yahiko goes to Kyoto to request Kenshin and Kaoru's son, Himura Kenji, to accompany his mother. In order to make him accept, both have a duel, and Yahiko wins.

In the reboot Rurouni Kenshin: Restoration, he works for Takeda Kanryu. As Kanryu plans to kill Kaoru who is fighting for her dojo, Yahiko requests Kenshin's help to save her. After Kanryu's defeat, Yahiko stays in Kaoru's dojo alongside her and Kenshin.

Yahiko was featured in the live action film portrayed by Taketo Tanaka and in the sequels Kyoto Inferno and The Legend Ends portrayed by Kaito Ōyagi. In Saishūshō: The Final he was portrayed by Riku Ohnishi. He appears as the only student in Kaoru's dojo, instead of starting as a thief from the streets in the original series. Also, in the film, he doesn't join Kenshin and Sanosuke in rescuing Megumi from Kanryuu's mansion as he does in the manga.

In the manga sequel Rurouni Kenshin: The Hokkaido Arc, Yahiko confronts Kenshin to make sure he has the same strength he is known for after being told by Kaoru that he became weaker. As Yahiko loses, he returns Kenshin his sakabato to help him in his new journey to find Kaoru's father. Shortly after Kenshin's family leaves, Yahiko remains in charge of the dojo and proposes to Tsubame when she realizes he feels lonely now.

== Reception ==
The character from Yahiko has been well received by manga readers, having consistently placed highly in the Weekly Shōnen Jump popularity polls of the series, usually in the top ten characters and once taking third place. A plethora of merchandise have been released in Yahiko's image, including key-chains wall scrolls, and action figures in both his child and teenager appearances. In an interview with Miina Tominaga, the voice actress for the character, has said that she was a bit afraid when performing the voice of Yahiko in the OVAs since the character was now an adult, but she ended up happy with her performance. Watsuki described Minami Takayama, the CD voice actor, as having "a lot of energy" and as being a "great fit" for Yahiko.

Various publications for manga, anime and other media have provided acclaim and criticism of Yahiko's character. While reviewing the volume 8 from the manga, Mania Entertainment writer Megan Lavey applauded the way Yahiko starts acting much stronger after Kenshin's departure to Kyoto and noted that, along with the other characters starring in the volume, he is seen more in-depth. While reviewing volume 15, Lavey praised Yahiko's development during the series as he becomes a good fighter and his courage shows a remarkable potential to become a powerful swordsman. However, Carlos Ross from T.H.E.M. Anime Reviews criticized Yahiko for being "a bit annoying" during the start of the series but noted that he has his enjoyable moments. Matthew Warner from the Fandom Post stated that the reboot incarnation of Yahiko underwent a major character arc in his battle. In the Critical Survey of Graphic Novels: Manga, multiple writers acknowledged how both Yahiko and Sagara Sanosuke spend their time in the series searching for ways to become stronger. However, they do it for a heroic reason which is assisting Kenshin.

His design in the OVA series has drawn acclaim as one of the few to be well translated from his original manga design by Mike Crandol from Anime News Network. In the second review from the OVA, Crandol liked that Yahiko appeared several times in contrast to the previous OVA in which he was "written out" so that the story would focus more in Kamiya Kaoru and Kenshin's relationship. He also noted his battle against Himura Kenji to be very entertaining, but not as much as the previous fight which was between Kenshin and Yukishiro Enishi. Ridwan Khan from Animefringe noted the fight between Yahiko and Kenji had been long-awaited, it was mostly overshadowed by Kenshin and Kaoru's ending.
