= Yukishiro =

Family name

Yukishiro is a Japanese family name. Fictional people with the name include:

- Yukishiro Enishi, a character in the Japanese manga series Rurouni Kenshin and the main antagonist of the final arc of the series.
- Yukishiro Tomoe, a character in the manga Rurouni Kenshin and older sister of Yukishiro Enishi in the story.
- Honoka Yukishiro, one the main female protagonists in the first series of Pretty Cure, Futari wa Pretty Cure.
- Nanako Yukishiro, the main character from the manga Senryu Girl.
- Reika Yukishiro, a female character and main antagonist of the Japanese survival horror video game, Fatal Frame III: The Tormented.
