= Rurouni Kenshin: The Legend Ends =

2014 Japanese film

- Theatrical release poster

Japanese name
- Kanji: るろうに剣心 伝説の最期編
Transcriptions
- Revised Hepburn: Rurouni Kenshin: Densetsu no Saigo-hen
- Directed by: Keishi Ōtomo
- Screenplay by: Kiyomi Fujii; Keishi Ōtomo
- Based on: Rurouni Kenshin by Nobuhiro Watsuki
- Produced by: Satoshi Fukushima
- Starring: Takeru Satoh; Emi Takei; Yūsuke Iseya; Munetaka Aoki; Yū Aoi; Ryunosuke Kamiki; Masaharu Fukuyama; Yōsuke Eguchi; Tatsuya Fujiwara
- Cinematography: Takuro Ishizaka
- Edited by: Tsuyoshi Imai
- Music by: Naoki Satō
- Production companies: Warner Bros. Pictures Japan; Amuse Inc.; Shueisha; KDDI; GyaO!
- Distributed by: Warner Bros. Pictures
- Release date: September 13, 2014 (Japan)
- Running time: 134 minutes
- Country: Japan
- Language: Japanese
- Budget: $30 million (shared with Kyoto Inferno)
- Box office: $41.9 million

Rurouni Kenshin: The Legend Ends (Japanese: るろうに剣心 伝説の最期編, Hepburn: Rurouni Kenshin: Densetsu no Saigo-hen) is a 2014 Japanese jidaigeki action film directed by Keishi Ōtomo and based on the manga series Rurouni Kenshin. Serving as the third installment of the Rurouni Kenshin film series and a direct sequel to Rurouni Kenshin: Kyoto Inferno (2014), the film takes place immediately after the predecessor and sees Himura Kenshin recover and prepare for a last stand against Shishio Makoto and his gang.

Rurouni Kenshin: The Legend Ends was released in Japan, on September 13, 2014, by Warner Bros. Pictures Japan; one month after Kyoto Inferno. Two further installments in the film series were released in 2021: Rurouni Kenshin: The Final, a sequel to The Legend Ends, and Rurouni Kenshin: The Beginning, a prequel to the entire series.

== Plot ==
In a flashback, Hiko Seijūrō finds young Shinta digging graves for bandits and slavers killed in battle. Hiko decides to take Shinta as his student and names him "Kenshin". Himura Kenshin wakes up at Master Hiko's home, and asks if Kaoru also washed up, but he has been unconscious for three days, and Master Hiko tells him that his friend is most likely dead. Kenshin asks to learn the final Hiten Mitsurugi technique, "Amakakeru Ryū no Hirameki", in order to defeat Shishio Makoto, and Hiko agrees.

Shishio appears off the Tokyo coast in a black iron-clad battleship, demanding that the home minister, Itō Hirobumi, visit him to discuss the situation. The meeting turns violent and Shishio's men kill all the officials except the prime minister. Shishio demands that Battōsai be brought to him, otherwise he will bring down the government by exposing all the killings that were ordered by the current government. Saitō Hajime, who is still searching for Battōsai, is upset that the government is giving into Shishio.

Yahiko Myōjin finds a poster demanding "Battōsai" Kenshin be arrested, which he and Sagara realize suggests that Kenshin must still be alive, and they leave for Tokyo and the Kamiya Dojo with Misao to find him and search for Kaoru Kamiya. A young woman approaches them with a scarf as they are leaving, which Misao recognizes as the one she bandaged Kaoru with and they rush off. They appear outside a hospital and enter to find Kaoru unconscious and alive.

Kenshin learns through his training from Hiko that he had thrown away his will to live during his time as the assassin Battōsai, and as he has no intention of coming out alive he will be unable to defeat Shishio. Hiko also points out that Kenshin has lost his killer instinct with his oath to not kill and his ridiculous sword, after all it is the strong who survive and the weak who die. That night, Hiko says that something is missing in Kenshin, and that he will be given the night to think about it. If he cannot figure out what it is, he will die the next day. The next morning, Kenshin is still unable to understand what is missing in himself. So Hiko reveals his final task as Master to Kenshin - without realising what is missing, Kenshin will return to his old ways - and so Hiko has to kill Battōsai. When Hiko attacks him, Kenshin realises that he is trembling. It is not from fear of his master but from fear of death itself and instinctively uses his sword to protect himself as he does not want to die. Kenshin listens as he is told by his master that he cannot learn the secret until he realises that the will to live is paramount, that his life is just as worthy as others and so he has learned the secret of Amakakeru.

Kaoru awakes from her coma, and reunited with Yahiko and Sanosuke they return to Tokyo. As Kenshin concludes his training and is about to depart, Makimachi Misao arrives with the news that Kaoru is alive. She also tells Kenshin that he has been branded a wanted criminal throughout Japan for his work as Battōsai during the Bakumatsu era. Knowing that Shishio intends to take Tokyo next, Kenshin intends to return home by a secret route given to him by the Oniwabanshū at the Aoiya Inn. They discover that Kashiwazaki Nenji (also known as Okina) has gone on ahead and encountered Shinomori Aoshi, who was lying in wait for Kenshin on that route. Kenshin and Misao arrive and Kenshin duels with Aoshi, during which Okina dies of his wounds. Back at the Aoiya, Misao tends to Aoshi and convinces him to return to the Oniwabanshū. On Shishio's battleship, Shishio, his partner Yumi, and one of his men Hōji, discover that because of Shishio's inability to sweat, he can only fight for fifteen minutes without putting his health at risk.

Kenshin arrives back at the Kamiya Kashin dojo. Takani Megumi, who has been looking after the dojo in Kaoru's absence, welcomes him back, but shortly after his arrival police arrive to apprehend him. Wishing to prevent further violence, he surrenders, and is taken to the Home Ministry head, Itō Hirobumi. Itō explains that he had tried to talk Shishio into abandoning his plan to overthrow the Meiji government, but the negotiations had ended in disaster and Shishio, still bitter about his cruel treatment by the new government (being burned alive), would only leave the government be for the time being if Kenshin were arrested and executed. Otherwise, he intends to attack Tokyo. Kenshin convinces Itō that he can defeat Shishio if Itō helps him. Itō seemingly decides to go through with the execution anyway. Kaoru, Sano and Yahiko return to Tokyo soon after and, to their horror, discover that Kenshin is to be executed the same day. Shishio's men attend the execution to ensure that Itō carries through with the negotiations.

The execution, however, is merely staged, and Kenshin is freed and assisted in defeating the men by Hajime Saitō. Sano joins them, and the three are rowed to Shishio's battleship. While searching for Shishio, Kenshin meets Seta Sōjirō again and the two rematch. Kenshin comes out victorious, and Sōjirō, who originally believed Kenshin to be weak, is crushed and confused. Kenshin finally finds Shishio, Yumi and Hōji waiting in the ship's hold. A duel ensues between Kenshin and Shishio, who easily overpowers Kenshin. Saitō arrives immediately after, followed by Sano and Aoshi, who followed them from Kyoto, but even the four together are no match for Shishio. Shishio hits his limit of 15 minutes and Yumi attempts to shield him from Kenshin while Shishio stabs both of them, killing her. Meanwhile, Ito's men begin firing at the ship, intending to sink it and drown both Shishio and Kenshin inside. Shishio condemns Kenshin for helping such a government. Kenshin agrees that the new Meiji government is faulty, but argues that the age of assassins like himself and Shishio is over and that there should be no more violence. He manages to defeat Shishio using Amakakeru, though not physically harming him. Shishio, who has long hit his limit and whose body has become overheated, catches fire and burns to death before the group's eyes.

Saitō, Aoshi, Sano and Kenshin escape from the ship before it sinks and are brought back to shore, where Kaoru, Yahiko, Misao and the Home Ministry are waiting. Itō acknowledges Kenshin as Himura Kenshin for the first time while declaring Battōsai dead, and his men salute the group as heroes. Aoshi and Misao return to Kyoto, and Kaoru, Kenshin, Yahiko and Sano return to the dojo. Kaoru notes the change of season, as well as the end of Kenshin's life as Battōsai. Kenshin expresses his desire to continue living at the dojo and to move forward into the new era, and invites Kaoru to move forward with him.

== Cast ==
Principal cast list as presented on the Funimation Films website in Western name order:

- Takeru Satoh as Kenshin Himura
- Emi Takei as Kaoru Kamiya
- Munetaka Aoki as Sanosuke Sagara
- Yū Aoi as Megumi Takani
- Kaito Oyagi as Yahiko Myōjin
- Yusuke Iseya as Aoshi Shinomori
- Yōsuke Eguchi as Hajime Saitō
- Tatsuya Fujiwara as Makoto Shishio
- Ryunosuke Kamiki as Sōjirō Seta
- Maryjun Takahashi as Yumi Komagata
- Tao Tsuchiya as Misao Makimachi
- Min Tanaka as Okina
- Masaharu Fukuyama as Seijūrō Hiko
- Yukiyoshi Ozawa as Hirobumi Itō

== Production ==
Ōtomo said the final fight scene was the most difficult scene to shoot, mainly due to how Satoh and Fujiwara did not use stunts. Nevertheless, the director found it as an "epic" scene. The actor said he discussed this scene with the director who pleased with the result. Kenshin's strongest technique, the Amakakeru Ryū no Hirameki, was Satoh's favorite move as he likes its meaning. While Kenshin shouts his attacks' names in both manga and anime, Satoh instead decided to say the names after performing those moves.

=== Music ===
One Ok Rock's song "Heartache" from their album 35xxxv is featured in the film.

== Release ==
Rurouni Kenshin: The Legend Ends was released in Japan theatrically by Warner Bros. Pictures Japan on September 13, 2014. The Blu-ray and DVD was released on January 21, 2015, in Japan.

In June 2016, Funimation Films announced that they acquired the rights to the Rurouni Kenshin live-action trilogy for American distribution, and released subtitled in American theaters in September 2016. The film was released on Blu-ray and DVD by Funimation on January 3, 2017, in North America which includes an English dubbed version of the film, with a TV-MA rating.

== Reception ==
=== Box office ===
The film debuted at the Japanese box office in second place, earning ¥919,479,200. In its fourth weekend, it ranked first and earned ¥177,419,216. It was number-one for four weeks. It was one of the top five films of 2014 at the Japanese box office (below Kyoto Inferno at number three), grossing ¥4.35 billion ($41.06 million) in Japan. Overseas, it grossed ₩16,916,100 ($14,955) in South Korea, and $2,484,963 in other territories, for an international total of $44 million.

=== Critical reception ===
Lito B. Zulueta of Philippine Daily Inquirer praised the film, declaring that "The Legend Ends has "restored the samurai genre", adding "Legend ends in a duel to the death of the two swordsmen. Needless to say, the fight is a spectacle to end all fight spectacles. Directed by Keishi Ohtomo, the Rurouni Kenshin movies are fabulous spectacles that deny itself the usual Hollywood gloss and over-the-top CDG tricks to achieve its epic look and proportion. It instead relies on good old classic filmmaking." Derek Elley of Film Business Asia awarded the film an 8 out of 10, praising its "reflective lead-up to a humdinger finale." and commended that "the mammoth duel on the villain's iron battleship, staged by action director Kenji Tanigaki in a way that shows a return to his Hong Kong training visible in the first movie in the series." Despite praising the dynamic between Kenshin and Shishio's rivalry and its eventual final showdown, Anime News Network criticized the large amount of subplots and multiple characters the film shows which make the third film the weakest installment of the franchise to date.

In a mixed review, Clarence Tsui of The Hollywood Reporter criticized the film's two hour length, as well as its expository first act, and choreography, labeling it "riveting" but the climax of the four against Shishio "po-faced absurdity", although later states "The Legend Ends offers a type of wide-screen, cinematic entertainment that most Japanese film adaptations — of TV series or comics — now lack." The Times considered The Legend Ends inferior to the previous two films due to the multiple fights Kenshin is involved to end the narrative. The Guardian considered the film to suffer "shrieking, still-superfluous supporting characters" and appealing fights that are "modern movie business's absurd gigantism".

== Accolades ==
Award nominations for Rurouni Kenshin: The Legend End
Year	Award	Category	Recipient	Result
2015	Asian Film Awards	Best Actor	Takeru Satoh	Nominated

== Sequels ==
Plans for another sequel had been revealed by Daily.co.jp on September 4, 2017, in connection the main actress Emi Takei's breach of contract due to her marriage with Exile band member Takahiro, as well as her pregnancy. Takei had agreements with up to 10 companies for commercials, including JTB and Yōfuku no Aoyama, and it was reported that her agreement with SSP might be terminated, with her commercial agreements with other companies being affected. Oscar Promotion, Takei's agency, apologized to its clients, and was negotiating penalties for breach of contract. The penalty for her breach of contract could have reached up to 1 billion yen (about US$9.11 million). On April 12, 2019, it was announced that two new live-action films will premiere in summer 2020; Rurouni Kenshin: The Final was slated to premiere on July 3 and Rurouni Kenshin: The Beginning on August 7. Both films were delayed to 2021 due to COVID-19.
