= Himura Kenshin =

Protagonist of the Rurouni Kenshin manga

- Rurouni Kenshin character
- Himura Kenshin's incarnations on the cover of Rurouni Kenshin Kazenban Guidebook, featuring common one in the center, the hitokiri in the top left, the child in the bottom left and the family man in the right
- First appearance: Rurouni Kenshin Act 1: Kenshin ● Himura Battōsai
- Created by: Nobuhiro Watsuki
- Portrayed by: Takeru Satoh
- Voiced by: Japanese; Megumi Ogata (drama CD); Mayo Suzukaze (1996–2019); Soma Saito (2023 series); English; Richard Cansino (1996 series); J. Shanon Weaver (OVAs, New Kyoto Arc); Micah Solusod (live-action films); Howard Wang (2023 series)

In-universe information
- Aliases: Hitokiri Battōsai, Shinta (birth name)
- Spouses: Yukishiro Tomoe (late wife); Kamiya Kaoru (wife)
- Children: Himura Kenji (son)
- Relatives: Yukishiro Enishi (ex-brother-in-law)
- Affiliations: Ishin Shishi (formerly)

Himura Kenshin (緋村 剣心) is a fictional character and the titular protagonist of the manga Rurouni Kenshin created by Nobuhiro Watsuki. Kenshin's story is set in a fictional version of Japan during the Meiji period. Kenshin is a former legendary assassin known as "Hitokiri Battōsai" (人斬り抜刀斎), (Note: Rendered as Battousai the Manslayer in the Media Blasters English anime dub, as Battousai: The Slasher in the Sony English dub, and as The Unsheather on the Japanese kanzenban covers. The term "hitokiri" refers to an assassin and translates as "manslayer". Within the Rurouni Kenshin universe "Battōsai" refers to someone who has mastered battōjutsu. Assassins during the Bakumatsu adopted professional names; for instance Kawakami Gensai was known as Hitokiri Gensai.) more properly named Himura Battōsai (緋村抜刀斎). At the end of the Bakumatsu, he becomes a wandering swordsman, now wielding a sakabatō (逆刃刀; literally "reverse-blade sword")—a katana that has the cutting edge on the inwardly curved side of the sword, thus being nearly incapable of killing. Kenshin wanders the Japanese countryside offering protection and aid to those in need as atonement for the murders he once committed as an assassin. In Tokyo, he meets a young woman named Kamiya Kaoru, who invites him to live in her dojo, despite learning about Kenshin's past. Throughout the series, Kenshin begins to establish lifelong relationships with many people, including ex-enemies, while dealing with his fair share of enemies, new and old.

When creating Kenshin, Watsuki designed the androgynous and small Kenshin to be physical opposite of the bulky Hiko Seijūrō, a character that appears in his first one-shot manga, "Crescent Moon in the Warring States". As a result, he was given a virile appearance with long red hair as well as cross-shaped scar in his face. He was also based on the hitokiri Kawakami Gensai. In Japanese, Kenshin has been voiced by Megumi Ogata for the drama CDs and Mayo Suzukaze for the animated adaptations. In the live-action films he was portrayed by Takeru Satoh. For the English dubs of the series, Richard Cansino voiced him in the first anime, J. Shanon Weaver replaced him for original video animation (OVA), and the duology film New Kyoto Arc. Micah Solusod did the dub for the live-action film trilogy.

Kenshin's character was well received by fans, with his holding the top spot in all reader popularity polls for the series. Critics of the series praised his strong personality and backstory which most critics found appealing. However, though some complained about his development during the OVA series; while his role in the prequel OVAs were praised, his role in the anime-only sequel OVA series resulted in criticism by various critics including Watsuki himself. Satoh's acting in the live-action film received positive comments due to how he fits the character as well as his fight choreography. A variety of collectibles based on Kenshin have been created, including figurines, key chains, plushies, and replicas of his sakabatō sword.

== Creation and conception ==
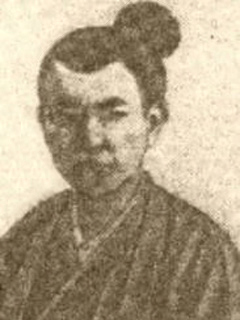
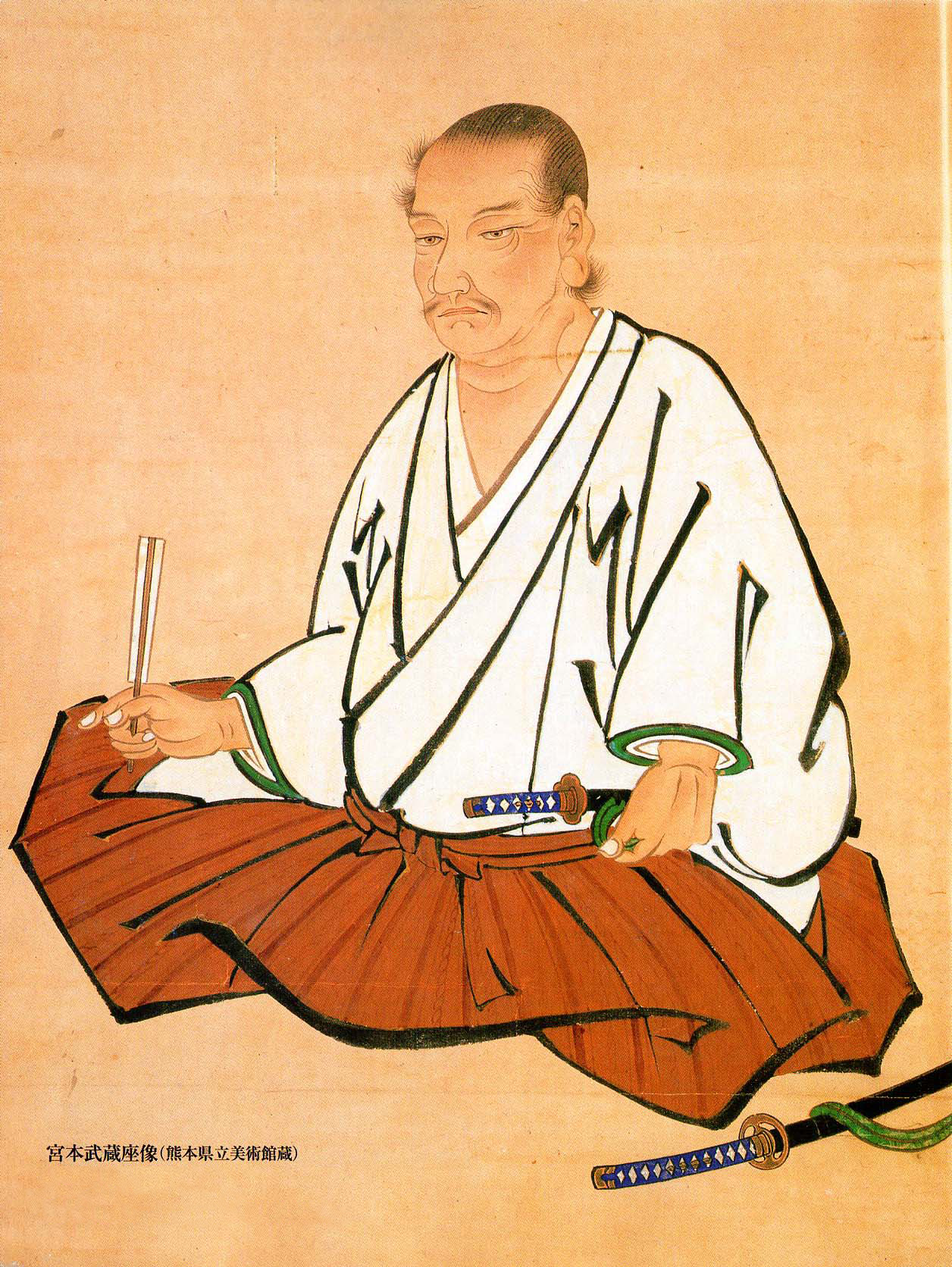
Both Kawakami Gensai (left) and Miyamoto Musashi were influences to Kenshin.

Manga author Nobuhiro Watsuki discovered and used the story of Kawakami Gensai, a hitokiri (人斬り; literally "manslayer") executed by the Meiji Government. Watsuki enjoys drawing Kenshin due to how he tends to sacrifice himself for others. While writing the series, once he thought Kenshin should think more about his future since he is more connected to his past. He also stated he would like to be as Kenshin but he does not believe their lives' style match. Kenshin's morals in regards to having the strength to protect others were influenced by Miyamoto Musashi's questions about the meaning of strength.

Ever since writing his first storyboards for the manga, Watsuki did sketches of Kenshin's appearance and noticed that he looked like Kurama from Yoshihiro Togashi's manga YuYu Hakusho. Watsuki considered himself younger back and that he preferred always drawing goodlooking men in contrast to Hiko Seijuro from a previous one-shot. When competing with these series, Watsuki felt Rurouni Kenshin competed more with YuYu Hakusho that focused more on drama rather than action like Dragon Ball. In contrast to the YuYu Hakusho young lead Yusuke Urameshi, Kenshin was written as an adult with a dark past based on the Edo period in order to make the series stand out. Nevertheless, the manga managed to compete well against other Weekly Shonen Jump manga from the 1990s including Slam Dunk, Dragon Ball and YuYu Hakusho. Kenshin's age was also a departure from common archetypes in manga as the themes and lore in the story made him an adult in contrast to other young protagonist besides City Hunter. Nevertheless, he was careful with how writing these characters as they get old.

During the development of the series' pilot chapter, Rurouni, Meiji Swordsman Romantic Story, Watsuki and his editor argued over Kenshin's speech patterns, settling for a "slangy" one. For the final version of the first Romantic Story, Watsuki adjusted the dialogue; in his view, he made Kenshin sound "more as I prefer him now". Nevertheless, Kenshin was concerned about how Kenshin's manner abruptly changed when facing his opponent. Watsuki added Kenshin's trademark "oro" (おろ) as a placeholder to be an expression of the English speech disfluency "huh". Watsuki notes that he was surprised at how well it caught on, and how much he ended up having Kenshin use the sound during the series. Watsuki also planned to make Kenshin older than 30 years old; his editor commented that it was strange that the main character of a manga for teenagers to be of such an age, so he instead made him 28 years old.

Watsuki based most of Kenshin's abilities on a real swordsman of the Tokugawa period named Matsubayashi Henyasai, who was skilled in acrobatic techniques. However, one of Kenshin's moves where he stops an enemy's flamethrower by rotating his sword received multiple complaints with Watsuki admitting the move as somewhat out of place and "not really organic" to his world. By early publication of Rurouni Kenshin, Watsuki was unsure whether or not Kenshin and Kamiya Kaoru would become lovers in future chapters. Sagara Sanosuke was created to be Kenshin's best friend who would punch him order to make him retain his composure. However, Watsuki did not think the idea worked as much as possibly. For the final fight between Kenshin and Shishio, Watsuki admitted he expressed more joy in drawing Shishio than Kenshin. During this arc and mostly the final fight between Kenshin and Shishio's fight Watsuki kept listening to the song "In The Blue Sky" from the video game Virtual On; the song's title was used in the final chapter of the Kyoto arc. Additionally, the final shot of Kenshin returning to Kaoru's dojo was inspired by the final shot of the Rurouni Kenshin anime's first opening theme:"Sobakasu" by Judy and Mary.

In the next and final arc of the manga, the story took a darker tone as most of the characters believed Kaoru was killed by Yukishiro Enishi which made Kenshin question his own way of living and escape to a village of wanderers. Watsuki did not enjoy angst in Kenshin so his friend Myōjin Yahiko took the place as the series' protagonist until Kenshin recovered. A similar dark event occurs in Kenshin's memories involving how he accidentally killed Tomoe which the author is ashamed of for making him similar to Shishio's murder of Komagata Yumi. In order to make Kenshin recover, Watsuki introduced Tomoe's father, who is simply referred as "Geezer", who assists him in finding an answer to atone for his sins. Once Kenshin recovered, he runs back to the city in order to save Yahiko from Enishi's former comrade, Kujiranami Hyōgo. The fight was originally planned to last longer than the one-chapter shot but due to difficulties in drawing explosions Kujinarami made with his weapons, the fight ended with Kenshin cutting Kujinarami's weapon. In this arc's climax, Watsuki kept listening to the song "Hurry Go Round" by late musician hide which felt it suited the relationship between Enishi as well as Kenshin but in his darker persona. The author also commented he would like to have given both Kenshin and Enishi's characters a bigger contrast. A reader also asked Watsuki whether Kenshin could defeat his rival Saitō Hajime since they never got a final duel. Watsuki responded, saying the two are equally matched but the result might depend whether or not Kenshin had something to protect.

=== Design ===
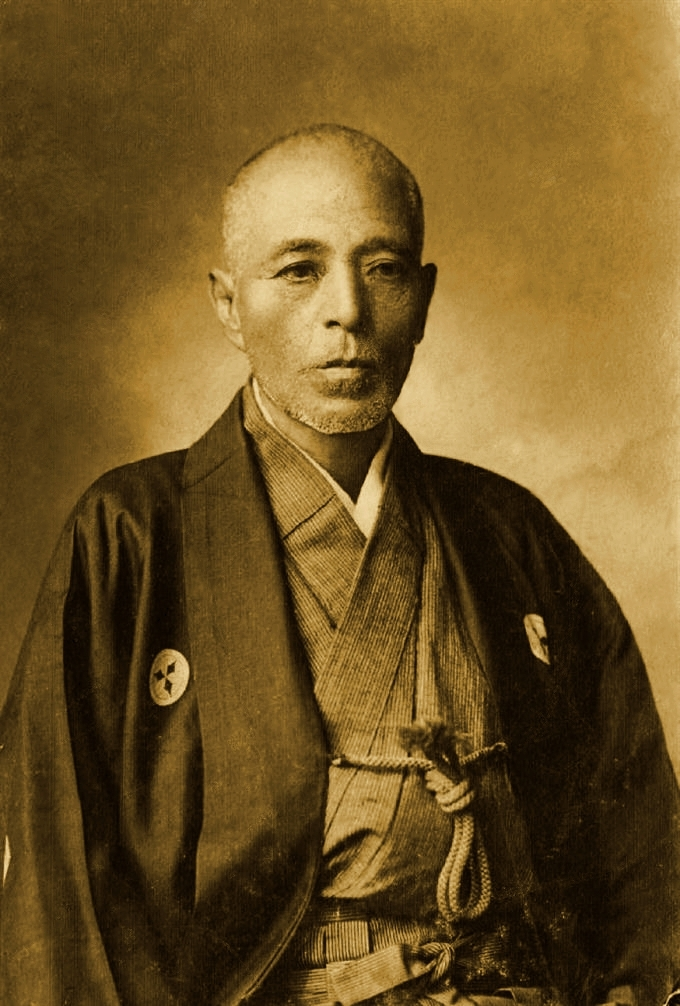
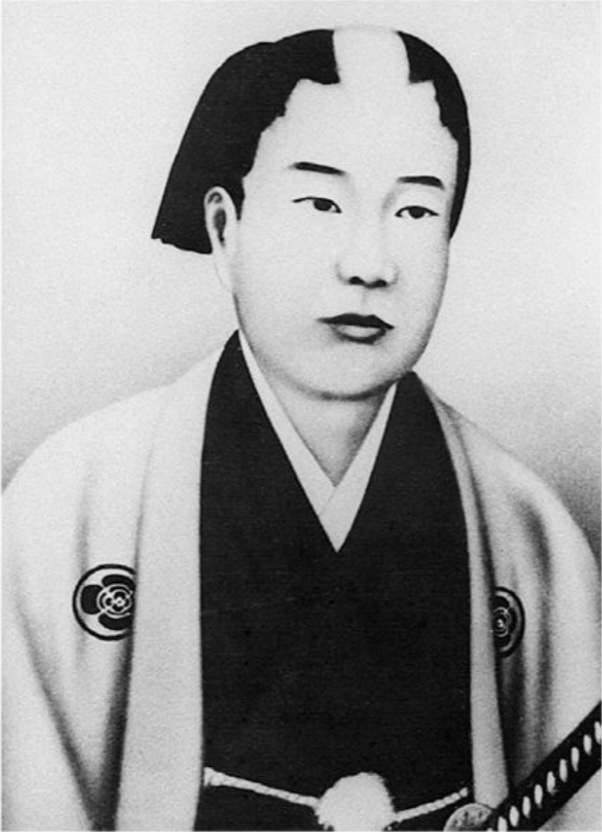
Both Saitō Hajime (left) and Okita Sōji were influences to Kenshin.

Like several characters, Kenshin was influenced the Shinsengumi with Kenshin being affected by Okita Sōji and Saitō Hajime in order to give him an air of mystery. According to Watsuki, when he found that Kawakami maintained a duty to his dead comrades, he decided to create the title character. Since Watsuki's debut work contained a tall, black-haired man in "showy" armor, he wanted to make a character "completely opposite" to the debut character; the new character ended up "coming out like a girl". According to Watsuki, he used "no real motif" when creating Kenshin and placed a cross-shaped scar on his face "not knowing what else to do." During his fight against Shishio Makoto's army, Kenshin is given a new sword with a sheath made of wood. Though it is more difficult to draw, Watsuki decided to redesign the sword to make it look like the first one Kenshin had in the series.

At the end of the series, Kenshin appears with short hair. Initially, Watsuki had planned to make his hair shorter before the end; however, he found this to be similar to the character Multi in To Heart. Additionally, Himura Kenji was introduced in the finale as the son of Kenshin and Kaoru; even though the character was "cliché" Watsuki felt that Kenji had to appear.

In the first Rurouni Kenshin kanzenban, published in Japan in July 2006, Watsuki included a draft page featuring a redesign of Kenshin's character. To make his X-shaped scar more notable, Watsuki made it long enough to cross his nose. Kenshin's hair is tied in two tails, which are flowing to make him look younger, and shorter, and less androgynous. Watsuki also added a Habaki to Kenshin's sword to make it easier to draw by simplifying its structure, while also emphasizing strength. Kenshin's hitokiri look was also redesigned slightly, by making his clothes more worn and giving him Yukishiro Tomoe's neck scarf.

=== Portrayal in other works ===
When the live-action of the manga was made, Watsuki had several ideas about Kenshin's mind about his early appearances in the series. This resulted in the manga reboot Rurouni Kenshin: Restoration where Kenshin's characterization was expanded by the author who thought in retrospective about what he could add to him. He also wrote a prequel chapter to the original series which helped the readers to understand why Kenshin would stay in Kaoru's dojo. He challenged himself to express Kenshin's inner feelings. Watsuki compared Kenshin's role in the original manga to that of Kōmon in Mito Kōmon or Yoshimune's in Abarenbō Shōgun, where the supporting characters built the drama and he was the hero who would defeat the villains. This made it easy to express the thoughts of the surrounding characters but not Kenshin's, so he wanted to "dig deeper" into Kenshin this time. It turned out harder than he imagined. Although drawing it was not difficult, when he tried to make it entertaining the story got gloomier due to Kenshin's regrets. By chapter four he got worried it would be a repeat of the Jinchū Arc of the original manga. This is when he gave up digging deeper into Kenshin's thoughts.

Watsuki tried expressing more of Kenshin's inner feelings in Restoration; a man who brought about a peaceful new era can not find his place because of the acts he committed in the past. He tried expressing this with the "pool of blood" theme. The author said this version of the character seems slightly more immature than the original because he is more reserved and excitable; "perhaps he isn't too hero-like." Watsuki changed the way Hiten Mitsurugi-ryū and its techniques are written purely for fun. The editorial office even got a phone call pointing this out. The most noticeable change in his appearance is the addition of a white scarf, "scarf = hero." Watsuki also changed his cross-shaped scar; leaving it white for Kenshin, but shading it black when his Battōsai persona takes over. The author said because of the way he draws now, he struggled with Kenshin's hair, unable to get the original bushy feeling it had until the end. Alongside Restoration, Watsuki decided to write a prequel to the original series set before Kenshin's first meeting with Kaoru. Watsuki elaborated on the common question of "Why would Kenshin, who wandered for ten years, suddenly stop in the First Act?" In Act Zero an elder notices Kenshin's unhealed emotional scar and her kind advice has a slight effect on him, becoming the motivation for his actions in the first chapter.

The fact that the original manga ended with Kenshin as a family man bothered Watsuki as he was not sure if Kenshin should fight again now that he happily married. Upon watching the Rurouni Kenshin musical, Watsuki was convinced to write Hokkaido as soon as he finished writing his recent work Embalming. In order to keep the cheerful feeling of the original series, Watsuki wrote the new characters who are nicely treated by Kenshin and Kaoru. Upon helping the staff from the live-action films, The Final and The Beginning, Watsuki came up with new ideas to give Kenshin's story a happy ending despite his hitokiri actions. Watsuki believes that Takeru Satoh's portrayal of the main character stands out as stronger than the manga one, most notably in The Final. He felt that Kenshin was a "King Type" character similar to Monkey D. Luffy from Eiichiro Oda's One Piece as a result of how heroic they are. Watsuki also reflected on Kenshin's pacifism which became a common trend in other heroes in Weekly Shonen Jump protagonists like Luffy and Naruto Uzumaki who fight but are against the idea of killing their enemies while in the case of Dragon Ball dead characters are often revived. He believes newer series like Attack on Titan, Demon Slayer: Kimetsu no Yaiba and Jujutsu Kaisen explored more the concept of death. Nevertheless, the Kenshin Watsuki was still written for the Hokkaido Arc with the idea of sparing his enemies.

=== Actors ===
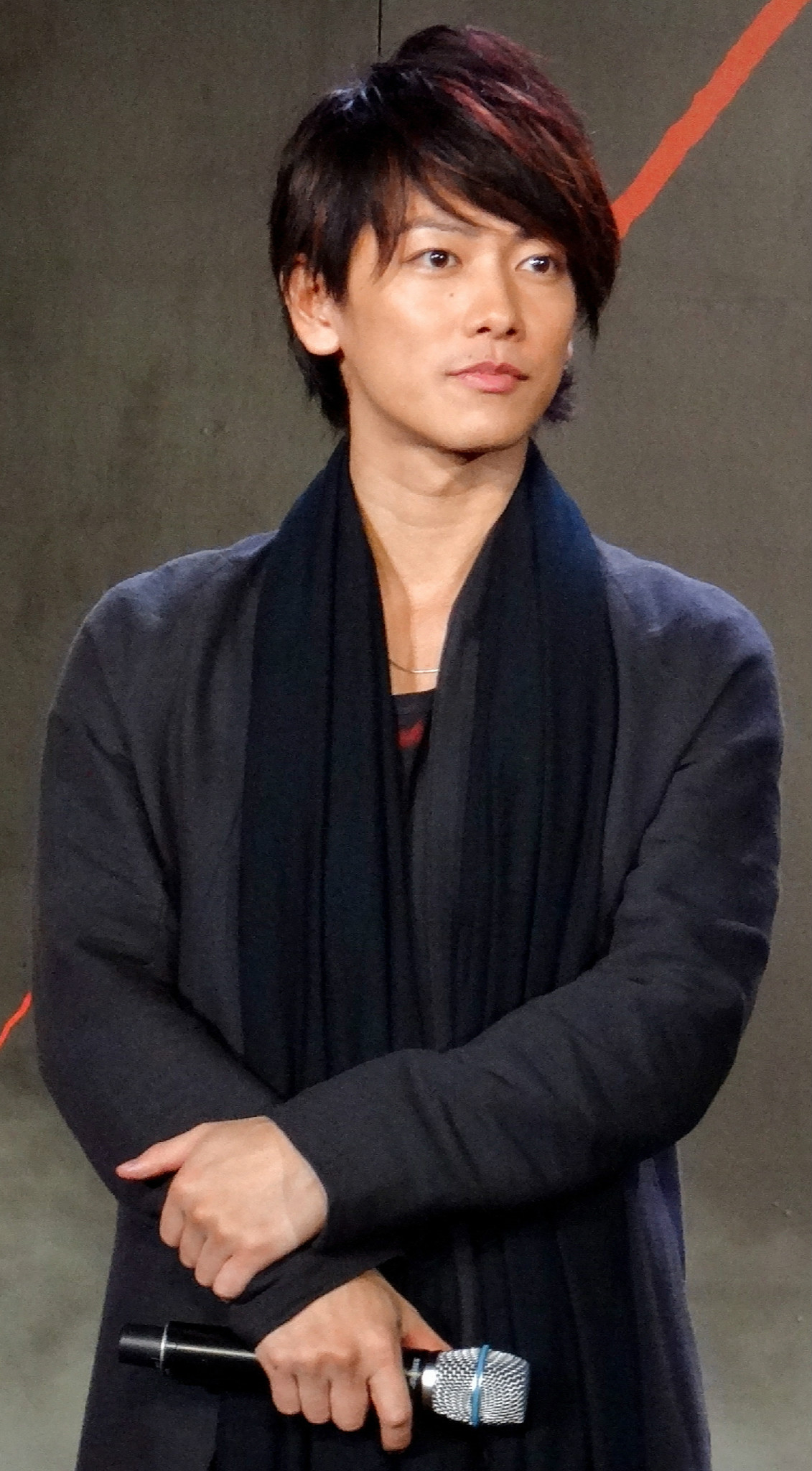
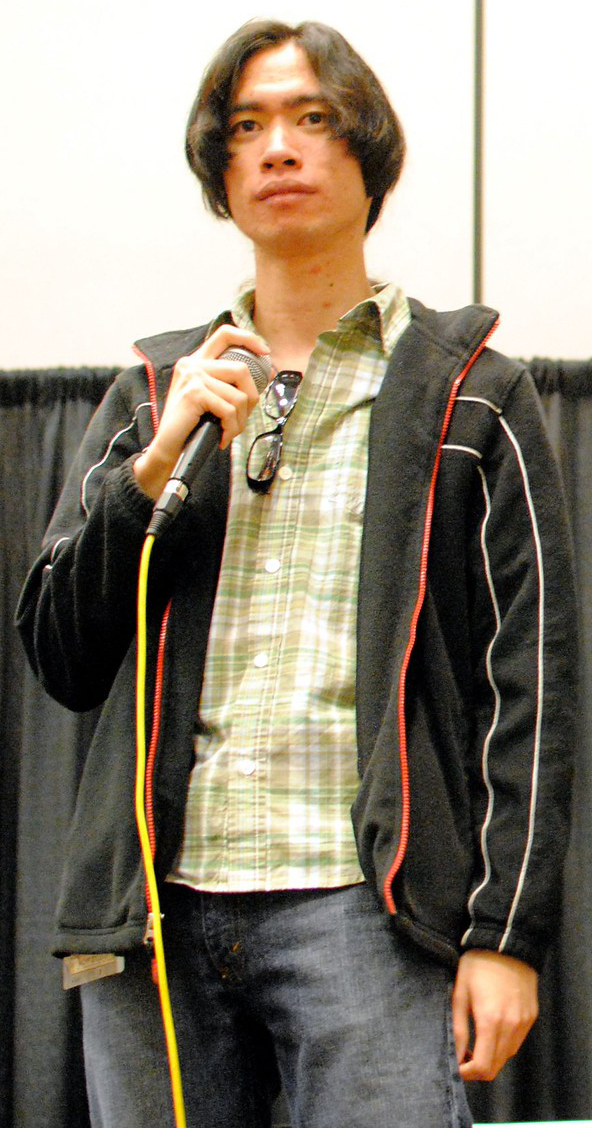
Takeru Satoh portrays Kenshin in the live-action films, while Micah Solusod dubs him for the English release.

Watsuki received letters from fans describing Megumi Ogata's audiobook voice as a "good fit" for Kenshin. Watsuki said that he imagined Kenshin's voice to be "more neutral". The fact that the audiobook voice actors, especially Ogata and Tomokazu Seki, who portrayed Sanosuke, did not voice their corresponding roles in the anime disappointed Watsuki.

In the anime adaptation of Rurouni Kenshin, Watsuki's designs were combined with the voice talents of voice actress Mayo Suzukaze. She said that she started feeling like Kenshin after years of work as his voice, but says that providing the voice for his character was one of her best experiences. In producing the English dub version of the series, Media Blasters considered following suit, with Mona Marshall considered a finalist to voice Kenshin. Richard Hayworth was eventually selected for the role, giving Kenshin's character a more masculine voice in the English adaptation. Marshall was also selected to voice the younger Kenshin during flashback scenes. Clark Cheng, Media Blasters dub script writer, said that localizing Kenshin's unusual speech was a difficult process. His use of de gozaru and oro were not only character trademarks that indicated his state of mind, but important elements to the story. However, neither is directly translatable into English, and in the end the company chose to replace de gozaru with "that I did," "that I am," or "that I do." Kenshin's signature oro was replaced with "huah" to simulate a "funny sound" that had no real meaning. Daryl Surat of Otaku USA said that the grammar in Kenshin's dialogue in the Media Blasters dub and subtitles resemble the grammar in the dialogue of Yoda, a character in Star Wars. Saito is replacing Suzukaze with the 2023 series which appealed to him since he was a fan of the series ever since he was a child and looks forward to creating his own take.

In the live-actions films of the series, Kenshin was played by Takeru Satoh. In casting Satoh, director Keishi Ōtomo said the actor was a good fit for the character, citing their physical similarities. Producer Shinzō Matsuhashi shared similar feelings as Ōtomo. During the making of this film, both Watsuki and his wife found Satoh as an ideal actor him. Watsuki was surprised by Satoh's work as well as the special effects in the first film which made Kenshin's character realistic. For the Kyoto duology films, Ōtomo said he did not have to put much advice to Satoh as his acting in the first film attracted multiple positive reactions by the staff and the audience. He then stated "Even without saying this or that from the side, he created an image of Kenshin, including his behavior, swordplay, and speech, through the necessary preparation and hard work. So I didn't worry at all".

During an interview, Satoh said Rurouni Kenshin was one of the first manga he read to the point he would play sword-fights with his friends. Additionally, once he was cast as Kenshin, Satoh started intense swordsmanship training. Satoh said he liked Kenshin's character to the point of enjoying role in the three films. However, the actor expressed pressure in doing the role as a result of having to take part in multiple fighting scenes. Nevertheless, Satoh said he enjoyed Kenshin's lines due to the impact they have on most characters, most notably his enemies. Due to the Kyoto films showing a darker characterization of Kenshin as he struggles against different strong rivals, Satoh also said his work became more challenging. Still, he found it interesting. A scene that Satoh enjoyed was Kenshin's fight against Sawagejō Chō due to the fact Kenshin is forced to attack his enemy even though he does not know his weapon is deadly which goes against his morals; as a result, Satoh briefly showed Kenshin's hitokiri side for a brief moment. The actor said he discussed this scene with the director who pleased with the result. Kenshin's strongest technique, the Amakakeru Ryū no Hirameki, was Satoh's favorite move as he likes its meaning. While Kenshin shouts his attacks' names in both manga and anime, Satoh instead decided to say the names after performing those moves.

During shooting of the film Rurouni Kenshin: The Final, the battle between Kenshin and Enishi had to be remade several times because Satoh got exhausted of moving four times in total. Satoh praised Arata's work as Enishi as he made the antagonist terrifying to the point the comical Kenshin acts with more tension in response to his threats which made him drop the signature sound effect "Oro". Arata also praised Satoh's works as he carried the franchise across several years in the live-action films. Watsuki believes that Takeru Satoh's portrayal of the main character stands out as stronger than the manga one, most notably in The Final.

== Appearances ==
=== In Rurouni Kenshin ===
Himura Kenshin, born Shinta (心太) is a legendary former assassin. He is a peerless swordsman who practices the Hiten Mitsurugi-ryū (飛天御剣流; literally "Flying Honorable Sword Style"), a fictional ancient sword art based on Battōjutsu, that enables him to exercise superhuman speed and reflexes, foresee his opponent's movements in battle, as well as perform many powerful sword techniques. Most of his techniques were originally intended to be lethal, but Kenshin has since modified the use of these techniques in accordance with his vow never to kill. To this end, he fights using his sakabatō (a reverse-edge sword). After finishing his job as an assassin in the Ishin Shishi, Kenshin assumes the life of a wanderer. Ten years after the Revolution, he arrives in Tokyo, where he meets Kamiya Kaoru. She invites him to stay in her dojo even after she discovers that Kenshin is the "Battōsai". Kenshin wants to protect every individual from danger without harming others. Formerly known as "the strongest hitokiri," Kenshin is the main target of many old enemies and people who want to gain his title. Thus, he avoids letting others get too close to him for their own protection. However, he eventually begins to rely on his friends, allowing them to fight alongside him.

During his stay in Tokyo, Kenshin establishes lifelong relationships with many people, including ex-enemies, such as the former Shinsengumi member Saitō Hajime. Saitō's arrival is a test ex-Ishin Shishi Ōkubo Toshimichi made in order see Kenshin's power to see if he can defeat Shishio Makoto. Shishio is the brutal, once-successor to Kenshin's position as Chōshū's hitokiri, masterminds a movement seeking to overthrow the Meiji Government, Kenshin leaves Tokyo to stop him. To defeat such a foe, Kenshin is forced to resume his training and mend his relationship with his teacher Hiko Seijūrō, who taught and took care of him as a child. He learns the Kuzu-ryūsen (九頭龍閃; lit. "Nine-headed Dragon Strike"), which deals nine simultaneous strikes to the fundamental targets of swordsmanship. The Kuzu-ryūsen, however, is a part of the test used for the initiation in learning his strongest technique: Amakakeru Ryū no Hirameki (天翔龍閃; literally "Heavens Gliding Dragon Flash"; Viz translation – "Dragon Flight of Heaven"), a battōjutsu that surpasses the speed of the Kuzu-ryūsen. Even if the technique is defeated, it can generate a vacuum in its wake and sucking the opponent in; as this happens, the body is spun around for a second stronger strike. Throughout the training, Kenshin increasingly wants to survive to any combat so that Kaoru will not be shocked by his death. After finishing his training, Kenshin's friends reunite with him and help him defeat Shishio and his army.

Months later, a man known as Yukishiro Enishi starts attacking all the people Kenshin meets as an act of revenge for the death of his sister Yukishiro Tomoe. At this point, it is revealed that Kenshin was married to Tomoe in the Bakumatsu, but accidentally killed her while trying to rescue her from a group of assassins. When Enishi learns of Kenshin's feelings towards Kaoru, he sets out to kidnap her. He succeeds and leaves behind a professionally made decoy of Kaoru with a sword in her heart, making everyone believe that she has been murdered. Kenshin falls into a severe depression and runs off to a village of outcasts to mourn. After a while, he is forced to stand up and fight upon learning one his friend is in danger, returning to his former self in the process. Meanwhile, his friends discover Kaoru is alive. The group goes to rescue her on Enishi's island. A battle between Kenshin and Enishi follows. When Kenshin wins, he and Kaoru return home. Afterwards, Kenshin learns that since the Hiten Mitsurugi-ryū is only suitable for a wide-framed muscular build like that of Seijūrō's, his body will eventually begin to deteriorate and he will soon be unable to use it again. Five years later, Kenshin is married to Kaoru and has a son named Kenji. After an encounter with Kaoru's student Myōjin Yahiko, Kenshin gives his sakabatō to him as a gift for his coming-of-age.

=== In other media ===
==== Printed works ====
Kenshin first appeared in two chapters of Rurouni, Meiji Swordsman Romantic Story, the pilot chapters of the manga, in which he arrives in Tokyo and defeats several groups of villains attacking families. In these stories, Kenshin is given a similar personality to the one he has in the series, but his name is not mentioned. Following the original series' ending, Watsuki wrote two shorts where Kenshin makes brief appearances; in Yahiko no Sabato Kenshin and Kaoru entrust Yahiko with taking care of a dojo whereas in Haru ni Sakura he reunites with all his friends and learn about the place where Saito left and learn of his friend Sagara Sanosuke through a letter after he left Japan.

The manga's reboot, Rurouni Kenshin: Restoration, follows Kenshin's stay in Tokyo as in the original series. After attacking a drug dealer known as Takeda Kanryu, Kenshin becomes the target of many of his warriors. This leads to a fight against his old enemy Jin-e from the Shinsengumi who tries to encourage his hitokiri be reborn by using Kaoru as a hostage and nearly killing her. However, as Kenshin is about kill Jin-e, Kaoru stops him; following Jin-e's suicide, Kenshin stays in Kaoru's dojo. Before the reboot, Watsuki also wrote a prequel chapter where Kenshin meets a western doctor during his years of wandering.

In 2016, Watsuki wrote a sidestory named The Ex-Con Ashitaro in which Kenshin appears to save the young title character from a group of enemies. Shueisha later revealed Ashitaro is the prequel to an upcoming from Rurouni Kenshin: the Hokkaido Arc. In the Hokkaido arc, Kenshin's group learns that Kaoru's father is alive and decide to go to Hokkaido to find him. Yahiko returns Kenshin his sakabato to aid him in possible fights but Kenshin's stamina keeps reaching its limit when fighting. Although Kenshin is primarily interested in finding Kaoru's father, he learns from Saito's adopted son Mishima Eiji of a new threat in Hokkaido who aim to conquer Japan rather than westernize the country. For this purpose, Saito calls Shishio's surviving allies and one Shinsengumi, Nagakura Shinpachi, to aid them in the battle. Sanosuke also returns to aid Kenshin in the battle. During the multiple fights with Kenkaku Heiki, Kenshin's body continues weakening until he falls into a coma and is rescued by Shinomori Aoshi.

In 2021, Watsuki created the manga "Sakabatō Shogeki" (逆刃刀 初撃; "Reverse-Blade Katana: First Bout") that shows the first time Kenshin used his sakabatō.

==== Other works ====
In the 1997 movie Rurouni Kenshin: The Motion Picture, Kenshin meets a samurai named Takimi Shigure, who tries to overthrow the Meiji Government and avenge the deaths of his family during the Bakumatsu. Kenshin encounters Shigure and defeats him to avoid the start of a war while avenging one of his friends killed by Kenshin in the past. However, he fails to bring his fight give a peaceful resolution as Shigure's own men betray him and several of his soldiers die alongside him.

In the OVAs of the series, Rurouni Kenshin: Trust & Betrayal from 1999, Kenshin's life in the Bakumatsu is explored. In Rurouni Kenshin: Reflection released in 2001, as time passes, Kenshin becomes tortured with guilt for leading a happy life after such a destructive past. He decides to wander again, and Kaoru strongly supports him, promising to welcome him home with a smile and their child. Kenshin eventually becomes ravaged by an unknown disease. However, he decides to assist in the First Sino-Japanese War as he had promised the Meiji Government. After the war's end, Sanosuke discovers a gravely injured Kenshin on the shore, who has lost his memory and cannot return to Japan. Sanosuke arranges for Kenshin's return to Tokyo and Kaoru. The two finally meet, and Kenshin collapses into her arms as he clutches her. Kaoru then notices Kenshin's scar has faded away, signifying his death. After watching the last OVA, Nobuhiro Watsuki was quite unhappy with how the story ended, saying that "Kenshin went through so much crap and deserved a happy ending."

Kenshin also appears in other animated retelling of the series titled New Kyoto Arc from 2011 and 2012.

In the live-action movie trilogy, Kenshin is portrayed by Takeru Satoh. The first film retells Kenshin's arrival to Tokyo while making new allies and enemies whereas the second and the third ones from 2014 show his fight against Shishio's forces. The Final focuses on his fight against Enishi's forces while The Beginning focuses on his past as a hitokiri and meeting with Tomoe.

Kenshin is a playable character in all of the Rurouni Kenshin video games, as well as the crossovers Jump Super Stars and Jump Ultimate Stars. In June 2013, Kenshin was confirmed to be a playable character alongside Bleach's protagonist Ichigo Kurosaki in J-Stars Victory Vs for the PlayStation 3. In celebrating the 50th anniversary of the magazine Weekly Shonen Jump, a cardgame was developed by Bandai Namco Entertainment with Kenshin appearing as a character card.

It was announced in November 2018 that Kenshin Himura along with Shishio Makoto would be playable characters in the Weekly Shōnen Jump cross-over video game, Jump Force, developed by Bandai Namco Entertainment. Teppei Koike also portrays Kenshin in the Kyoto arc musical and has expressed joy of doing it, having read the manga when he was younger.

== Reception ==
=== Popularity ===
Kenshin has been highly popular with the Rurouni Kenshin reader base, having ranked first in every Weekly Shōnen Jump popularity poll of the series, always with more than double the votes of the second place character. Two polls by the official Rurouni Kenshin anime featured Kenshin as one of the series' most popular characters. In the first, Kenshin was at the top, while in the second, he placed second. His Battōsai incarnation was also fifth in the latter poll. Kenshin has also been featured various times in the Animage's Anime Grand Prix polls, ranking as one of the most popular male anime characters. In a Newtype poll in March 2010, Kenshin was voted the eighth most popular male anime character from the 1990s. An abundance of merchandise have been released in Kenshin's likeness including keychains, action figures, and plush dolls. Since the manga was published, non-functional and functional sakabatō have been produced for purchase by collectors and fans. In a poll by Anime News Network, Kenshin was voted as the second best male anime character with long hair, being surpassed by Edward Elric from Fullmetal Alchemist. In 2014, IGN ranked him as the fifth greatest anime character of all time, saying that: "Although Kenshin's momentary lapses make him a complete badass and set the stage for some of the most epic sword battles ever animated, Kenshin always goes back to his sweet persona once the danger is gone." Kenshin was also fifth in IGN's Top 25 Anime Characters of All Time with writer Chris Mackenzie describing him as: "A classic example of a classic anime type, the peace-loving killing machine." Kenshin's Amakakeru Ryū no Hirameki technique has ranked third in a Japanese survey that featured the most popular moves in manga and anime. In a poll by Anime News Network, he was voted as the top "guy". In a Japanese TV special from August 2017, Kenshin was voted as the 16th "strongest hero" from the Showa Era as well as the 15th one from the Heisei Era.

Serdar Yegulalp from ThoughtCo. also listed the series as one of the "Best anime romances" with a bigger focus on Kenshin and Kaoru. For the 9th Asian Film Awards, Satoh was nominated in the "Best Actor" category for his portrayal of Kenshin. In the Japan Action Awards 2012, Satoh also won an award in the category "Best Action Actor".

In an early chapter of the manga, Kenshin teaches Yahiko how to face multiple enemies at the same time; Rather than facing them, Kenshin instead escapes so to defeat the fastest one and then runs away again to repeat the same method. This method became viral in the gaming community in July 2023 as players dealing with challenging enemies in Elden Ring, The Legend of Zelda: Tears of the Kingdom, among others, started using this tactic to complete the games.

=== Critical reception ===
Several publications covering manga, anime, video games, and other media have praised and criticized the character. Tasha Robinson from SciFi.com remarked "Kenshin's schizoid personal conflict between his ruthless-killer side and his country-bumpkin" side was a perfect way to develop good stories which was one of the factors that made the series popular. Marco Oliveier from the Nelson Mandela Metropolitan University said that the sakabatō symbolises Kenshin's oath not to kill again which has been found challenging by other warriors. According to Ashley D. Lake from UC Riverside, Kaoru represents the Daitō-ryū Aiki-jūjutsu values defied in the Meiji era that Kenshin chooses to protect due to the values it offers to people, something rare in anime series due to prominent violence during the time Rurouni Kenshin premiered in Japan. Megan Lavey from Mania Entertainment highly praised Kenshin's characterization in the manga due to his seriousness as well how he intends to tell his friends his feelings contrasting some episodes from the anime where Kenshin is more comical. Lavey also highly praised the fight between Kenshin and Saito Hajime in the manga's seventh volume and Kenshin's killing intent displayed against his rival. Similarly, his first fight against Saito in the anime adaptation earned high praise by Anime News Network writer Mark A. Grey considering one of the best ones from the series. Entertainment Weekly found comical how whenever Kenshin is not fighting he is doing the laundry or cleans the dojo which brings a light tone that appealed the writer. T.H.E.M. Anime Reviews website criticized Kenshin's super deformed appearance in comedy scenes claiming it does not suit the context of the character or the series. Mania.com remarks that Kenshin has a "smartass" attitude in a review of volume 8; while they noted that is a common attitude in the anime that makes him look out-of-character. Anime News Network's Mike Crandol praised Kenshin for being a character that all people enjoy watching due to his comedy scenes. Facultad de Lenguas (Universidad Nacional de Córdoba compared Kenshin to Musashi Miyamoto from Vagabond due to their relationship with historical figures rarely explored in manga. In About.com's Top 8 Anime Love Stories, Kenshin and Kaoru's relationship ranked 8th with Katherine Luther noting it is a "classic romance." Bamboo Dong from Anime News Network highly criticized Kenshin in the OVA's retelling of the Kyoto arc for lacking all the development he faced in both the manga and anime of this arc.

For Sony's OVAs of the franchise, there have also been multiple response. Matthew Anderson from DVD Vision Japan found the series' title "Samurai X" unfitting for Kenshin as the reviewer regarded the character as a hired killer rather than as a samurai as seen across the prequel OVAs. Rio Yañez from Animerica said one of the major themes of Trust is understanding the repercussions and after-effects murder can have, something that Kenshin has yet to comprehend though others have tried to point it out to him. Mike Crando from Anime News Network highly enjoyed Kenshin's characterization in the prequel as he refers it as "it is a fascinating and emotional character study in its own right" due to Kenshin's character development across these four episodes from "an idealistic youth to a cold-hearted killer, only to be redeemed through love lost and the realization that swinging his sword is destroying his own life as well as the lives of the people on the receiving end". Additionally, the reviewer enjoyed the OVA's director's cut for showing more fights between Kenshin and Shinsenguimi, the special forces where Saito originated from. Earl Cressey from DVD Talk found Kenshin as a "complex" character and said his relationship with Yukishiro Tomoe might appeal the viewers. Carlos Ross from T.H.E.M. Anime Reviews shared similar feelings and enjoyed the romance between Kenshin Tomoe despite its tragic outcome. Yegulalp from ThoughtCo. also listed the series as one of the "Best anime romances" with a bigger focus on Kenshin and Tomoe.

Kenshin's development in the Rurouni Kenshin: Reflection OVA series has received negative reviews by many publications. Anime News Network also adds that in Reflection he "continues to be his old mopey self" and criticizes the fact that he never says "oro", while IGN felt that some moments of the relationship between Kenshin and Kaoru were depressing. While criticizing the characters' sad decisions, Serdar Yegulalp from About.com wondered whether the OVAs had to make viewers accept Kenshin's death wish after so much time of wandering and feeling a mortal disease. However, some reviewers noted Kenshin's personality in the OVAs was one of the most complex ever to be animated remarking on the fact that he can not forget his bloody past, despite having a peaceful life. Don Houston from DVD Talk noted the controversy between the fandom as they refrained from treating Reflection as canon due to how tragic the life of Kenshin's family became. Ridwan Khan from Animefringe shared similar feelings, but noted Kenshin had no new enemies to fight after Enishi, leaving him with his disease story arc.

Besides the printed series and its animated adaptations, there have been comments regarding Kenshin's role in the live-action films where he is played by Takeru Satoh] Deborah Young from The Hollywood Reporter comically compared the character to Michael Jackson but praised his portrayal of swordsmanship. Matt Schley from Otaku USA commented that Satoh did a good performance making Kenshin into likeable protagonist. Both Nick Creamer and Ko Ransom from Anime News Network shared similar opinions, noting Satoh managed to adapt the character well. Schley once again praised Satoh's role in the finale alongside other actors. For the last movie, Creamer expressed that Satoh kept doing a fine work as acting as Kenshin, praising his battles like Young. While enjoying the final duel between Kenshin and Shishio Makoto, Hayley Scanlon from UK Anime Network felt it took too much screentime. Lito B. Zulueta from The Enquirer also enjoyed the fight between Kenshin and Shishio, the actors, as well as how the character of Kenshin has helped popularized the term of samurai in western culture. David West from Neo criticized Kenshin's long training with his teacher but still found that in the film, Kenshin's vow of not killing anybody remains true. Satoh's action sequences from The Final and his rivalry with Enishi were also the subject of praise. Meanwhile, the younger Kenshin from The Beginning shocked critics for how coldhearted he is in his assassin works during the Bakumatsu but changes into a more peaceful person when meeting Tomoe. In retrospect, F. Liu from International Journal of Education and Humanities noticed that the accidental murder of Tomoe caused the awakening of the protagonist's wiser personality as he realized the horrible actions he has been causing leading to his transformation into a wanderer once the Bakumatsu ends, abandoning his bushido and becoming more benevolent in the process.

In The Renegotiation of Modernity, Kenshin's heroic nature as a wanderer was compared to both Luke Skywalker and Harry Potter due to how he wishes to protect the weak people, seeing nothing wrong with such trait as heavily explored in the series when confronting the young Seta Sojiro who had opposite values in terms how should the strong men act. This soft masculinity exemplified. also in the balance between Kenshin's supernatural strength and small design, led a major impact in the audience due to how likable the protagonist is. His introduction marks his values with the sword which also affected Kaoru, Yahiko's and Sanosuke's values upon their meetings. In doing so, Rurouni Kenshin laid" more than twenty years ago the foundation of a fresh paradigm of humanity based on tenderness and mutual acceptance as a counter-movement to the individualism, competition and efficiency that characterize the project of modernity".
