= Sagara Sanosuke =

Fictional character from Rurouni Kenshin

- Rurouni Kenshin character
- Sagara Sanosuke on the cover of Rurouni Kenshin Kanzenban Volume 5
- First appearance: Rurouni Kenshin Act 5: The Fight Merchant
- Created by: Nobuhiro Watsuki
- Portrayed by: Munetaka Aoki
- Voiced by: Japanese; Tomokazu Seki (drama CD); Yūji Ueda (1996 series); Yuriko Fuchizaki (1996 series, child); Taku Yashiro (2023 series); Natsumi Fujiwara (2023 series, child); English; Derek Stephen Prince (Samurai X version); Lex Lang (1996 series); Brianne Siddall (1996 series, child); Gray G. Haddock (OVAs and movie); Eric Vale (live-action films); Darius Johnson (2023 series)

In-universe information
- Alias: Zanza (斬左)
- Nickname: Sano (English anime only)
- Affiliations: Sekihō Army (formerly)

Sagara Sanosuke (相楽 左之助) is a fictional character from the Rurouni Kenshin manga and anime series created by Nobuhiro Watsuki. In the English anime adaptations he is known as Sanosuke Sagara and nicknamed Sano. Watsuki, being a fan of the Shinsengumi, created Sanosuke by basing his name and characteristics on that of a real Shinsengumi member named Harada Sanosuke.

Set during a fictional version of Japan in the pre-Meiji period, Sanosuke is a former member of the Sekihō Army. When the group is destroyed by the Meiji Government, he becomes a fighter-for-hire to calm his anger by fighting. During his introduction in the series, he encounters the wanderer Himura Kenshin, who easily defeats him and is able to convince him to stop his mercenary work and instead start protecting people. After that encounter, Sanosuke becomes Kenshin's best friend as well as his partner in most of their fights.

Sanosuke appears in the featured films of the series and in other media relating to the Rurouni Kenshin franchise, including a plethora of electronic games and original video animations (OVAs). Numerous anime and manga publications have commented on Sanosuke's character. Mania Entertainment praised his character development, noting that he becomes more trustworthy and reliable as the series progresses. SciFi.com referred to him as a "video-game icon", and noted how he is portrayed as a "tragic figure". Sanosuke has been popular with the Rurouni Kenshin reader base, placing second in every popularity poll. Merchandise based on Sanosuke has also been released, including key chains, and plush dolls.

== Creation and conception ==
Lamp, the main character of Mashin Bōken Tan Lamp-Lamp, was used as Sanosuke's visual motif.

Sanosuke was one of the last major figures of the series to be created. Watsuki created him to be Kenshin's best friend, who is willing to punch him when he is sad to make him "wake up" from his sadness. Although Sanosuke is a main character in the series, Watsuki felt that he could not write everything he wanted about him, and thought that making him the title character of a series would prove interesting.

The character is based on Shinsengumi member Harada Sanosuke. Watsuki describes Sanosuke's visual motif by referring to his design model, Lamp, the main character of Susumu Sendo and Takeshi Obata's Mashin Bōken Tan Lamp-Lamp. Watsuki, working as an assistant on Obata's manga, formed the character by doodling in sketchbooks, adding and subtracting elements from the proposed character "with blessings from the original artist, of course." An elder Sanosuke was drafted by Watsuki to appear in the manga's finale but this idea was scrapped. In the manga's final story arc, the design was used for Sanosuke's father, Higashidani Kamishimoemon.

Redesign of Sanosuke in the kanzenban series.

In July 2006, the Japanese publishers of Rurouni Kenshin released the kanzenban edition. In the fifth kanzenban, Watsuki redesigned the character of Sanosuke in a draft version. To emphasize his hate of the Meiji Government, Watsuki drew the Japanese kanji for "evil" (惡, aku) on the back of Sanosuke's jacket in the original series, but on the kanzenban redesign, the tattoo is located inside his clothes. Unlike in the manga where Sanosuke uses an oversized zanbatō as a weapon, Watsuki gave him a more historically authentic zanbatō; a sword notably thinner and longer in design. He also gave him an armor-like cloth to make him look more as a warrior.

The fact that the CD book voice actors, especially Tomokazu Seki and Megumi Ogata, who portrayed Sanosuke and Kenshin in the CD books, respectively, did not get their corresponding roles in the anime disappointed Watsuki. Ueda, Sanosuke's voice actor in the Japanese anime, commented that voicing Sanosuke in the original video animations was very complicated because his character was notably older and he has not acted in the role for a long period. He also said that he would have liked to see more fights involving Sanosuke in the original video animations, but was happy to see that Sanosuke had matured as a character. Lex Lang, the voice actor of Sanosuke in the English adaptation of the anime, commented that his first impression of Sanosuke was as a fight-driven character motivated by anger, but as the story continued Sanosuke became friendly and more likable. Because his voice is noticeably different from Ueda's, Lang tries to create his own interpretation of Sanosuke's character. Lang has noted that the scene in episode 22 of the anime, in which Sanosuke is afraid of a train because he believes it is a demon, was the most enjoyable scene for him to record; he added "I recently saw it and had some big laughs."

In producing the English dub version of the series, Media Blasters chose Lex Lang as Sanosuke's voice actor. When writing Sanosuke's dialogue, Clark Cheng, the writer of the English dub script, noted that the character was smarter than he would have liked in the first few episodes, so Cheng tried slowly to change the character's dialogue to make Sanosuke seem less intelligent so he would be more similar to the equivalent in the Japanese version of the series.

== Appearances ==
=== In Rurouni Kenshin ===
Born February 1860 in Nagano, Sanosuke is a former member of the Sekihō Army. Having admired his captain Sagara Sōzō, he takes the family name Sagara from him. But when the revolutionary government encounters financial problems, it labels the Sekihō Army as frauds in order to "bury their promises". Sōzō is executed, leaving Sanosuke as one of the few survivors. Consumed with hatred for the Ishin Shishi, and guilt at not being able to protect his hero, Sanosuke becomes a fight merchant in Tokyo. Over the next ten years, he gains a reputation as one of the strongest hired fighters of the city. The destruction of the Sekihō Army and the loss of all his friends has caused Sanosuke to hate the Meiji Government and he wears the Japanese kanji for "evil" on the back of his jacket. He bears this symbol as a mark of his loyalty towards his past in the Sekihō Army. Sanosuke uses an enormous zanbatō in battle, giving him the moniker Zanza (斬左). The blade has no edge and Sanosuke only uses it to smash and crush his opponents.

Sanosuke performing the Futae no Kiwami

In his introduction in the manga, Sanosuke is hired to fight Kenshin, but after the former assassin defeats him, he learns of the truth of Kenshin's no-kill approach and becomes one of his allies. After Kenshin defeats him and breaks his zanbatō, Sanosuke decides to focus on unarmed combat. When the criminal Shishio Makoto tries to conquer Japan, Sanosuke helps Kenshin in the fight against him. While on his trip to Kyoto to aid him, Sanosuke was trained in kenpo from a warrior monk named Yūkyūzan Anji. Anji taught Sanosuke a secret technique called Futae no Kiwami (二重の極み; lit. "Mastery of the Two Layers"). Futae no Kiwami is a special art in which the user performs two hits in quick succession with any part of his body. The first hit with the proximal interphalangeal joint neutralizes the hardness of the target, then the second blow, struck with the proximal phalanx, breaks the target before it recovers from the force of the first blow. Using his mastery from this art with his right hand allows him to defeat the third most powerful opponent in Shishio's army: Anji.

Months later, in an act of revenge on Kenshin, Yukishiro Enishi fakes Kamiya Kaoru's death. Kenshin loses the will to live and when Sanosuke is unable to reach him, he wanders away from Tokyo. In his wandering, he is reunited with his family in the Shinano Province (Shinshū). Years prior to the start of the series, Sanosuke left the family at the age of 9 to join the Sekihō Army. Although he does not reveal his identity to his family, upon learning of their poor situation Sanosuke attacks a former Ishin Shishi who was mistreating them and the town. During these fights, Sanosuke's right hand is permanently damaged from the overuse Futae no Kiwami. and overcomes this disability when he discovers using both hands in succession which lessens the impact to his damaged hand. After protecting his family, he returns to Tokyo to rescue Kaoru with his friends. After a successful rescue, Sanosuke leaves Japan and travels the world to avoid being arrested for attacking the Ishin Shishi. The manga ends with a letter from Sanosuke to his friends that he is returning to Japan to be reunited with them.

=== In other media ===
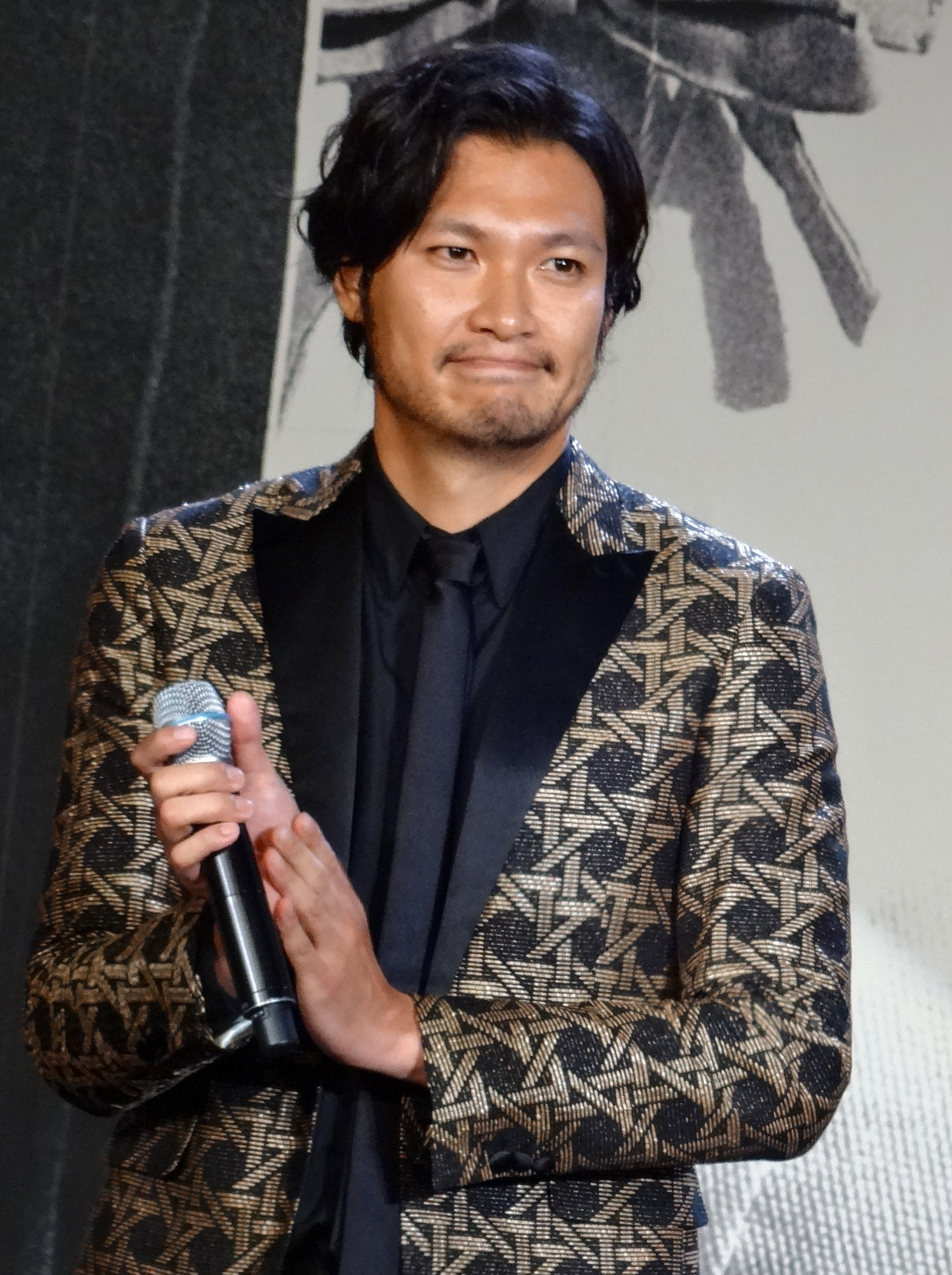
Munetaka Aoki portrays Sanosuke in the live-action films.

In the Rurouni Kenshin: The Motion Picture, Sanosuke helps to stop the samurai Takimi Shigure from overthrowing the Meiji Government as an act of revenge. In the original video animations of the series, he is given a more humanized design and a more emotional personality. In the non-canon Rurouni Kenshin: Reflection, an older Sanosuke discovers Kenshin gravely injured when he is traveling in Asia and sends Kenshin back to Tokyo by himself, contradicting his character development by his creator, Watsuki. Sanosuke is also a playable character in almost all the Rurouni Kenshin video games except Jump Super Stars and Jump Ultimate Stars, in which he isn't playable but is available as a Battle koma.

In Rurouni Kenshin: Restoration, Sanosuke is hired by Takeda Kanryu to kill Kenshin but he only wishes to fight Kenshin. After losing to Kenshin, Sanosuke agrees to help him with taking care of Kaoru's dojo.

In the live-action film series adapting Rurouni Kenshin, Sanosuke is portrayed by Munetaka Aoki.

== Reception ==
Among the Rurouni Kenshin reader base Sanosuke has been popular, having ranked second in every Shonen Jump popularity poll of the series and also ranked fifth in the "Kenshin's Biggest Rival" poll featuring all of Kenshin's opponents. Merchandise based on Sanosuke has been released, including sweat bands, keychains, and plush dolls.

Several anime and manga publications have provided both praise and criticism of Sanosuke's character. Anime News Network said that Sanosuke's first fight in the series against Kenshin was stereotypical for an action series due to the differences between Sanosuke's and Kenshin's personalities, and to the music used in the anime that gives the impression that Kenshin would win. In the Critical Survey of Graphic Novels: Manga, multiple writers acknowledged how both Sanosuke and Yahiko spend their time in the series searching for ways to become stronger. However, they do it for a heroic reason which is assisting Kenshin. SciFi.com commended him for being a good source of comic relief and described his appearance as a video-game icon. However, they commented he was a "tragic figure whose goofy peccadilloes have solid reasons behind them" due to being unable to avoid the destruction of the Sekihotai army and feeling guilty due to it. Mania Entertainment praised Sanosuke's character development and transformation from an enemy of Kenshin into one of his most stalwart friends. Chris Beveridge appreciated the fight scenes from Restoration due to how Sanosuke is presented stronger than in the original manga, making his duel with Kenshin more enjoyable. In the Samurai X: Reflection original video animation, Mike Crandol of Anime News Network referred to Sanosuke's revised design as "pretty awkward" since Crandol felt Sanosuke's original character design was "perhaps being too cartoonish to translate well into this new style," with the "new style" being the "decidedly more realistic look" exhibited in all of the Samurai X original video animations.

Sanosuke's role in the live-action films has also been the subject of commentary by writers. Munetaka Aoki's acting was praised by Ko Ransom from Anime News Network, finding it faithful to the original character. Nick Creamer from the same site also noted how in the first live-action film, Sanosuke's characterization was identical to the original series as he is initially an enemy to Kenshin but later becomes his friend. On the other hand, Creamer criticized Sanosuke's portrayal in the second film as he stated that he "tends to chew the scenery in his appearances" to the point he found him less realistic. For the liveaction film Rurouni Kenshin: The Legend Ends, David West from Neo enjoyed Sanosuke's fight against Anji but felt it was too similar to his fight against the Christian priest from the first film.
