= Shishio Makoto =

Fictional character from the Rurouni Kenshin manga series

- Rurouni Kenshin character
- Shishio Makoto on the cover of Rurouni Kenshin Kanzenban Volume 14
- First appearance: Rurouni Kenshin Act 61: Man Without Emotion
- Created by: Nobuhiro Watsuki
- Portrayed by: Tatsuya Fujiwara
- Voiced by: Japanese; Masanori Ikeda (1996 series, New Kyoto Arc); Makoto Furukawa (2023 series); English; Stephen Apostolina (1996 series; Sony dub); Steven Blum (1996 series; Bang Zoom! dub); David Wald (New Kyoto Arc, live-action films); Mick Lauer (2023 series)

In-universe information
- Title: Hitokiri (人斬り)
- Affiliations: Ishin Shishi (formerly); Juppongatana

Shishio Makoto (Japanese: 志々雄 真実), known in the English anime in Western order as Makoto Shishio, is a fictional character from the Rurouni Kenshin manga series created by Nobuhiro Watsuki and the main antagonist from the Kyoto Arc, the second arc of the series. Shishio is the successor of the Hitokiri (人斬り), or assassin Himura Kenshin, the protagonist of the series.

After working for Ishin Shishi, the new Meiji government tried killing Shishio by dousing him in oil and burning him alive. However, Shishio manages to survive and recruits an army led by the Juppongatana to get his revenge and take down Japan. With the government's members fearing their deaths, they recruit both Kenshin and the former Shinsengumi Saito Hajime to defeat his forces. Besides the manga, Shishio has appeared in the series' anime adaptation, games, as well as two live-action films. He is also the protagonist of the manga prequel Rurouni Kenshin: Master of Flame, showing the origins of the Juppongatana.

Watsuki was inspired by Shinsengumi Serizawa Kamo in the making of the character while SNK's characters from the fighting games Samurai Shodown served as the main influence for his design. Watsuki aimed to portray Shishio as a ruthless, coldhearted antagonist, making him "evil" due to his actions. In the Japanese anime, Masanori Ikeda voices the character with various members taking the role in multiple English adaptations. Tatsuya Fujiwara portrayed him in the live-action films.

Critical reception of Shishio's character has been positive due to his villain traits and powers he demonstrates across the Kyoto arc. Due to Shishio being so powerful, writers were divided in his downfall being a copout but still appreciated due to how it affects other characters. Fujiwara's acting was the subject of praise.

== Creation and conception ==
Watsuki said that his editor wanted him to do "a big story", leading Watsuki to create Shishio. Therefore, according to Watsuki, Shishio had no model for his personality. Watsuki originally intended for Shishio to be motivated for revenge since it would make it easier for Watsuki to express Shishio's grief towards the government. However, Watsuki believed that this would make the story "smaller in scale". Therefore, Watsuki had Shishio motivated by revenge and a desire to conquer, therefore making him destructive in a manner similar to that of Serizawa Kamo of the Shinsengumi. Watsuki believes that some influence from Genjuro Kibagami of Samurai Shodown II appeared in Shishio.

The visual model for Shishio is Aonuma Shizuma of The Inugamis (1976); Watsuki saw this film as a child and took influences from it. When it was decided that Shishio would be burned on much of his body, Watsuki thought of a rubber mask similar to the one that Shizuma has. Watsuki decided against this idea since he felt it would be difficult to realistically convey rubber in black and white, he felt he could not portray "the sheer agony" of Shishio's condition, and it would be more difficult for Watsuki to draw Shishio's expressions. Ultimately Watsuki decided to have Shishio wear bandages. Since Watsuki felt having the character simply wrapped in bandages would not "be exciting", the bandages on Shishio's face became crisscrossed, making what Watsuki describes as "weird headgear", and otherwise "fancied" the design. Watsuki wanted Shishio to be "cool, like Kibagami", so Watsuki added a "sexy companion", a pipe, a folding screen, and an umbrella. Shishio's "Homura Dama" technique is original to the series, while the "Guren Kaina" is, in Watsuki's words, "pretty much a rip of 'Daibaku Satsu'", a move by the "Shura" Sogetsu Kazama character in Samurai Shodown IV (Samurai Spirits: Amakusa's Descent, TenSamu).

In Volume 17 Watsuki stated that he thought, in retrospect, that Shishio was his version of "the appeal of evil". Watsuki explained that Shishio will not compromise his beliefs under any circumstances, has no objections to "using others as a means to an end", and seeks "absolute power" "with ruthless abandon". Watsuki stated that the character "is his own kind of ideal" and enjoyed drawing Shishio in his final fight with Kenshin. Watsuki felt that he could not draw the scene of Shishio's death as it appeared in his mind. Watsuki believes, "with some confidence", that the scene of Shishio in hell walking across a pile of skeletons is "as good a dramatization of a villain in RuroKen that we're ever going to get." Watsuki said that he would never write in a character like Shishio in all of the series he writes, but he planned to create a similar character in another series.

In history police were forbidden from entering the Mount Hiei temple grounds, so criminals gathered there and claimed that they were there for "religious enlightenment". Because of this Watsuki located Shishio's hideout on Mount Hiei in Rurouni Kenshin. In regard to Shishio's relationship with Seta Sojiro, Watsuki described Shishio as more of a mentor to him to the point Sojiro does not think on his own but instead his superior. Meanwhile, his lover Komagata Yumi was given the choice of dying with Shishio due to how Watsuki views Yumi liking Shishio even if she has to die and follow him to hell rather than living alone.

For the prequel series Rurouni Kenshin: Master of Flame, Watsuki aimed to tell parts of his character and allies he regretted not showing in the original series. Watsuki's wife and novelist, Kaoru Kurosaki, got fond of Shishio, stating that while she originally saw him as a regular character standing out due to his appearance, she ended appreciating his strength and thus wanted the prequel's Shishio be an equal to the original manga's Shishio.

== Appearances ==
=== In the Rurouni Kenshin manga ===
Shishio is introduced by word of mouth as successor to the name, hitokiri, when Himura Kenshin became a free wielding swordsman to protect members of the Ishin Shishi. During the Boshin War, Shishio was knocked out from a gunshot to the head, doused in oil and burned alive by the Ishin Shishi. He survived, sustaining severe damage to his entire body to the point that he must wear bandages day and night to cover his disfigured skin. It also limited the time he could fight. Shishio, with the aid from a man named Sadojima Hōji, assembled a group of the best fighters in Japan, called the Ten Swords (Juppongatana), to overthrow the Meiji government. He envisions a Japan ruled by him, enforcing the principles of Social Darwinism through Anarchism and chaotic fighting. Using this belief, Shishio runs a campaign against the Meiji government, as he felt it was too weak to effectively lead the country. He planned to strengthen the economy with petroleum once he took over the country. At some point, he met Komagata Yumi, a former high-ranking geisha who despised the Meiji Government's new policies on prostitution, with whom he shared a romantic relationship.

Kenshin and Saitō Hajime meet him once in Shingetsu Village. Disappointed with Kenshin's mercy on his minions, Shishio abandons the village and calls the Ten Swords. Soon after, Shishio begins to proceed with his master plan. Shishio had planned to have the Ten Swords burn down Kyoto. However, Kenshin and Saitō find that the plan to burn down Kyoto was just a diversion, and the Shishio's real plan was to use a steel plated battleship, Rengoku ("Purgatory") that Hōji had purchased for him to attack Tokyo. Kenshin, Saitō, and Sagara Sanosuke pursue and intercept Shishio in a harbor not far from his target destroy the Rengoku. Shishio arranges a duel to the death at Mount Hiei. Knowing that, Kenshin, Saitō, and Sanosuke travel there the next morning. While they were doing so, however, Shishio sent most of the Ten Swords out to kill Kenshin's friends at the Aoi-Ya, keeping only his strongest subordinates with him, and Aoshi. The members of the Ten Swords sent to the Aoi-Ya, however, are all defeated by Kenshin's allies.

After defeating Shinomori Aoshi and Sōjirō, Kenshin faces Shishio himself. Shishio's sword, like Kenshin's, is a work by master swordsmith Arai Shakku: a blade called Mugenjin (無限刃, lit. 'Unlimited Blade'); its self-sharpening serrated edge flaked away in a regular pattern as it was used and it had become soaked in the flesh and body fat of the victims he had killed over the years. As a result, he is able to execute fire-oriented techniques using the oils as fuel, which uses friction to ignite the human fats that have soaked into his sword over time. Shishio easily defeats the weakened Kenshin, but is confronted by his former allies: Sagara, Saito and Shinomori. With Kenshin recovering, the two continued their fight, during which Shishio's body started to overheat to dangerous levels. Kenshin managed to deliver an overwhelming blow using the Amakakeru Ryu No Hirameki. Shishio, however, refused to accept defeat. At one point, Yumi intervened, standing in the way of a blow from Kenshin. Taking advantage of his moment of vulnerability, Shishio runs his sword through Yumi in an attempt to hit Kenshin. Eventually, Shishio's body heat rises to the point where his blood evaporates and the fat and oils in his body ignited. The result was Shishio combusting. He is later seen in Hell with Yumi and the suicidal Hōji, commenting that they try and take it over.

=== In other media ===
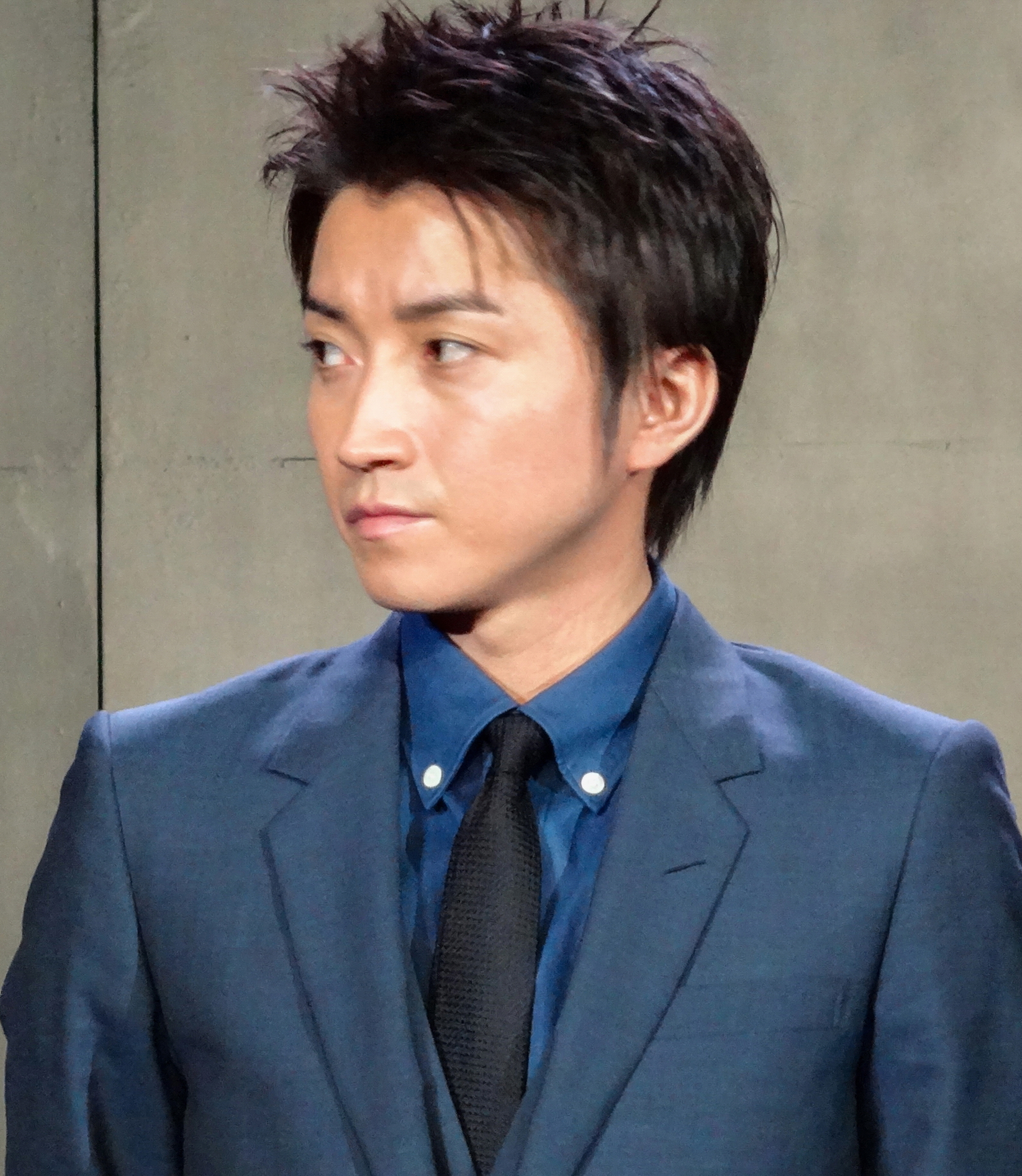
In the live-action film adaptations, Shishio is portrayed by Tatsuya Fujiwara.

Outside the main manga, Shishio starred in a two-chapter spin-off titled Rurouni Kenshin: Master of Flame (炎を統べる -るろうに剣心・裏幕-, Honō o Suberu -Rurouni Kenshin: Uramaku-; "Controlling Flame -Rurouni Kenshin: Hidden Chapter-") published in Jump SQ. in 2011, which tells how he met Yumi and formed the Juppongatana. He also makes cameos the OVAs of the series, Rurouni Kenshin: Trust & Betrayal from 1999 and Rurouni Kenshin: Reflection. He reprises his role from the Kyoto arc in the OVAs Kenshin also appears in other animated retelling of the series titled New Kyoto Arc from 2011 and 2012.

Shishio is portrayed by Tatsuya Fujiwara in the 2014 live-action films Rurouni Kenshin: Kyoto Inferno and Rurouni Kenshin: The Legend Ends. In the former one, Kenshin discovers Shishio's ship about to set sail to the capital after learning that Sōjirō has kidnapped Kaoru. The two former hitokiri have an inconclusive battle, which ends when Kaoru is thrown off board. In the latter movie, Shishio appears off the Tokyo coast in a large black iron-clad battleship, and demands that the prime minister visit him. Shishio demands that his predecessor be brought to him in exchange of his life. The negotiations end in Shishio still bitter about his cruel treatment by the government and claims would only leave the government be for the time being for Kenshin's execution. Otherwise, he intends to attack Tokyo. The execution, however, is merely staged, and Kenshin assists in defeating the men by Saito Hajime. Kenshin manages to defeat Shishio using ogi. Shishio, who has long hit his limit and whose body has become overheated, catches fire and burns to death.

Shishio is a playable character in the video games J-Stars Victory Vs and Jump Force.

Shishio also appears in flashbacks of Rurouni Kenshin Side Story: The Ex-Con Ashitaro and Rurouni Kenshin: The Hokkaido Arc, as the character Hasegawa Ashitaro was a low-level member of his forces and possesses Shishio's sword Mugenjin.

== Reception ==
Critical response to Shishio has been generally positive. In an early part of the Kyoto arc, Megan Lavey of Mania Entertainment enjoyed Shishio's display of his power on his own subordinate Hoji by grabbing his head with and displaying the burns his body possesses in order to state that how the Meiji Government made him realize that they are living in "hell" after being betrayed by them. Lavey compared Shishio with Oda Nobunaga based on their similar philospies and actions. Anime News Network acclaimed both Shishio's characterization in regards to what he represents to Kenshin's past: "a merciless killer who believes his sword to be the only justice in the land." Similarly, Chris Beveridge Mania Entertainment praised the build up the anime's Kyoto arc has had as after fighting so much build up, Shishio fights and delivers skills that would amaze viewers despite suffering major wounds in the process. Beveridge reflected that while Shishio's death caused by his old wounds rather than an attack by Kenshin, the series' protagonist was also pushed down to his limits in the story arc due to fighting Sojiro and Shinomori before Shishio. Nevertheless, the writer concluded that it was still way paid off despite assumptions that Shishio's death might initially come across as a copout. Bamboo Dong from Anime News Network referred to him as "everyone's favorite mummy man" but found disgust in how the OVA showed him having a sexual relationship despite his poor body's form as a result of suffering major burns. Dong also criticized the lack of delivery of good fight scenes despite all the build up Shishio has in order to conquer Japan through his forces. Gizmodo came to list Shishio as one of the most evil villains in anime history due to his lack of humanity as he casually kills his own lover to wound Kenshin, which made his sudden death scene memorable as he initially looked like a casual villain who only used his subordinates.

IGN listed him as the fourth best villain in anime due to his strength and philosophies despite suffering severe burns in his body. Manga News described Shishio's arc as one of the most preferred ones in the entire manga, Yukishiro Enishi's revenge arc is also popular nevertheless. Although the same site enjoyed Sojiro's fight and how it connected with Shishio's past, they said sixteenth manga's best part was Kenshin's fight against Shishio due to the build up and symbolism the two characters have. The eventual climax led further praise based on how menacing Shishio is shown in the battle against his predecessor although he questioned if Kenshin had been a superior enemy if had kept back his original killer persona.

Critics also commented on the liveaction films focused on Shishio. Jahanzeb Khan of Snap Thirty described Shishio and his minions "as a force to be reckoned with, a legitimate threat to the vulnerable Japanese society that is still struggling to transition into the Westernized values of the new government." Clarence Tsui from Hollywood Reporter noticed parallel between Shishio's actions to real life events that occurred in Japan in the liveaction. Despite praising his character, Hollywood Reporter claims that his underlings "often steal scenes". Similarly, filmedinether lamented the multiple subplots the film has, due to the major focus on Shishio as an antagonist. However, his fight scenes in his ship was praised Roxy Simmons of Eastern Kicks focused on Fujiwara's acting in particular as he "was finally able to spread his wings in this, and was fantastic as the antagonist Makoto Shishio, portraying a nuanced version of his character and vulnerabilities that made his end all the more satisfying." Lito B. Zulueta of Philippine Daily Inquirer stated that Kenshin and Shishio are "totally engaging and, in their own terms of twisted motivation and mission, credible characters."

In retrospect, F. Liu from International Journal of Education and Humanities wrote that while Shishio sticks to a bushido like Kenshin and Saito, his values are highly different from the other protagonist as his morals change after being betrayed by the Meiji and instead builds his own ideologies, swearing revenge against the Meiji while valuing the concept of how stronger people should kill the weak for their own sake. He took the deaths of his subordinates for granted while carrying out his plan to overthrow the government, believing that he, as the physically and mentally strong man, would ultimately triumph. However, Shishio's death acts like a karmic backlash due to how his plans and ambition backfire in his last fight against Kenshin as he dies in by being incinerating himself. Neverhtless, Shishio's quest never ends as even in hell he seeks to take more power.

== See also ==
- Anhidrosis
