= Yukishiro Enishi =

Fictional character from Rurouni Kenshin

- Rurouni Kenshin character
- Yukishiro Enishi on the cover of Rurouni Kenshin Kanzenban Volume 21
- First appearance: Rurouni Kenshin Act 152: Cross-Shaped Scar
- Created by: Nobuhiro Watsuki
- Portrayed by: Mackenyu (adult); Towa Araki (child)
- Voiced by: Japanese; Nozomu Sasaki; English; Brian Gaston (child); Bill Wise (adult)

In-universe information
- Title: Master of Watōjutsu
- Relatives: Yukishiro Tomoe (sister) "Geezer" (father); Himura Kenshin (ex-brother-in-law)
- Affiliations: Yaminobu (formerly); Hong Kong Mafia; Six Comrades

Yukishiro Enishi (Japanese: 雪代 縁) is a fictional character from the Rurouni Kenshin universe created by Nobuhiro Watsuki. He is the main antagonist of the Jinchū Arc, the final arc of the series. As a young boy during the pre-Meiji period in a fictional version of Japan, Enishi witnessed the (accidental) killing of his older sister, Yukishiro Tomoe, by her then-husband, Himura Kenshin. Filled with grief and anger, he swore to bring jinchū (人誅; lit. 'judgment from man') (Note: "Hitokiri" (人斬り; lit. 'manslayer') believed in tenchū (天誅; lit. "judgment from the heavens"), and therefore they were fond of the word. Enishi believes that if the heavens will not judge Kenshin, he will give Kenshin jinchū (人誅; lit. 'judgment from man'), his own brand of judgment.) to the man who killed his only sister. Ten years later, during his introduction in the series, a now-adult Enishi encounters Kenshin once again, ready to complete the jinchū. Enishi also forms "The Six Comrades", a group of six men (himself included), to assist him in his revenge against Kenshin.

Watsuki created Enishi using the concept of revenge with a level of stylish changing the more he fights the protagonist. His appearance was based on Kamijō Atsushi's character as well as one the Western Gambit of X-Men Age of Apocalypse comics. Enishi, while not featuring in the anime television series, appears in both of the original video animation (OVA) series relating to the franchise. A popular character, he has been mostly well received by manga critics and readers, though critics found him as a less menacing villain than Shishio Makoto. In the live action films Rurouni Kenshin: The Final and Rurouni Kenshin: The Beginning the character is portrayed by American–Japanese actor Mackenyu as an adult and Towa Araki as a child. Mackenyu's portrayal and fighting style was also praised by the manga.

== Conception and design ==
Nobuhiro Watsuki used "revenge" as Enishi's "model or concept." Since Watsuki created Shishio Makoto as a "manic-type" "going higher and higher and higher," the Rurouni Kenshin author wished to paint Yukishiro Enishi as a "depressive type" "falling deeper and deeper and deeper." Watsuki added that Enishi became "sort of wishy-washy" as Shishio's influence remained. Watsuki said that he could see the "obsession" within Enishi; therefore it fits the "Terminator-like" character that Watsuki intended to depict.

The author wrote that Enishi's admiration for his sister, obsession, and hatred for Kenshin reflects "Watsuki's dark side"; the author added that he has no older sister and no people that he feels a need to take revenge on. Since Shishio has aspects within Watsuki that the author considers to be positive, Enishi has Watsuki aspects that the author feels are negative.

During the series' climax, Watsuki kept listening to the song "Hurry Go Round" by the late musician hide which he felt suited the relationship between Enishi and Kenshin's darker Hitokiri Battōsai persona. Watsuki said that he "fell into bouts of self-disgust" while drawing Enishi. The author added that he felt attachment towards Enishi and that he would someday like to use Enishi in a future work.

According to the author, Enishi's design model is "a slightly deviant, white-haired, pointy-haired, handsome young man, appearing in a fancy Kamijō Atsushi-sensei-like manga." In other words, Enishi had no specific design model. Watsuki said that, since he had "inadequate art skill," he could not portray what he intended to. The author added that some people mistakenly believed that Vash the Stampede of Trigun and Basara from Macross 7 were design models for Enishi. Stating that "models are strictly models," Watsuki "converted" Enishi to his style. The creator gave Enishi glasses since Enishi appeared in the mafia, "shady Chinese clothing" since Enishi lived in China, and a "half-cape" originating from Gambit of X-Men Age of Apocalypse. Watsuki believed that this is one of his "better" designs. The author felt that Enishi was "too handsome" for a final villain and that Watsuki tired of drawing "handsome types."

In the 21st volume of the Rurouni Kenshin kanzenban edition, Watsuki again redesigned Enishi's appearance in a draft version to show how he would appear at that time. In Enishi's redesigned version, his hair was longer and spikier than it was originally. His clothes were ragged and dirty and he also wore bandages and a torn worn-out cape. Enishi's shoes were replaced with boots. His weapon of choice was a shirasaya nihontō (a katana with a wooden sheath and hilt), which he carried by placing it next to his left hip.

=== Casting ===
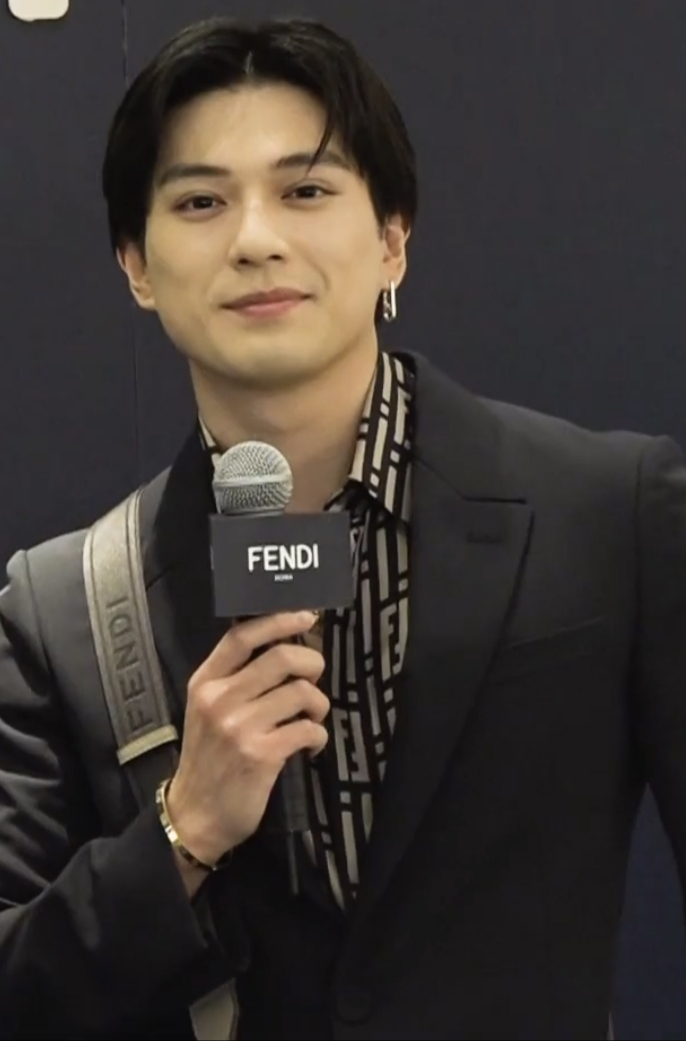
Mackenyu in 2023

In his animated appearances, Enishi was voiced by Nozomu Sasaki. During shooting of the film Rurouni Kenshin: The Final, the battle between Kenshin and Enishi had to be remade several times because Satoh got exhausted of moving four times in total. Satoh praised Arata's work as Enishi as he made the antagonist terrifying to the point the comical Kenshin acts with more tension in response to his threats which made him drop the signature sound effect "Oro". Arata also praised Satoh's works as he carried the franchise across several years in the live-action films.

Mackenyu, a fan of the Rurouni Kenshin installment, he could not hide his surprise when offered to play Enishi. Enishi is described as the series' most feared enemy. To match his physique, Mackenyu worked out, but he focused on his mentality. As an actor he really happy that he was able to be part of a set where he can fully showcase his abilities. While performing the action scenes with Tanigaki and his team, sometimes he suggested his own ideas for Enishi's movements. Other than the scenes with Kenshin, the scenes with Kaoru are a highlight. Mackenyu thinks the audience can see another side of Enishi. When they exchanged conversations, and his actions around her might show the character's depths as he revives his trauma of losing Tomoe. In regards to Rurouni Kenshin villains, he also wanted Enishi to look more menacing than the previous antagonist, Shishio Makoto.

== Appearances ==
Raised by his older sister, Tomoe, due to their mother dying. When Tomoe became engaged to Kiyosato Akira, Kiyosato is killed by Hitokiri Battōsai (Himura Kenshin). Tomoe left her brother behind to seek revenge, working with the Yaminobu to do so. When he was about ten, he discovered the location of Tomoe through the Yaminobu and appeared before her, revealing that he was the contact sent to Tomoe. Enishi gains a deep hatred for Kenshin and swore vengeance against him for mistakenly killing his sister. He disappears to China, where he was taken in by a kind and wealthy family after suffering months of hardship in the wilderness. Enishi's hair was originally black but after witnessing Kenshin's accidental killing of his sister, Tomoe, his hair turned snow white from the stress and grief of losing her. In order to reach his goal, Enishi learns the Watōjutsu, a sword style that he taught himself. It is composed of the speed and slashing style of kenjutsu and the strength and flexibility of the typical Chinese sword art used in conjunction with the Watō, a Chinese-made Japanese tachi.

In addition, Enishi believes that Tomoe wants revenge as well and constantly sees the image of his sister smiling on him. The purpose of Enishi's Jinchū is not to kill Kenshin, but to plunge him into a living hell by taking away the person he cares for the most, just like Kenshin did to him. In the attack on Kamiya Dojo, Enishi fights and defeats Kenshin shortly before delivering Jinchu. Enishi accomplishes his goal by leaving a life-size doll of Kamiya Kaoru, made by the corpse-artist Gein, to appear as though Enishi drove his sword through her heart, effectively driving Kenshin into despair. Enishi takes Kaoru back with him to an isolated island until Kenshin dies from his state of "living hell". He leaves his organization in the hands of his subordinate, Woo Heishin, a man who cares more about profits than anything. Enishi sees Tomoe again but is shocked to discover that his sister is no longer smiling at him. In a moment of madness, he attempts to strangle Kaoru, only to experience severe convulsions, which cause him to fall to the floor vomiting.

After Kenshin recovers and arrives at Enishi's Island hideout, the two fight a final duel in which Enishi believes killing Kenshin will make Tomoe smile again. Enishi's rage awakens his "Frenzied Nerves" (狂経脈, Kyōkeimyaku; "Nerves of Insanity") which causes his nerves throughout to bulge, imbuing him with greatly enhanced strength and speed while also causing him to be super sensitive to everything around him. However, Kenshin defeats Enishi by taking advantage of the Frenzied Nerves's weak point as well as using his new will to fight which paralyses him. Shortly afterwards, he and Kaoru are attacked by Heishin. Enishi protects her by punching Heishin. Heishin is badly injured, resulting Kenshin to stop Enishi, reasoning that he does not want anymore death, and by doing that Enishi would 'lose Tomoe's smile forever'. Kenshin thanks Enishi for saving Kaoru which causes him to grief Tomoe's death again. Upon Enishi's being arrested, Kaoru hands him Tomoe's diary. He manages to escape along the way, and ends up in the fallen village that Kenshin had been in during his depression, where he sees his father. His father tells Enishi that for the time being, he should simply rest.

Enishi also appears OVAs of the series, Rurouni Kenshin: Trust & Betrayal from 1999 as a child and Rurouni Kenshin: Reflection as an adult. In the latter one, Kenshin offers his life to Enishi when defeating him but he stops when Kaoru reminds him of his sister. Enishi's role in the series is also re-explored in the live-action film Rurouni Kenshin: The Final albeit with different actions and he ending in jail while reading Tomoe's diary.

== Reception ==
Critical response focused on Enishi's antagonist characterization with Manga News describing him as a psychopath due to how he wishes to torment Keshin for Tomoe's death in contrast to his initial calmer persona. Nevertheless, Manga News praised Enishi's swordskills shown in the battle against the protagonist. Anime News Network writer Zac Bertschy compared Enishi's revenge quest with the ones Millon Knives from Trigun on Vash the Stampede due to how he continuously gathers soldiers with ridiculous appearances who share hatred towards the protagonist. Nevertheless, Zac Bertschy found Enishi's arc to be less appealing than the Kyoto arc. Similarly, Manga News drew parallels to the Marvel Comics villains who team up to defeat the hero Spider-Man. In a popularity poll from the series' main site, Enishi took seventh place. In another poll involving Kenshin's rivals, Enishi took third place behind Saito Hajime and Seta Sojiro. In the book Critical Survey of Graphic Novels: Manga, Enishi's quest on his revenge on Kenshin is noted as negative, with Watsuki pointing out the time Enishi starts having hallucinations of his late sister with a sad expression on her face rather than a smile.

Carlo Santos from the same site, praised Enishi and Kenshin's final fight despite finding the ending predictably. Manga News enjoyed the final fight but felt that Enishi's strengthen senses might come across as ridiculous. While also liking their final showdown, Megan Lavey from Mania Entertainment felt that twist that happens shortly after battle is over serves to show Enishi's longlife trauma but at the same time Kenshin's compassion towards others. In regards to the animated adaption, Ridwan Khan from Animefringe found that Enishi and Shishio's antagonisms against Kenshin in the original video animations were overshadowed by Kenshin's disease due to the bigger impact it has on the narrative. Anime News Network found Enishi's fight against Kenshin in the OVAs as rushed due to the trimmed content of the revenge arc to the point the conclusion was also found different from the original version. Carl Kimlinger from the same site felt that Enishi's motivation for keeping Kamiya Kaoru alive was poorly executed as a result of how the OVAs trimmed the final arc of the manga. On the other hand, OPUSZINE felt that Enishi's reason to clash with Kenshin was a major theme in the OVAs well performed as by taking Kaoru, he makes it reasonable how Kenshin has not earned happiness due to his previous crimes, most notably Tomoe's death.

The Enishi from the live-action has been praised by Polygon as he claims that Arata "brings tangible charisma to his screen persona" and how contrasting is his chaotic personality to the caring and relaxed Kenshin, giving further depths to the rivalry as they represented the chaos from the Meiji era. Anime News Network liked the concept of Enishi's characterization due the new type of threat he brings to Kenshin not only due to his skills but whether or not the latter can bring him a solution to redeem himself for killing Tomoe during the events of Beginning. Due to the film not being able to cover the entire arc from the manga, Anime News Network lamented that Enishi's character was not properly developed. Medium compared the threat provided to the Meiji era between Enishi and Shishio but felt that the latter was given a bigger threat to the peace in contrast to Enishi's schemes as it was more personal as a result of wanting revenge towards Kenshin. Kasumi Arimura and Mackenyu were also regarded by GamerFocus as the best actors in the movie due to how strong are their presence in the main character as well as their characterization. Antonio Gallardo found Enishi too different in comparison to his manga persona due to the different tone of revenge he aims to give Kenshin with the movie Enishi only wanting him to suffer in battle rather than mentally.

In "From Manga Literature To Live-Action Film/TV: Mackenkyu'S Cross-Cultural Odyssey in Global Cinema", Ji Ding from Swansea University says Enishi's character development is reflected into the change of an era in Japan. The conflicting Bakumatsu has him suffer a traumatic event in his childhood when losing Tomoe, becoming corrupted in Shangai as "His complex character mirrors the cultural collisions of the time, embodying both the pain of personal loss and the paradoxical benefits of the new era's opportunities." The actor's mixed heritage further helps to show Enishi's struggles and thrumphs combining Western and Eastern themes.
