= Shishi (Japan) =

Japanese organization during the Edo period

Shishi (志士), literally 'men of high purpose' sometimes known as Ishin Shishi (維新志士), is a term used of Japanese political activists, active during the bakumatsu turmoil of the late Edo period and the early Meiji era. The term is usually applied to the anti-shogunate, pro-sonnō jōi (尊皇攘夷; lit. 'Revere the Emperor, Expel the Barbarian[s]') samurai primarily from the southwestern clans of Satsuma, Chōshū, and Tosa, and the eastern Mito domain.

== Growth of the movement ==
After the Harris treaty of 1868 Japanese treaty ports were opened to foreign nations. The treaty had been signed without the approval of the emperor, and the followers of sonnō jōi grew increasingly dissatisfied with the shogunate. For them, the bakufu had proven unable to guard the nation. The shogunate had not expelled the foreigners, against the wish of the emperor.

While some known shishi were scholars such as Fujita Toko, Sakuma Shōzan or Yoshida Shōin, the shishi movement is mostly known for its direct political activism. The activists were usually low ranking samurai with meager income and status, sometimes rural samurai or heads of villages. Japan at the end of the Edo era was a feudal society based on hereditary status and offices, and the career prospects of the low ranking samurai were severely restricted. In shishi movement, the outrage against the foreigners and the frustration in the lack of opportunity converged, and the result was taking up arms.

== Shishi activism ==
From 1850s to 1870s, shishi activism escalated into political violence, assassinations, and at times open war against the bakufu. The targets were the Togukawa shogunate or people associated with their support. Mark Ravina calls the shishi the ”true believers of sonnō jōi” and their activism acts of terrorism, while Marius B. Jansen described the shishi activists as ”men of sword” with inclination ”to the simplistic solutions of direct action”. The shishi attacked samurai, court officials and foreigners, and saw their violence as "heavenly punishment", with their victims often left openly in view, signs hanging around their necks.

The most famous shishi attack was the murder of one of the highest officials of bakufu, Tairō Ii Naosuke by eighteen ronin in march 1860. Seventeen of the attackers were from Mito domain, long the hotbed of sonnō jōi ideology. Other well known assassinations were that of Kobayashi Denkichi, the translator for the British, and the murder of Dutchman Henry Heusken. In July 1861, fifteen shishi attacked the British compound at Tōzenji, breaking the defences and killing and injuring several people. From mid-1862 to mid-1864 there were over 70 recorded shishi attacks. In September 1864, British merchant Charles Richardson was killed by three samurai from Satsuma domain in the Namamugi Incident.

Kawakami Gensai is recalled as the assassin of Sakuma Shōzan, a renowned pro-Western thinker of the time. Other more radical shishi, such as Miyabe Teizō, plotted large-scale attacks with little regard for public safety. Miyabe was one of the ringleaders of the plot to burn Kyoto at the height of the Gion Festival. The plan was foiled by the Shinsengumi at the Ikedaya Incident.

In Mito, shishi movement resulted in the Tengutō Rebellion from 1864 to 1865, the first armed rising against the bakufu in 200 years. While the shishi activism resulted in attacks against the shōgun's government, for Victor Koschmann the shishi did not oppose the shōgun himself. The Mito shishi, who were retainers of a relative of the shōgun, believed they were only helping him.

== The Legacy of shishi ==
The more radical shishi from Chōshū and Satsuma went on to form the core leadership of the nascent Meiji Government. Some, such as Itō Hirobumi and Yamagata Aritomo, remained prominent figures in Japanese politics and society until the early decades of the 20th century.

== See also ==
- Shinsengumi
- Tosa Kinnō-tō
