= Rurouni Kenshin (2023 TV series) =

Japanese anime series

- るろうに剣心 -明治剣客浪漫譚- Rurōni Kenshin -Meiji Kenkaku Roman Tan-
- Type: TV series
- Based on: Rurouni Kenshin
- Created by: Nobuhiro Watsuki
- Directed by: Hideyo Yamamoto (S1); Yuki Komada (S2)
- Series composition: Hideyuki Kurata
- Character designers: Terumi Nishii; Yoko Uchida (S1); Kazuo Watanabe (S2)
- Music by: Yū Takami
- No. of seasons: 2
- No. of episodes: 47

Production
- Art director: Yukihiro Saitō
- Sound director: Ryōsuke Naya
- Cinematographer: Junpei Takatsu
- Color designer: Aiko Shinohara
- CG directors: Wataru Matsunaga; Yasuaki Nakamori; Yoshimasa Yamazaki (1–14)
- Editor: Mai Hasegawa
- Animation producers: Yūichi Ōyama; Kiyoshi Kumada (1–5)
- Studio: Liden Films
- Producers: Ryu Hashimoto; Shōki Niwa; Yoshinori Takeeda
- Production companies: Rurouni Kenshin: Meiji Swordsman Romantic Story Production Committee: Aniplex; Shueisha; Fuji Television; Dentsu; Animax (S1)

Original release
- Network: Fuji TV (Noitamina)
- Release: July 7, 2023 – present

Rurouni Kenshin (Japanese: るろうに剣心 -明治剣客浪漫譚-, Hepburn: Rurōni Kenshin -Meiji Kenkaku Roman Tan- (Note: 'The Epic Tale of a Meiji Swordsman: The Wanderer, Kenshin'. Rurōni (るろうに) is a stylized spelling of rurōnin (流浪人), the word for 'wanderer'.)) is a Japanese anime television series, based on Nobuhiro Watsuki's manga series Rurouni Kenshin. It is the second anime television series adaptation after the 1996–98 series. Animated by Liden Films, its first season, directed and storyboarded by Hideyo Yamamoto, aired from July to December 2023 on Fuji TV's Noitamina programming block. A second season, subtitled Kyoto Disturbance and directed by Yuki Komada, aired from October 2024 to March 2025. A third season has been announced.

== Premise ==
In the Meiji era, Japan, Himura Kenshin is a pacifistic swordsman, wandering the country and helping people with his swordsmanship skills. Once a deadly and feared political assassin known as Hitokiri Battōsai, he has since led a path of peace, wielding a reverse-bladed sword, known as sakabatō, in a vow to never again take another life.

== Voice cast ==
Character	Japanese voice	English voice
Main characters
Himura Kenshin	Soma Saito	Howard Wang
Kamiya Kaoru	Rie Takahashi	Risa Mei
Sagara Sanosuke	Taku Yashiro	Darius Johnson
Myōjin Yahiko	Makoto Koichi	Erica Mendez
Supporting characters
Takani Megumi	Saori Ōnishi	Jennifer Sun Bell
Saitō Hajime	Satoshi Hino	Bill Butts
Shinomori Aoshi	Yuma Uchida	Ben Balmaceda
Makimachi Misao	Aya Yamane	Abby Espiritu
Okina	Shigeru Chiba	Christopher Corey Smith
Hiko Seijūrō	Yuichi Nakamura	Daniel Walton
The Ten Swords
Shishio Makoto	Makoto Furukawa	Mick Lauer
Komagata Yumi	Haruka Tomatsu	
Sadojima Hōji	Kentarō Itō	David Vincent
Seta Sōjirō	Daiki Yamashita	Edward A. Mendoza
Yūkyūzan Anji	Wataru Hatano	Chris Jai Alex
Sawagejō Chō	Nobuhiko Okamoto	Catero Colbert
Uonuma Usui	Junichi Suwabe	Jonathon Ha
Honjō Kamatari	Ayumu Murase	Meli Grant
Kariwa Henya	Ryōta Ōsaka	
Iwanbō	Takumi Yamazaki	Rich Brown
Saizuchi	Bin Shimada	
Fuji	Gakuto Kajiwara	

== Production ==
On December 19, 2021, at the Jump Festa '22 event, Liden Films was announced to be producing a new television series adaptation of the Rurouni Kenshin manga. A promotional video was presented at the Aniplex Online Fest 2022 on September 24, 2022. The series is a re-adaptation of the original manga. Hideyo Yamamoto served as director, with scripts by Hideyuki Kurata, character designs by Terumi Nishii, and Yoko Uchida, and music composed by Yū Takami. Original manga author Nobuhiro Watsuki supervised the character designs and scenario.

Yamamoto stated he was a longtime fan of the franchise, particularly impressed by the distinct artwork of the original video animations. He identified the series's appeal as its depiction of life in the Meiji era and Kenshin's role in aiding his adversaries' redemption. To differentiate this adaptation, Yamamoto sought a more serious tone, minimizing slapstick and super-deformed elements to achieve greater realism. The production incorporated 3DCG for environments and CGI for period elements like horse carriages. Fight scenes were given a distinct visual style. Character designs by Terumi Nishii, supervised by Yamamoto and Watsuki, emphasized detailed period-accurate clothing.

Supervisors Kaoru Kurosaki and Watsuki aimed to make the series accessible for a Reiwa era audience, both new and returning. Narrative revisions were made, including to the Raijuta story arc, with Kurosaki directly revising those scripts. Screenwriter Hideyuki Kurata introduced new elements to expand Sanosuke's backstory. Character artwork was updated from the manga and 1990s anime to reflect modern aesthetics, though costumes remained faithful. Casting sought to capture the dual nature of Kenshin's character, leading to the selection of Soma Saito. The adaptation intentionally reduced the protagonist's comedic interjection "Oro?" to maintain a more serious tone, though some comedic elements were retained.

Kenshin's voice actor, Soma Saito, a longtime series fan, expressed his aim to create a distinct portrayal. Kaoru's voice actress, Rie Takahashi, similarly aimed to present an appealing version of the character. Other main cast members include Makoto Koichi as Yahiko, aiming to capture his passionate spirit, and Taku Yashiro as Sanosuke, seeking to portray the character's multifaceted personality.

A second season, subtitled Kyoto Disturbance (京都動乱, Kyōto Dōran), was announced at Jump Festa '24 on December 16, 2023. Yuki Komada replaced Yamamoto as director for the second season, with Kazuo Watanabe (first season's sub-character designer and chief animation director) joining Nishii on character designs.

On March 22, 2025, Aniplex announced a third season renewal at AnimeJapan 2025.

Aniplex producer Masami Niwa expressed interest in a future adaptation of the Rurouni Kenshin: The Hokkaido Arc manga.

== Release ==
The first season of Rurouni Kenshin ran for two consecutive cours, for a total of 24 episodes aired from July 7 to December 15, 2023, on Fuji TV's Noitamina programming block. (Note: Fuji TV listed the series premiere on July 6 at 24:55, which is effectively July 7 at 12:55 a.m. JST.) For the first season, the first opening theme is "Hiten" (飛天), performed by Ayase and R-Shitei (under the name Ayase×R-Shitei), while the ending theme is "Kissaki" (切っ先; 'Edge'), performed by Reol. The second opening theme is "Rurō no Katashiro" (るろうの形代; 'Wandering Cloth'), performed by Masaki Suda and Tokyo Ska Paradise Orchestra (under the name Masaki Suda×Tokyo Ska Paradise Orchestra), while the second ending theme is "Sonzai Shōmei" (存在証明; 'Existence'), performed by Kid Phenomenon. The episodes were collected by Aniplex on eight DVDs and Blu-ray sets, released from October 25, 2023, to May 29, 2024.

The second season, subtitled Kyoto Disturbance, aired for two consecutive cours, for a total of 23 episodes, from October 4, 2024, to March 21, 2025, on Fuji TV's same programming block. (Note: Fuji TV listed the second season premiere on October 3 at 24:55, which is effectively October 4 at 12:55 a.m. JST.) For the second season, the first opening theme is "Chained" (also known as "Iranai Mono" (いらないもの; 'Unnecessary Things')), performed by Tatsuya Kitani and Natori (under the name Tatsuya Kitani×Natori), while the first ending theme is "Suikōsetten" (水光接天), performed by Nomelon Nolemon. The second opening theme is "Burn", performed by Yama and WurtS (under the name Yama×WurtS), while the second ending theme is "Tada Hitotsu" (ただひとつ; 'Just One'), performed by Zarame.

Following the second season's finale, it was announced that the series had been renewed for a third season.

=== English release ===
Aniplex of America screened the U.S. premiere for the series at the 2023 Anime Expo on July 3 in the Main Events stage of the Los Angeles Convention Center. A conversation between Aniplex producer Masami Niwa and voice actors Soma Saito and Rie Takahashi followed the screening. Crunchyroll is streaming the series outside of Asia. An English dub premiered on October 15, 2023, although neither Aniplex of America nor Crunchyroll revealed the cast. The English dub for the second season premiered on October 24, 2024.

== Episodes ==
=== Season 1 (2023) ===
The storyboarding for the entire first season was handled by Hideyo Yamamoto.

No. overall	No. in season	Title	Directed by	Written by	Chief animation direction by	Original release date
1	1	"Kenshin – Himura Battosai" (Japanese: 剣心・緋村抜刀斎)	Hideyo Yamamoto	Hideyuki Kurata	Masahiro Emoto & Kenji Matsuoka	July 7, 2023
A decade after the Bakumatsu, the wanderer Himura Battōsai is accosted in Tokyo by Kamiya Kaoru, a swordsmanship teacher who mistakes him for a murderer, though he proves his sakabatō is incapable of killing; when an impostor claiming to be Battōsai attacks and wounds Kaoru, Himura escorts her back to the Kamiya Kasshin dojo, where he learns her belief that a sword can save lives and deduces her assistant Kihee is involved with the impostor, who soon invades the dojo and is revealed as Hiruma Gohei, Kihee's brother, seeking to claim it for themselves, prompting Himura to reveal himself as the true Battōsai and defeat the interlopers with his non-lethal blade, after which Kaoru, undeterred by his past, invites him to stay, an offer he accepts while introducing his true name, Himura Kenshin.
2	2	"Tokyo Samurai – Yahiko Myojin"; Transliteration: "Tōkyō-fu Shizoku・Myōjin Yahiko" (Japanese: 東京府士族・明神弥彦)	Araki Issei	Hideyuki Kurata	Toshiko & Mamoru Nishimiya	July 14, 2023
While preparing to depart for supplies, Kenshin is robbed by a child, Myojin Yahiko, but permits the theft out of pity; this act of mercy enrages Yahiko, who throws the wallet back, leading Kenshin to advise him to retain that pride rather than steal. Shortly thereafter, Kenshin is arrested by policemen for carrying a sword, only to be intercepted by a more ruthless group that sadistically takes over the case—a situation resolved when Kaoru attempts to warn him and Kenshin effortlessly subdues all the assailants, drawing the attention of his former comrade Yamagata Aritomo, a Meiji politician who offers him privilege and position, though Kenshin declines, choosing to maintain his independent path; having witnessed Kenshin's strength and principle, Yahiko recalls his words and resolves to abandon theft, though this decision leads his former superiors to abuse him.
3	3	"Kasshin-ryu – Reborn"; Transliteration: "Kasshin-ryū・Saishidō" (Japanese: 活心流・再始動)	Nan	Hideyuki Kurata	Minoru Kanari & Takayuki Onoda	July 21, 2023
The yakuza beat Yahiko and mock his deceased parents until Kenshin arrives and intimidates the gang's leader into releasing him; upon learning that Yahiko desires strength to honor his parents' memory, Kenshin arranges for him to become a student of Kaoru's Kasshin-ryu, though the boy remains rebellious after recovering—but when two former students arrive claiming to need help against bandits, Yahiko discerns they were drunken instigators, yet Kaoru accepts responsibility regardless, earning his respect and his decision to fight beside her, prompting Kenshin to return and frighten the bandits away before banishing the disgraced students from swordsmanship, an action that leads both Kaoru and Kenshin to reconsider their rigid beliefs as they watch Yahiko solemnly clean the dojo with his wooden sword in hand.
4	4	"The Fighter for Hire – Sanosuke Sagara"; Transliteration: "Kenka no Otoko・Sagara Sanosuke" (Japanese: 喧嘩の男・相楽左之助)	Yoshitaka Makino	Hideyuki Kurata	Kazuhisa Kosuge	July 28, 2023
Kenshin, Kaoru, and Yahiko visit the Akabeko restaurant where a trio of intoxicated men cause a disturbance while discussing politicians; just as Kenshin is about to intervene, he is preempted by Sagara Sanosuke, a young mercenary who effortlessly subdues them, and after Kenshin frightens the troublemakers away with his sword, Sanosuke expresses interest in testing Kenshin's strength as a fighter-for-hire—an offer Kenshin declines—though Sanosuke is later recruited by the vengeful Hiruma brothers to assassinate him, a task he initially resists until learning of Kenshin's association with the Ishin Shishi, leading him to issue a formal challenge that Kenshin accepts upon discovering the Hirumas' involvement, resulting in a one-sided battle where Kenshin effortlessly evades every swing of Sanosuke's massive zanbatō.
5	5	"And Then, Another"; Transliteration: "Soshite Nakama ga Mata Ichi-nin" (Japanese: そして仲間がまた一人)	Akira Odama	Hideyuki Kurata	Masaru Kitao	August 4, 2023
Employing his superior skill, Kenshin easily overpowers Sanosuke, though the mercenary's enduring rage toward the Ishin Shishi—who executed his beloved captain Sagara Sōzō of the Sekihōtai—drives him to continue fighting; seizing the opportunity, Kihee fires at Kenshin, who deflects the bullet with his tsuba, prompting Hiruma Gohei to attempt kidnapping Kaoru and Yahiko, only to be thwarted by Sanosuke wielding his zanbatō, after which Kenshin and Sanosuke clash once more, resulting in Kenshin's sakabatō cleaving Sanosuke's blade and ending the battle, with Sanosuke finally conceding upon recognizing that Kenshin's values distinguish him from the Ishin Shishi he despises; the next day, a recovering Sanosuke returns to the Akabeko restaurant, dispersing a group of drunks before formally befriending Kenshin and thanking him for reaffirming his convictions.
6	6	"Kurogasa" (Japanese: 黒笠)	Keisuke Nishijima	Hideyuki Kurata	Atsuko Yamazaki	August 11, 2023
A series of assassinations targeting politicians compels the police to enlist Kenshin and Sanosuke as bodyguards for the next probable victim; Kenshin soon suspects the assailant is a former rival due to the supernatural technique employed, a theory confirmed at midnight when the killer—Jin-e, an ex-Shinsengumi and fellow hitokiri—appears and swiftly paralyzes Sanosuke and the other guards using his oppressive chi, though Kenshin resists the technique, intriguing Jin-e, who escapes after declaring him his new target; despite Kenshin's insistence on facing this enemy alone, Kaoru extracts a promise from him not to depart until returning her bow, a vow rendered void when Jin-e kidnaps her, provoking Kenshin's fury.
7	7	"The Two Hitokiri"; Transliteration: "Hitokiri Futari" (Japanese: 人斬りふたり)	Yoshitaka Makino	Hideyuki Kurata	Atsuko Yamazaki & Masahiro Emoto	August 18, 2023
Pursuing Jin-e's directive, Kenshin locates the hideout where Kaoru is held captive but is swiftly overpowered by his adversary, who taunts that the Hitokiri Battōsai of the Bakumatsu was far more lethal; disillusioned, Jin-e paralyzes Kaoru and condemns her to a gradual death, a cruelty that triggers Kenshin's reversion to his former persona, leading him to unleash his lethal battōjutsu with overwhelming force—yet as he prepares to deliver the killing blow, Kaoru breaks free from her paralysis through sheer will, recalling Kenshin's vow of non-violence and pleading with him to stop, prompting Jin-e to take his own life while mocking Kenshin with his final breath; upon returning to the dojo, the two express mutual gratitude for averting a return to murder, though Kaoru is visibly dismayed to find her bow stained with blood.
8	8	"Beauty on the Run"; Transliteration: "Tōsō Reijo" (Japanese: 逃走麗女)	Kayona Yamada	Hideyuki Kurata	Hironari Asao	August 25, 2023
During a gambling session with friends and Kenshin, Sanosuke is stunned to learn one of their companions has died from opium addiction; they are soon approached by a fleeing Takani Megumi, pursued by two henchmen and the assassin Beshimi, whom they defeat, though Megumi is discovered to be carrying opium herself and conceals it from Kaoru, leading to the entire group's expulsion from the dojo. After Sanosuke's friend reveals the executed pursuers were agents of Takeda Kanryū—the mastermind importing opium into Tokyo—Kenshin is confronted by Kanryū's bodyguard, Aoshi Shinomori, leader of the Oniwaban; upon returning to the dojo, Kenshin presses Megumi for details, which she withholds until after apologizing to Kaoru for her deception, an moment interrupted by Hyottoko, a hulking Oniwaban operative, launching an assault on the dojo.
9	9	"The Oniwabanshu Strike"; Transliteration: "Oniwaban Kyōshū" (Japanese: 御庭番強襲)	Shōhei Yamanaka	Hideyuki Kurata	Kazuo Watanabe & Toshimitsu Kobayashi	September 1, 2023
Hyottoko attempts to immolate Kenshin and Sanosuke but is swiftly subdued, while a concealed Beshimi fires a poisoned dart at Megumi only for Yahiko to intercept it; as the toxin overwhelms the boy, Kenshin moves to strike but is halted by the sudden appearance of Hannya, another Oniwaban agent, whom he wounds before the assailants retreat, leaving Megumi to synthesize an antidote that saves Yahiko—prompting her revelation that she is the last of the Takani clan, forced as a child into Western medicine before losing her family in Aizu and being coerced by Kanryū into producing opium; acknowledging her remorse, Kenshin invites her to remain at the dojo, an offer Kaoru supports, while a wounded Hannya reports to Aoshi, igniting his commander's interest in Kenshin, and in a post-credits scene, Kanryū is seen delighting over a mysterious item aboard a Western ship.
10	10	"A Reason to Act"; Transliteration: "Ugoku Wake" (Japanese: 動く理由)	Nan	Hideyuki Kurata	Kazuhisa Kosuge	September 8, 2023
Though Kenshin, Kaoru, and Yahiko welcome Megumi, Sanosuke remains distrustful due to her opium production; Hannya later corners her alone at the dojo and coerces her into meeting Kanryū, where her attempted assassination fails as Aoshi intervenes and takes her captive, prompting Kenshin to rally Sanosuke and Yahiko for a rescue mission that breaches Kanryū's compound and overpowers his private army until they reach the mansion, where Kanryū futilely offers the title of bodyguard to Hitokiri Battōsai; inside, Aoshi returns Megumi's knife and presents her with a grim choice: a swift death by her own hand or prolonged torture, a decision interrupted as Kenshin's group forces entry and confronts Hannya.
11	11	"Savage Han'nya – Honorable Shikijo"; Transliteration: "Sōretsu no Hannya・Sōi no Shikijō" (Japanese: 壮烈の般若・創痍の式尉)	Yoshitaka Makino	Hideyuki Kurata	Toshimitsu Kobayashi	September 15, 2023
Kenshin initially struggles against Hannya's elusive attacks but adopts a defensive stance with his sakabatō to discern that intricate tattoos create the illusion of extending limbs, enabling a decisive strike that shatters Hannya's mask and reveals a face disfigured by espionage; after his victory, the group ascends to the next floor where the colossal Shikijo blocks their path, leading Sanosuke to insist on facing him alone while Kenshin and Yahiko proceed toward Megumi—though Shikijo, impressed by Sanosuke's resilience, offers him a place within the Oniwaban, Sanosuke rejects it in favor of Kenshin's ideals and emerges victorious, albeit collapsing from exhaustion shortly after, as elsewhere Kenshin finally confronts Aoshi, and the two warriors stand poised for battle.
12	12	"Okashira – Aoshi Shinomori"; Transliteration: "O-kashira Shinomori Aoshi" (Japanese: 御頭・四之森蒼紫)	Yoshifumi Sueda	Hideyuki Kurata	Terumi Nishii, Atsuko Yamazaki & Yoshinori Deno	September 22, 2023
Employing his expert kenpō and dual kodachi, Aoshi swiftly dominates Kenshin, who adapts by gripping the blade of his sakabatō to effectively shorten its range and land a glancing blow; enraged, Aoshi unleashes his ultimate technique, the Kaiten Kenbu, yet Kenshin anticipates and counters it, leaving both combatants collapsed—with Aoshi briefly unconscious and Kenshin consciously sparing his life—before the defeated Oniwaban leader explains his desire to restore his group's honor, a goal only Kanryū had exploited, a moment shattered when Kanryū himself appears and opens fire with a Gatling gun, crippling Aoshi's legs until the arrival of Sanosuke, Hannya, and the gravely wounded Shikijo, who uses his own body as a shield against the barrage to protect his commander.
13	13	"Battle's End"; Transliteration: "Shitō no Hate" (Japanese: 死闘の果て)	Tetsuaki Mita	Hideyuki Kurata	Masahiro Emoto	September 29, 2023
Though Shikijo, Hyottoko, Beshimi, and Hannya perish shielding Aoshi, their sacrifice enables Kenshin to subdue Kanryū; when the authorities arrive to arrest Megumi for her role in the opium operation, Kenshin intervenes, proclaiming her an unwilling pawn in Kanryū's scheme and intimidating the captured magnate into silent compliance, leading the police to depart with him alone—allowing Kenshin, Sanosuke, and Yahiko to persuade Megumi to seek redemption through healing, a path affirmed when a local doctor offers her residence at his clinic, while a traumatized Aoshi escapes with the severed heads of his comrades, vowing to honor their memory by proving the Oniwaban's invincibility in a future confrontation with Kenshin.
14	14	"Yahiko's Battle"; Transliteration: "Yahiko no Tatakai" (Japanese: 弥彦の戦い)	Shôhei Yamanaka	Hideyuki Kurata	Toshimitsu Kobayashi	October 6, 2023
Noticing Yahiko's frequent absences, Kenshin, Kaoru, and Sanosuke discover him working at the Akabeko restaurant alongside a young girl named Tsubame, who is being coerced by a gang of thieves into providing a replicated key for a planned robbery; though Yahiko attempts to intervene, he is overpowered, and despite Kaoru's and Sanosuke's urge to assist directly, Kenshin insists the boy must resolve the situation independently, leading Yahiko to seek Kenshin's advice on battling multiple opponents—a lesson complemented by Kaoru's reinforcement of Kamiya Kasshin-ryū's principles—before confronting the thieves that night, where he retrieves the key and systematically defeats several assailants until Kenshin and Sanosuke disperse the remainder, allowing Yahiko to triumph over the gang's leader after Tsubame pleads for his aid, and though he later confesses to Sanosuke that his true goal was to earn enough for a sakabatō like Kenshin's—a dream beyond his financial reach—he expresses pride in his growth as a swordsman.
15	15	"That Man – Raijuta"; Transliteration: "Sono Otoko Raijūta" (Japanese: その男・雷十太)	Yû Harima	Kaoru Kurosaki	Isoroku Koga & Atsuko Yamazaki	October 13, 2023
While visiting the Maekawa dojo with Kaoru and Yahiko, Kenshin observes kendo training until the arrival of Raijuta Isurugi, who challenges and nearly kills the master with a bamboo sword—a display halted by Kenshin, who then duels Raijuta and discerns his technique of imbuing the bamboo with lethal force, evading each strike until Raijuta withdraws, later sending an invitation for another meeting where he reveals his ambition to revive swordsmanship as a deadly art, expressing contempt for the modern prevalence of non-lethal kendo; Kenshin firmly rejects this vision, refusing to endorse a return to lethal combat, prompting Raijuta to draw his katana in response.
16	16	"The Ideal Man"; Transliteration: "Risō no Otoko" (Japanese: 理想の男)	Daiki Handa	Kaoru Kurosaki	Kei Saotomé & Masaru Kitao	October 20, 2023
Raijuta is swiftly defeated by Kenshin yet vows vengeance, while his student Yutaro challenges Yahiko in a poorly timed early-morning duel that exposes his lack of skill; pitying his neglected training, Kaoru instructs him, and Yutaro confides his wish to surpass his merchant father by becoming a samurai, leading Raijuta to permit his stay at the Kamiya dojo where he flourishes—though he remains convinced Raijuta holds his true potential, recalling how the swordsman supposedly saved him and his father from bandits, a story revealed as a fabrication when Raijuta ambushes Kenshin at the site and accidentally wounds Yutaro, admitting the attack was staged to secure the father's wealth; Kenshin delays their duel to rush Yutaro to a hospital, where he learns the injury will permanently end the boy's swordsmanship aspirations.
17	17	"Settling the Score"; Transliteration: "Ketchaku" (Japanese: 決着)	Rion Kujo	Kaoru Kurosaki	Toshimitsu Kobayashi & Yoshinori Deno	October 27, 2023
In their duel, Kenshin discerns that Raijuta generates vacuum-like slashes by displacing air with his blade and deduces from his boasts that, despite his skill, he has never taken a life; though wounded by several cuts, Kenshin disarms and defeats him using his handle and scabbard, but a humiliated Raijuta seizes Yahiko and threatens to kill him until his bluff is called, leading to his retreat. Later, Yutaro's father informs Kenshin of their planned move to Germany, hoping his son will abandon swordsmanship, though Yutaro sinks into despair over his permanent injury until Yahiko provokes him into blocking a bamboo strike with his cane, revealing his reflexes remain intact. In a post-credits scene, Raijuta confronts two civilians intending to prove his capacity for murder but ultimately breaks down, unable to commit the act.
18	18	"Sanosuke & Nishiki Paintings"; Transliteration: "Sanosuke to Nishiki-e" (Japanese: 左之助と錦絵)	Yostaka Nagaoka	Hideyuki Kurata	Atsuko Yamazaki & Hironari Asao	November 3, 2023
While examining a series of nishiki-e paintings, Sanosuke encounters one depicting his former captain, Sagara Sōzō, and learns it was created by Tsunan Tsukioka—an old comrade from the Sekihōtai and Sagara's protégé; upon reuniting, Sanosuke discovers Tsukioka remains devoted to the Sekihōtai's cause a decade after its dissolution and intends to deploy hidden incendiary bombs against Tokyo to destroy the Meiji government, offering Sanosuke a chance to join him. The next day, Sanosuke hosts a lavish party for the entire town where Tsukioka meets Kenshin and grows suspicious upon learning of his past with the Ishin Shishi; as the gathering concludes and guests depart or succumb to sleep, Tsukioka and Sanosuke proceed toward Tokyo, unaware that Kenshin remains alert and conscious of their movements.
19	19	"Tsunan & Nishiki Paintings"; Transliteration: "Tsunan to Nishiki-e" (Japanese: 津南と錦絵)	Misato Takada & Tetsuaki Mita	Hideyuki Kurata	Kei Saotomé & Masaru Kitao	November 10, 2023
Kenshin intercepts Sanosuke and Tsukioka in Tokyo, and after multiple failed attempts to overcome the former Ishin Shishi, Sanosuke knocks out his comrade and entrusts all the incendiary bombs to Kenshin for disposal; enraged and feeling betrayed, Tsukioka attempts suicide, but Sanosuke intervenes and, through a brief struggle, persuades him that the Meiji era is filled with people striving to live honorably—unlike their fallen Sekihōtai brethren—and that self-destruction would only waste that potential, leading Tsukioka to abandon his vengeful path and instead found a newspaper to critique the government constructively. In a post-credits scene, former Ishin Shishi statesman Ōkubo Toshimichi reviews the incident but dismisses the involvement of Shishio Makoto due to the absence of casualties.
20	20	"Meiji Swordsman Romantic Story: Act Zero"; Transliteration: "Meiji Kenkaku Roman Tan Dai Rei-maku" (Japanese: 明治剣客浪漫譚 第零幕)	Keiji Kawakubo	Kaoru Kurosaki	Toshimitsu Kobayashi & Yoshinori Deno	November 17, 2023
21	21	"Meiji Swordsman Romantic Story: Act Zero"; Transliteration: "Meiji Kenkaku Roman Tan Dai Rei-maku" (Japanese: 明治剣客浪漫譚 第零幕)	Shôhei Yamanaka	Kaoru Kurosaki	Atsuko Yamazaki & Kazuhisa Kosuge	November 24, 2023
At his friends' urging, Kenshin recounts a past journey to Yokohama where he encountered a rickshaw puller named Dankichi; as they spoke, a woman collapsed nearby, and Dankichi's passenger—a foreigner introduced as Dr. Elder—rushed to aid her, drawing the ire of Deian Ishizu, a avaricious doctor seeking to monopolize Western medicine who orders his men to kill the woman, though Kenshin thwarts them while Dankichi escorts her to safety. Grateful, Dr. Elder invites them for tea, where Kenshin notices a man bearing a Western-style sword; later, while staying at a hotel, he inadvertently discovers Dr. Elder is a woman, and soon after, Ishizu hires a foreign assassin named Espiral—eager to battle Kenshin—to eliminate her. Espiral, armed with a spiral-bladed sabre, lures Dankichi and Dr. Elder into a trap and attacks them, demanding Kenshin's location; Kenshin soon arrives, having identified the earlier message as a ruse, and soundly defeats Espiral despite the assassin's rapid thrusts and ultimate technique. Refusing to kill his opponent, Kenshin demonstrates that his sakabatō symbolizes his renunciation of lethal violence, a principle that moves Espiral to intervene when Ishizu attempts to release a smallpox vial against them. Later, Espiral abandons his ambition to defeat Kenshin and instead becomes Dr. Elder's bodyguard, inspired to adopt a reversed-edge sabre of his own; before departing for the United States, Dr. Elder reveals her true identity to the public. To his friends' astonishment, Kenshin discloses that this event occurred merely five days before he met Kaoru.
22	22	"Resurrection of the Wolf"; Transliteration: "Yomigaeru Ōkami" (Japanese: 蘇る狼)	Tetsuya Endo	Hideyuki Kurata	Kei Saotomé, Hironari Asao & Kazuhisa Kosuge	December 1, 2023
Noticing Kenshin's subdued demeanor, his friends learn he is reflecting on his history with the Shinsengumi, the formidable opposing force during the Bakumatsu; their discussion is interrupted when a stranger arrives at the Kamiya Dojo and swiftly defeats Sanosuke—revealed to be Saitō Hajime, a former Shinsengumi captain now allied with Senate Secretary Shibumi, the architect behind Jin-e's political assassinations. As Megumi tends to Sanosuke, Kenshin recognizes Saitō's involvement but doubts his ability to overcome him; meanwhile, Saitō collaborates with Shibumi's mercenary, Akamatsu Arundo, and lures Kenshin to an isolated field where Akamatsu ensnares him in chains after feigning vulnerability, while elsewhere, Saitō—in disguise—locates Yahiko.
23	23	"The Wolf's Fang"; Transliteration: "Kiba o Muku Ōkami" (Japanese: 牙を剥く狼)	Hideyo Yamamoto	Hideyuki Kurata	Toshimitsu Kobayashi	December 8, 2023
Disguised as a policeman, Saitō enters the dojo and warns Kaoru and Yahiko that Kenshin is targeted, gaining their trust to wait with them; meanwhile, Akamatsu boasts to the ensnared Kenshin about the specific threat against him, only for Kenshin to break free and defeat him. On his return, Kaoru informs him of the "policeman" sent for his protection, leading to Kenshin exposing Saitō's true identity and igniting a brutal duel where Kenshin sustains severe injuries before reverting to his Hitokiri Battōsai persona, fighting with lethal ferocity as Sanosuke observes that only someone from their war could halt this mutual slaughter; as both lose their weapons and poised for a final strike, the clash is abruptly interrupted by the arrival of Ōkubo.
24	24	"Meiji 11, May 14th" Transliteration: "Meiji Jūichinen Gogatsu Jūyokka" (Japanese: 明治十一年五月十四日)	Yoshitaka Makino	Hideyuki Kurata	Atsuko Yamazaki, Masahiro Emoto & Kei Saotomé	December 15, 2023
Ōkubo informs Kenshin that his presence is urgently required in Kyoto to confront Makoto Shishio, a former Ishin Shishi assassin of exceptional skill and ambition who was believed executed for fear he would overthrow the nascent Meiji government but has resurfaced alive; granted a week to decide, Kenshin's deliberation is cut short when Ōkubo is assassinated by one of Shishio's associates, whom Kenshin confronts at the scene only to be taunted before the killer vanishes into the crowd. Recognizing that Ōkubo's death will ignite the civil unrest Shishio seeks to exploit, Kenshin bids farewell to Kaoru, explaining that while the Hitokiri Battōsai persona remains a part of him and emerges only when she or others are imperiled, he must depart to prevent greater bloodshed, embracing her gratefully before beginning his journey.

=== Season 2 (2024–25) ===
No. overall	No. in season	Title	Directed by	Written by	Chief animation direction by	Original release date
25	1	"To Kyoto"; Transliteration: "Kyōto e" (Japanese: 京都へ)	Directed by : Yoshitaka Makino; Storyboarded by : Yuki Komada	Hideyuki Kurata	Toshimitsu Kobayashi & Masahiro Emoto	October 4, 2024
Kenshin journeys to Kyoto alone, fearing further casualties from Shishio's forces and rejecting Saitō's offer of alliance; in Tokyo, an enraged Sanosuke attempts to follow but is halted by Saitō, who derides his weakness as a liability, prompting Sanosuke to challenge him—a fight Saitō easily wins yet concedes to Sanosuke's resolve, permitting him to travel independently. Meanwhile, Megumi finds Kaoru despondent over Kenshin's absence and entrusts her with medicine for him while urging her to uphold the dojo, reminding her others share her sorrow; Yahiko then persuades Kaoru to pursue Kenshin, arguing she alone holds the influence to ensure his return, a truth underscored by his singular farewell to her.
26	2	"On the East Sea Road"; Transliteration: "Meiji Tōkaidō-chū" (Japanese: 明治東海道中)	Directed by : Toshiyuki Anzai & Shinsuke Terasawa; Storyboarded by : Shinji Itadaki	Hideyuki Kurata	Toshimitsu Kobayashi & Kenji Matsuoka	October 11, 2024
Megumi encounters Aoshi at the dojo seeking Kenshin; he threatens her for information until Saitō intervenes, revealing Shishio's resurgence and prompting Aoshi to depart and await Kenshin's return, though he is soon approached by Shishio's envoys whom he kills for desecrating his comrades' graves before being confronted by Ōkubo's assassin, Seta Sōjirō, who invites him to Kyoto. During his travels, Kenshin observes Makimachi Misao skirmishing with yakuza bandits who stole a town's funds, which she reclaims and pilfers herself; she then attempts to mug Kenshin but finds him penniless, and as he urges her to abandon crime, more yakuza arrive—a confrontation Kenshin avoids by slicing the bridge beneath them, sending all into the river. Grateful, Misao explains she searches for her childhood guardians, Aoshi and the Oniwaban, startling Kenshin.
27	3	"The Abandoned Village"; Transliteration: "Misuterareta Mura" (Japanese: ⾒捨てられた村)	Directed by : Koji Aritomi; Storyboarded by : Tomoya Takashima & Yuki Komada	Hideyuki Kurata	Kei Saotomé & Hironari Asao	October 18, 2024
Kenshin withholds the fate of the Oniwaban from Misao, provoking her fury, but he relents and allows her to accompany him to Kyoto after witnessing her determination to reunite with Aoshi. Meanwhile, as Sanosuke, Yahiko, and Kaoru journey separately toward Kyoto, Kenshin encounters a dying man and an unconscious boy who pleads for him to save their village, Shingetsu, from Shishio's forces; after the man perishes, the boy, Eiji, asserts the Meiji government abandoned them, and Kenshin resolves to intervene upon learning of Senkaku's corruption. Arriving in Shingetsu, they discover two bloodied bodies hanged—Eiji's parents—prompting the boy's agonized screams as Senkaku's men attack Kenshin, though Saitō abruptly appears to rescue Misao and Eiji from an additional assassin.
28	4	"Portrait of the Ambitious"; Transliteration: "Yashinka no Shōzō" (Japanese: 野心家の肖像)	Directed by : Toshiyuki Anzai; Storyboarded by : Yuki Komada	Hideyuki Kurata	Toshimitsu Kobayashi & Kazuhisa Kosuge	October 25, 2024
Saitō identifies Eiji's deceased brother as a policeman previously dispatched to investigate Shingetsu, murdered by Senkaku, one of Shishio's followers; after respectfully cutting down Eiji's parents for burial, Kenshin and Saitō advance to confront Shishio, instructing Misao to guard Eiji—though both children later defy them and follow. Guided by Sōjirō into Shishio's stronghold, they listen as Shishio outlines his plan to dominate Japan via villages like Shingetsu and dismantle the Meiji government, then orders Senkaku to test Kenshin's abilities; Kenshin strategically exhausts Senkaku's colossal physique by evading at high speed until his knee fails, and when Shishio threatens Senkaku for his incompetence, the enraged subordinate launches a futile attack that Kenshin ends with his Hiten Mitsurugi-ryū, before directly challenging Shishio.
29	5	"To Kyoto, Once More"; Transliteration: "Futatabi Kyōto e" (Japanese: 再び京都へ)	Directed by : Ryuta Yamamoto; Storyboarded by : Yuki Komada	Hideyuki Kurata	Kei Saotomé, Hironari Asao & Masahiro Emoto	November 1, 2024
Disappointed by Kenshin's non-lethal approach, Shishio declines to fight him personally, asserting that pacifism guarantees his defeat, and instead permits Sōjirō to engage him while bestowing a Nagasone Kotetsu katana for the duel. Recognizing Sōjirō as a uniquely unpredictable foe devoid of discernible chi, Kenshin clashes with him in a high-speed battōjutsu exchange that shatters both his sakabatō and Sōjirō's blade, prompting Sōjirō's retreat to Shishio, who commands him to assemble the "Ten Swords" to reawaken Kenshin's darker self. Saitō prevents Eiji from executing the unconscious Senkaku, while Kenshin and Misao console the orphan; with the village secured, Saitō arranges for his wife to care for Eiji, and Kenshin and Misao resume their journey to Kyoto. In a post-credits scene, Sanosuke remains lost en route to Kyoto.
30	6	"Encounter in the Forest"; Transliteration: "Mori no Deai" (Japanese: 森の出会い)	Yasuaki Fujii	Hideyuki Kurata	Toshimitsu Kobayashi	November 8, 2024
While lost in a forest, Sanosuke encounters a fallen monk, Yukyuzan Anji, who trains relentlessly under a vow to protect others and demonstrates the Futae no Kiwami, a technique that negates target resistance; Sanosuke pleads to learn it, accepting the condition that failure means death, and though he initially injures his hand without progress, he refuses to quit. On the sixth night, a vision of Sagara Sōzō questions his resolve, and Sanosuke affirms his desire to strengthen himself to safeguard his friends; by the final day, he masters the technique, shattering a massive boulder, and Anji—astonished—guides him to Kyoto while revealing his own name, only for Sōjirō to appear and expose Anji as a member of Shishio's Ten Swords.
31	7	"Arrival in Kyoto"; Transliteration: "Kyōto Tōchaku" (Japanese: 京都到着)	Yoshitaka Makino	Kaoru Kurosaki	Touma Kanbara, Masahiro Emoto & Toshimitsu Kobayashi	November 15, 2024
Upon reaching Kyoto, Kenshin and Misao are welcomed at the Aoiya inn by former Oniwaban members, including Kashiwazaki "Okina" Nenji, who immediately identifies Kenshin as Hitokiri Battōsai; while Misao rests, Kenshin reveals the tragic fate of Aoshi's group, though Okina already acknowledges Shishio's threat and accepts Kenshin as an ally. Elsewhere, Yahiko and Kaoru arrive at the Shirobeko restaurant and meet Sae, the twin sister of Tokyo's Tae, while Yahiko is stunned to spot Aoshi roaming the city. Utilizing the Oniwaban's intelligence network, Kenshin and Okina seek out the swordsmith Arai Shakku to commission a new blade, only to encounter his pacifist son, Seiku, leading Kenshin to withdraw his request out of respect. As they depart, two of Shishio's spies observe Kenshin's presence in Kyoto.
32	8	"Chō of the Ten Swords"; Transliteration: "Juppongatana: Chō" (Japanese: ⼗本⼑・張)	Directed by : Koji Aritomi; Storyboarded by : Takashi Kawasaki	Kaoru Kurosaki	Kei Saotomé & Hironari Asao	November 22, 2024
Shishio consults his subordinate Hōji regarding their strategy, facing disagreement over deploying the Ten Swords against Kenshin; meanwhile, the Ten Swords member Chō learns of Kenshin's failed attempt to acquire a new sword from Seiku and targets his father's final masterpiece, threatening Seiku and his wife Azusa to disclose its location at a local temple and taking their son Iori hostage. Misao, initially sent to persuade Seiku, discovers the abduction and alerts Kenshin via Okina's network; Kenshin races to the temple and confronts Chō, offering to surrender the katana for Iori's release, but Chō reneges and attempts to test the blade on the child, provoking a battle where Kenshin shatters Chō's array of katanas and strikes his abdomen with his scabbard—only for Chō to remain standing, protected by an armored katana concealed beneath his robes.
33	9	"Drawing of the Forbidden"; Transliteration: "Kinki no Battō" (Japanese: 禁忌の抜刀)	Directed by : Tetsuya Endo; Storyboarded by : Yoshiaki Okumura & Yuki Komada	Hideyuki Kurata	Toshimitsu Kobayashi & Kazuhisa Kosuge	November 29, 2024
Employing his whip-like Hakujin no Tachi, Cho overwhelms the injured Kenshin, who struggles to evade the weapon's unpredictable strikes, and taunts him for clinging to pacifism, though this confrontation ultimately strengthens Kenshin's resolve and persuades Seiku to provide him with his father's katana; while Seiku retrieves the weapon, Kenshin momentarily fells Cho with an elbow strike, but Cho then feigns an attack on Iori, successfully provoking Kenshin's rage and triggering his reversion into the Hitokiri Battosai persona, leading Kenshin to draw the katana and employ his Hiten Mitsurugi Ryu to defeat Cho, though all are subsequently stunned to discover the katana is in fact another sakabatō that enables Kenshin to uphold his vow, and as authorities take Cho away, Seiku and Kenshin reflect on a message from the swordsmith Shakku on the handle which reveals his wish to aid Kenshin in ushering in a peaceful era by forging the reverse-blade sword to support his oath to never kill again.
34	10	"Sakabato First Attack"; Transliteration: "sakabatō Shōgeki" (Japanese: 逆刃刀 初撃)	Directed by : Shunji Yoshida; Storyboarded by : Yuki Komada	Kaoru Kurosaki	Toshimitsu Kobayashi, Masahiro Emoto, Touma Kanbara & Ryo Kobayashi	December 6, 2024
In the past, after being discovered weakened by the couple Giichi and Satsuki, Kenshin learns the former detective retired due to conflicts with the Goyoto—mercenaries of the Meiji Restoration; when these soldiers arrive hunting veterans of the Battle of Ueno and seize Giichi despite his surrender, Kenshin intervenes, reluctantly drawing his new katana only to discover it is a sakabatō, which he uses to non-lethally defeat the Goyoto and admonish them to honor their fallen comrades, and after departing the couple the next day to begin his life as a ronin, he humbly accepts this very sakabatō from the Arai family in the present.
35	11	"Seijuro Hiko"; Transliteration: "Hiko Seijūrō" (Japanese: 比古清十郎)	Directed by : Ryuta Yamamoto; Storyboarded by : Tomoya Takashima & Yuki Komada	Hideyuki Kurata	Masahiro Emoto, Hironari Asao, Toshimitsu Kobayashi & Kei Saotomé	December 13, 2024
Realizing he must continue his path alone, Kenshin departs the Aoiya inn, frustrating Misao, who subsequently meets Kaoru and Yahiko at the Shirobeko; meanwhile, Kenshin enlists Okina's aid to locate his former master, Hiko Seijuro, whom he reunites with in the woods and from whom he requests instruction in the final technique of the Hiten Mitsurugi Ryu to defeat Shishio, a request Seijuro refuses while chastising Kenshin for his past abandonment of the style's mastery—which led to his life as an Ishin Shishi and Shishio's rise—and explaining that their school was founded to protect people without allegiance to any group, a conversation overheard by Kaoru, Misao, and Yahiko upon their arrival, leading the latter two to burst inside just as Kenshin sees Kaoru among them.
36	12	"Meeting of the Warlords"; Transliteration: "Shura no Kaigō" (Japanese: 修羅の会合)	Directed by : Tomo Ōkubo; Storyboarded by : Shinji Itadaki	Hideyuki Kurata	Toshimitsu Kobayashi	December 20, 2024
After Kaoru informs Hiko of Kenshin's noble actions since the beginning of the Meiji era, Hiko deems his student worthy of protecting society from Shishio's forces and agrees to teach him the strongest technique of the Hiten Mitsurugi Ryu; as Kenshin and Hiko depart for training, Yahiko recalls that Aoshi has also reached Kyoto, much to Misao's surprise, and in gratitude for her help in locating Kenshin, Kaoru shares all she knows about Aoshi with Misao—meanwhile, Okina is visited by Aoshi himself, who requests Kenshin's location but is denied this information, and after being pursued by Sojiro and the rest of the Ten Swords, Aoshi is taken to Shishio's hideout where, despite his initial refusal to join Shishio's forces, he is convinced to become an ally in exchange for Kenshin's location, agreeing to betray the remaining Oniwaban.
37	13	"Aoshi vs. Okina"; Transliteration: "Aoshi tai Okina" (Japanese: 蒼紫対翁)	Directed by : Yūki Ukai; Storyboarded by : Shinji Itadaki & Yuki Komada	Hideyuki Kurata	Toshimitsu Kobayashi	January 10, 2025
While Hiko tests Kenshin's deteriorated swordsmanship, Hoshi sends assassins to eliminate the former Oniwaban, all of whom are effortlessly defeated by Okina, though one uses his final strength to send a message to Shishio; this prompts Aoshi to confront Okina directly to obtain Kenshin's location, leading to a duel between the two former Oniwaban as a terrified Misao pursues them, culminating in Aoshi employing the ogi of his Kodachi Nitō Ryu, the Kaiten Kenbu Rokuren, to decisively strike Okina—whose body suffers catastrophic blood loss—and as a distraught Misao arrives too late, a stoic Aoshi commands her never to follow him again before departing.
38	14	"Misao's Decision"; Transliteration: "Misao no Ketsui" (Japanese: 操の決意)	Directed by : Takashi Ueno; Storyboarded by : Shinji Itadaki	Hideyuki Kurata	Masahiro Emoto, Hironari Asao & Kei Saotomé	January 17, 2025
Following Okina's defeat, Aoshi briefly confronts his former allies about Kenshin's location but returns to Shishio's headquarters after an encounter with Yahiko and Kaoru; in the aftermath, Megumi treats Okina, who remains comatose, and Misao—defying his last will for her to live as a normal girl—vows to revive the Oniwaban to defeat Shishio, even if Aoshi is an enemy. Meanwhile, Saitō locates the imprisoned Sanosuke but ignores his demands for a rematch, instead interrogating Chō about Shishio's operations and a Ten Swords member capable of killing 50 men in Kobe; after Sanosuke intimidates Chō, he identifies Sōjirō and Usui as the two strongest swordsmen, enabling any misdeed. Inspired by the Ikedaya incident of 1864, Shishio plans to set a modern-day fire, prompting Sanosuke to abandon his rematch with Saitō and instead join forces to find Kenshin and defeat Shishio.
39	15	"Between Life and Death"; Transliteration: "Sei to Shi no Hazama de..." (Japanese: 生と死の間で…)	Directed by : Tetsuya Endo; Storyboarded by : Nobuharu Kamanaka	Hideyuki Kurata	Toshimitsu Kobayashi & Kei Saotomé	January 24, 2025
Following a recollection of how he first met a young Kenshin, Hiko continues the training, which sees his student pass the initial test by wounding him to qualify for learning the ogi; Hiko then teaches Kenshin the nine-strike technique Kuzu Ryu Sen, which is capable of killing any opponent instantly, though he emphasizes that the only way to counter it is by mastering the Hiten Mitsurugi Ryu's ultimate technique: the Amakakeru Ryu no Hirameki. While Kenshin grasps that the ogi is a superhuman draw-strike, Hiko rejects his self-sacrificial mentality and grants him a day to reconsider; that night, Hiko recalls finding the orphaned Shinta, who—despite feeling powerless to save his sister-figures from thieves—had tenderly buried all the dead, a compassion that moved Hiko to rename him Kenshin and train him as a swordsman. The next day, as Hiko attacks with the Kuzu Ryu Sen, terrifying Kenshin for the first time since the fall of the Shogunate, hallucinations of Kaoru and his friends restore his will to live, enabling him to perform the Amakakeru Ryu no Hirameki and inflict a severe wound upon his now-satisfied master.
40	16	"The Ten Swords Summoned"; Transliteration: "Juppongatana Shūketsu" (Japanese: 十本刀集結)	Directed by : Koji Aritomi; Storyboarded by : Mahiro Maeda & Takashi Kawabata	Hideyuki Kurata	Masahiro Emoto	January 31, 2025
As Kenshin tends to Hiko's severe wound, Shishio gathers his Ten Swords—minus the imprisoned Chō—at his hideout, vowing to overthrow the Meiji government they despise and usher in their own era, a declaration met with fervent approval; meanwhile, Sōjirō visits Aoshi to report Okina's survival, though the former Oniwaban dismisses this and instead questions Sōjirō about his true desires. Concurrently, Hiko regains consciousness and reveals to Kenshin that his survival was due to the imperfectly forged back of the sakabatō absorbing a portion of the Amakakeru Ryu no Hirameki's impact; though Kenshin declines to become his successor, he entreats Hiko to protect the Aoiya and his friends there while he confronts Shishio's forces.
41	17	"The Other Objective"; Transliteration: "Mō Hitotsu no Mokuteki" (Japanese: もう一つの目的)	Directed by : Ryuta Yamamoto; Storyboarded by : Nobuyoshi Arai	Hideyuki Kurata	Toshimitsu Kobayashi	February 7, 2025
Upon returning to the city, Kenshin encounters Saitō and Sanosuke, who are interrogating Shishio's captured subordinates—some of whom have been spared by Hōji for their failures, though Usui threatens further executions; after being briefly detained, Kenshin meets with Saitō, who reveals Shishio's planned fire attack in Kyoto as disclosed by Chō, though Kenshin intuits that targeting the capital is merely a diversion and that Shishio's true objective is to burn Tokyo. As Kenshin prepares to depart for Kyoto, an angered Sanosuke punches him, vowing to assist despite Saitō's insistence that he remains a liability.
42	18	"As If in Flight"; Transliteration: "Tobu ga Gotoku" (Japanese: 翔ぶが如く)	Directed by : Yoshitaka Makino & Kim Slim; Storyboarded by : Yūsuke Kubo	Hideyuki Kurata	Sakura Takagi, Kazuhisa Kosuge & Ryo Kobayashi	February 14, 2025
Dispatching a letter to the Oniwaban urging them to defend Kyoto in his absence, Kenshin departs for Tokyo alongside Sanosuke and Saitō—who has also stationed his officers to protect the city—while Shishio reveals to a perplexed Yumi the hidden ship within his fleet, which will conceal their forces until the assault on the Meiji government commences.
43	19	"The Great Kyoto Fire"; Transliteration: "Kyōto Taika" (Japanese: 京都大火)	Directed by : Takashi Ueno; Storyboarded by : Shinji Itadaki	Hideyuki Kurata	Hironari Asao, Sakura Takagi, Kazuhisa Kosuge & Kei Saotomé	February 21, 2025
44	20	"The Great Kyoto Fire"; Transliteration: "Kyōto Taika" (Japanese: 京都大火)	Directed by : Tomo Ookubo; Storyboarded by : Mai Mizui & Cozy	Hideyuki Kurata	Toshimitsu Kobayashi	February 28, 2025
45	21	"The Great Kyoto Fire"; Transliteration: "Kyōto Taika" (Japanese: 京都大火)	Directed by : Kōji Aritomi & Neri Mikawa; Storyboarded by : Mie Oishi	Hideyuki Kurata	Kazuo Watanabe, Shinya Kokaji, Kei Saotomé, Hironari Asao, Masahiro Emoto & Sakura Takagi	March 7, 2025
The Oniwaban and police struggle in Kyoto to prevent Shishio's arson but are overpowered by the Ten Swords members Iwanbō, Henya, and Kamatari; meanwhile, Kenshin, Sanosuke, and Saitō locate Shishio's ship, whose dilapidated exterior gives way to reveal a formidable war machine, prompting Kenshin and Saitō to board the vessel—where Shishio, Yumi, Sōjirō, and Hōji await—while Sanosuke employs Anji's technique to counter its firepower, just before Aoshi ambushes Kenshin. Eager for their promised rematch, Aoshi attacks a disillusioned Kenshin as Shishio observes alongside Yumi and Sōjirō; Sanosuke moves to sabotage the ship as Saitō battles its crew until confronted by Sōjirō, while in Kyoto, the Oniwaban, Kaoru, and Yahiko continue fighting the spreading fire until Usui ambushes Misao. Anji rescues Misao, prompting the remaining Ten Swords to withdraw as the blaze ignites, uniting the Oniwaban and citizens to quell the chaos; aboard the ship, Sanosuke uses explosives and Anji's technique to breach its hull, forcing Shishio—who vows never to err again—to interrupt Kenshin and Aoshi's duel and evacuate with his followers, after which Kenshin, Saitō, and Sanosuke return to Kyoto.
46	22	"Tears"; Transliteration: "Namida" (Japanese: なみだ)	Directed by : Tatsuya Shiraishi; Storyboarded by : Shinji Itadaki	Hideyuki Kurata	Masahiro Emoto, Hironari Asao, Sakura Takagi, Toshimitsu Kobayashi & Kazuhisa Kosuge	March 14, 2025
Upon receiving Saitō's update on the containment of the fire, Kenshin and Sanosuke proceed to the Aoiya to await the next confrontation; there, Kenshin reunites with Kaoru as Megumi tends to the wounded, and Okina—now recovered—urges Kenshin to kill Aoshi to end his corruption, though Kenshin insists on Aoshi's lingering humanity, citing his restraint during their duel and specifically his use of the Kaiten Kenbu Rokuren, and vows to return him to the Oniwaban, moving Misao to tears of relief. Meanwhile, Hōji prepares to present Shishio with a new strategy for their impending offensive.
47	23	"A Beautiful Night"; Transliteration: "Migoto na Yoru" (Japanese: 見事な夜)	Kousuke Kuremizu	Hideyuki Kurata	Kazuo Watanabe, Shinya Kokaji, Masahiro Emoto, Hironari Asao, Kazuhisa Kosuge, Sakura Takagi, Toshimitsu Kobayashi & Kei Saotomé	March 21, 2025
Receiving a letter specifying that only Kenshin, Saitō, and he are required for the final confrontation with Shishio, Sanosuke joins them as Hōji outlines a strategy in Shishio's hideout to eliminate these three while dispatching the remaining Ten Swords to destroy the Oniwaban and ensure Kyoto's downfall; enraged by this perceived betrayal, Shishio initially threatens Hōji, though after Hōji falsely claims the earlier plan involved incinerating Kyoto and abandoning its people, Shishio agrees to proceed. Meanwhile, Kenshin confers again with his mentor and, on returning to the Aoiya, tends to a defector from Shishio's army before finding solace among his friends, which grants him the peace of mind that his use of the Amakakeru Ryu no Hirameki will not kill his opponent. As Kenshin, Saitō, and Sanosuke prepare to depart—with Kaoru vowing to return with them to Tokyo—they are met by Aoshi, who awaits Kenshin at the hideout.

== Home media release ==
=== Season 1 ===
==== Japanese ====
Volume	Date	Discs	Episodes
1	October 25, 2023	1	1–3
2	November 22, 2023	1	4–6
3	December 27, 2023	1	7–9
4	January 31, 2024	1	10–12
5	February 28, 2024	1	13–15
6	March 27, 2024	1	16–18
7	April 24, 2024	1	19–21
8	May 29, 2024	1	22–24

==== English ====
Volume	Date	Discs	Episodes
1	January 14, 2025	3	1–12
2	January 14, 2025	3	13–24

=== Season 2 ===
==== Japanese ====
Volume	Date	Discs	Episodes
1	January 29, 2025	1	25–30
2	March 26, 2025	1	31–36
3	May 28, 2025	1	37–42
4	July 30, 2025	1	43–47

==== English ====
Volume	Date	Discs	Episodes
1	February 23, 2026	4	25–36
2	February 23, 2026	4	37–47

== Reception ==
Casandra Ronning of Screen Rant praised the series for its animation and fluid sword fights. She also noted its deeper exploration of the characters and their motivations compared to the 1996 adaptation, as well as its closeness to the original manga.
