= Reol =

Reol may refer to:

- Reol (band), a Japanese musical performance group
- Reol (singer), a Japanese singer
- REOL Productions, American film company from 1921 to 1924
