= Satoru =

- Gender: Male

Origin
- Origin: Japanese
- Meaning: It can have many different meanings depending on the kanji used.

Other names
- Related names: Satoshi

Satoru (さとる, サトル) is a Japanese verb meaning "to know" or "understand". It is a common masculine Japanese given name. Satoru is the root of the Zen Buddhist word Satori (悟り, enlightenment).

== Written forms ==
Satoru can be written using different kanji characters and can mean:

- 悟る, "be spiritually awakened" or "attain higher perception"

as a given name

- 悟, "enlightenment"
- 聡, "smart"
- 智, "wisdom"
- 知, "knowledge"
- 了, "understanding"
- 哲, "philosophy"
- 聖, "virtuous"
- 暁, "daybreak"

The name can also be written in hiragana, as さとる.

== People with the name ==
- Satoru Abe (1926–2025), American painter and sculptor
- Satoru Akahori (あかほり さとる; born 1965), Japanese scriptwriter, novelist and manga author
- Satoru Anabuki (穴吹 智; 1921–2005) Japanese flying ace
- Satoru Arai (荒井 理; born 1947) Japanese luger
- Satoru Asako (浅子 覚; born 1971) Japanese professional wrestler
- Satoru Asari (浅利 悟; born 1974) Japanese former football player
- Satoru Furuta (古田 悟; born 1971) Japanese former basketball player
- Satoru Higashi (東 悟; born 1963), Japanese boxer
- Satoru Hirota (広田 悟; born 1973), Japanese professional golfer
- Satoru Hoshino (星野 悟; born 1989), Japanese football player
- Satoru Ienishi (家西 悟; born 1960), Japanese politician
- Satoru Inoue (井上 悟; born 1971), Japanese sprinter
- Satoru Iwata (岩田 聡; 1959-2015), fourth president and CEO of Nintendo
- Satoru Kamada (鎌田 悟; born 1984), Japanese motorcycle racer
- Satoru Kanemura (金村 曉; born 1976), Japanese former professional baseball pitcher
- Satoru Kawaguchi (川口 覚; born 1982), Japanese actor
- Satoru Kawahara (河原 智), Japanese table tennis player
- Satoru Kitaoka (北岡 悟; born 1980), Japanese shoot wrestler and mixed martial artist
- Satoru Kobayashi (director) (小林 悟; 1930–2001), Japanese film director
- Satoru Kobayashi (footballer) (小林 悟; born 1973), Japanese former football player
- Satoru Kobayashi (Go player) (小林 覚; born 1959), Japanese professional Go player
- Satoru Komiyama (小宮山 悟; born 1965), Japanese professional baseball player
- Satoru Kōsaki (神前 暁; born 1974), Japanese music composer
- Satoru Maruoka (丸岡 悟; born 1997), Japanese footballer
- Satoru Matsuhashi (松橋 暁; born 1961), Japanese ski jumper
- Satoru Matsuo (松尾 諭; born 1975), Japanese actor and voice actor
- Satoru Misawa (三沢 悟; born 1943), Japanese ice hockey player
- Satoru Miyano (宮野 悟; born 1954), Japanese bioinformatician
- Satoru Miyoshi (三好 悟; born 1963), Japanese rower
- Satoru Mizushima (水島 総; born 1949), Japanese film maker
- Satoru Mochizuki (望月 聡; born 1964), Japanese football manager and former football player
- Satoru Nakajima (中嶋 悟; born 1953), Japanese racing driver
- Satoru Nakamura (Scouting) (中村 知; 1893–1972), Japanese educator and Scouting leader
- Satoru Nakamura (中村 覚; 1854–1925), Japanese career soldier
- Satoru Nakamura (Japanese journalist) (仲村 覚; born 1964), Japanese journalist
- Satoru Nakano (中野 悟; born 1947), Japanese swimmer
- Satoru Nishita (サトル ニシタ; 1927–2013), Japanese landscape architect
- Satoru Nishizono (西園 悟; born 1962), Japanese anime and tokusatsu screenwriter
- Satoru Noda (artist) (野田 サトル), Japanese manga artist
- Satoru Noda (footballer) (野田 知; born 1969), Japanese footballer
- Satoru Nomura (野村 悟; born 1946), Japanese Yakuza leader
- Satoru Okada (岡田 智), general manager of Nintendo Research & Engineering
- Satoru Oki (大木 暁}; born 1992), Japanese football player
- Satoru Ono (小野 了; 1915–2001), Japanese officer and ace fighter pilot
- Satoru Otomo (大友 哲; born 1957), a Japanese astronomer
- Satoru Ozawa (小沢 さとる; born 1937), Japanese manga artist
- Satoru Sakaguchi (阪口 悟; born 1978), Japanese shogi player
- Satoru Sakuma (佐久間 悟; born 1963), Japanese former football player and manager
- Satoru Sasaki (佐々木 悟; born 1985), Japanese long-distance runner
- Satoru Sayama (佐山 聡; born 1957), Japanese professional wrestler
- Satoru Shibata (柴田 聡; born 1962), president of Nintendo of Europe
- Satoru Someya (染谷 悟; 1965–2003), Japanese freelance journalist
- Satoru Sudo (須藤 悟; born 1970), Japanese ice sledge hockey player
- Satoru Suzuki (鈴木 悟; born 1975), Japanese former football player
- Satoru Tanigawa (谷川 聡; born 1972), Japanese hurdler
- Satoru Terao (寺尾 悟; born 1975), Japanese speed skater
- Satoru Uyama (宇山 賢; born 1991), Japanese right-handed épée fencer
- Satoru Yamagishi (山岸 智; born 1983), Japanese football player
- Satoru Yamamoto (山本 悟; 1925–2006), Grand Chamberlain of Japan
- Satoru Yamamoto (sailor) (山本 悟; born 1963), Japanese sailor
- Satoru Yasuda (安田 覚; born 1975), Japanese pole vaulter
- Satoru Yoneoka (米岡 聡; born 1985), Japanese PTVI Paratriathlete
- Satoru Yoshida (吉田 悟; born 1970), Japanese footballer

== Fictional characters ==
- Satoru Gojo (五条 悟), one of the protagonists in Jujutsu Kaisen ‘The strongest’
- Satoru (サトル), a side character in the manga and anime series One Punch Man
- Satoru Akefu (明負 悟), a major antagonist in the eighth part of JoJo's Bizarre Adventure series JoJolion
- Satoru Akashi (明石 暁), the main hero of the tokusatsu series GoGo Sentai Boukenger
- Satoru Arihara (在原 暁), the main character in the visual novel RIDDLE JOKER
- Satoru Fujinuma (藤沼 悟), the main character in the manga, anime, and film Boku Dake ga Inai Machi
- Satoru Furuya (降谷 暁), a character in the manga and anime series Ace of Diamond
- Satoru Hani (羽仁 悟), a character in the manga and anime series Shion no Ō
- Satoru Ikaruga (悟), the main character in the manga series D-Live!!
- Satoru Kakuta (角田 悟), the main character in the manga, anime, and film Slam Dunk
- Satoru Kamio (神尾 悟), a character in the manga and anime series Gingitsune
- Satoru Kanzaki (悟), a character in the manga and anime series Area 88
- Satoru Mikami (三上 悟), a character and Rimuru Tempest's previous self in That Time I Got Reincarnated as a Slime
- Satoru Ohkura (大蔵 智), a character in the Japanese drama Atashinchi no Danshi
- Satoru Shido (獅堂 覚), a character in the anime series Magic Knight Rayearth
- Satoru Tojo (東條 悟), a character in the tokusatsu series Kamen Rider Ryuki
- Satoru Toyama (兎山悟), a character in the anime series Wonderful PreCure!
- Satoru Tsukada (悟る 塚田), a character in the web comics Randal's Friends
- Satoru Yotsumura (四ツ村 暁), a character in the manga series Sakamoto Days

== See also ==
- 8485 Satoru, a main-belt asteroid
