= Tomohiro Kojiri =

- 小尻 知博
- Born: 12 December 1957; Kure, Hiroshima Prefecture, Japan
- Died: 4 May 1987 (aged 29); Asahi Shimbun Hanshin Bureau, Nishinomiya, Hyōgo Prefecture, Japan
- Cause of death: Gunshot wound
- Resting place: Hiroshima Prefecture, Japan
- Education: Ritsumeikan University
- Occupation: Journalist
- Years active: Until 1987
- Employer: Asahi Shimbun
- Known for: Journalist killed in the Asahi Shimbun Hanshin bureau attack
- Notable work: Story on police discrimination on Japan's Korean minority
- Spouse: Yuko Kojiri
- Children: 1

Tomohiro Kojiri (Japanese: 小尻知博; December 12, 1957 – May 4, 1987) was a Japanese journalist for the Tokyo-based newspaper Asahi Shimbun. Kojiri was killed in Nishinomiya, Hyōgo Prefecture, near Osaka, during a shooting at the Asahi Shimbun bureau; the shooter also fired at two other people, injuring one. Investigators believed that Kojiri was targeted by a right-wing, political extremist group known as Sekihōtai (Japanese: 赤報隊), as Kojiri had written a story about Japanese discrimination against the Korean minority, and typed letters were sent in the group's name claiming responsibility. It was the first attack on a newspaper in Japan since 1972. The attack is known in Japan as the Asahi Shimbun Hanshin bureau attack [ja].

== Personal ==
Tomohiro Kojiri's parents are Nobukatsu and Miyoko Kojiri and his hometown was Kure, Hiroshima Prefecture. He and his wife Yuko had a daughter named Miki who was two years old at the time of his death.

== Career ==
He was notable for his articles that described Japan's discrimination against the Korean minority. Shortly after his death on May 4, 1987, a letter was sent to Kyodo News Agency from an unknown group called Sekihotai claiming responsibility for Kojiri's death and said "We do not accept anyone who betrays Japan. We sentence all Asahi Shimbun employees to death."

== Death ==
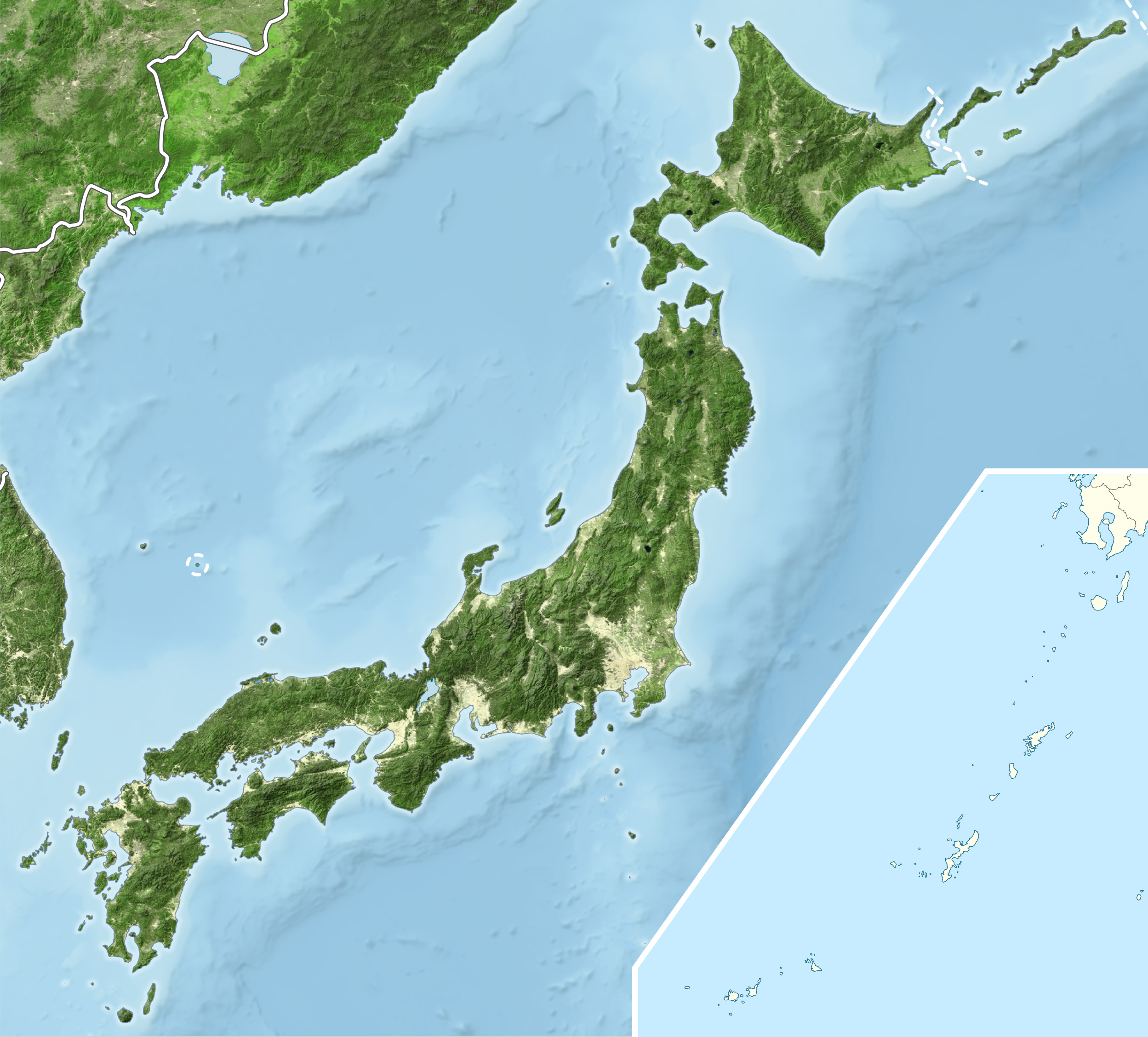
Hyōgo Prefecture

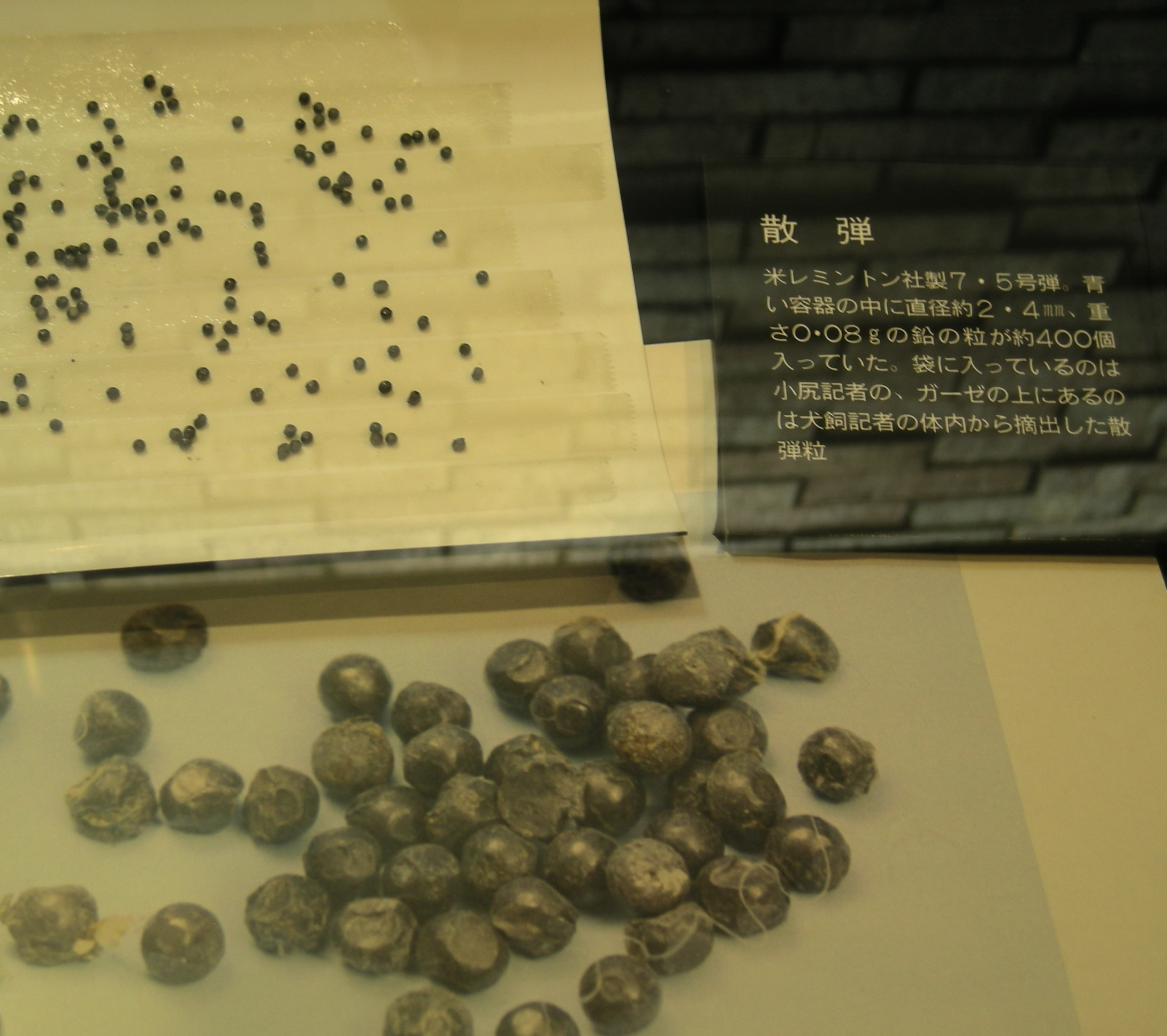
Gun shot removed from reporter's body

Tomohiro Kojiri was killed on a Sunday night, May 4, 1987, at the Asahi Shimbun bureau in Nishinomiya. He was murdered by a suspected extremist group called Sekihotai. The suspect was a masked man who entered the building and came onto the second level with a shotgun. During the shooting at the bureau of Asahi Shimbun, the masked man shot and badly injured Kojiri, 29, who later died at the hospital from his injuries. Hyoe Inukai, 42, sustained a chest injury and was deemed to be in critical condition. Only Kenji Takayama escaped unscathed. Takayama described in a news conference his experience and what he said was the sound of firecrackers and that all he could remember was the blood splattered on the floor. Police began a search for the assailant immediately. Police continued to investigate the crime up until the statute of limitations had passed without the case being solved.

== Context ==
Kojiri wrote an article for Asahi Shimbun on Japan police officials treating Korean minorities with little respect. Some say that is the reason why he was targeted and killed but police officials have denied this. Kojiri wrote in his article that the Hyogo Prefecture (state) police conducted an unlawful tactic where they had clamped a Korean resident's arm and pinned him down by force. That caused tension between the police and Korean residents, who have been living in Japan almost their entire lives, as well to the Asahi Shimbun bureau and Kojiri.

A rightist group calling itself a special unit Sekihōtai of the Japanese Independent Volunteer Army (日本民族独立義勇軍) sent typed letters to Japanese media, claiming it had carried out the murder and threatened to kill other "anti-Japanese elements" in the media. At the time of Kojiri's death, the group said that their mission was to "punish anti-Japanese elements inside and outside Japan". The letter claimed the attack on Ashai was only the "first step". Supposedly the group disappeared in 1990. No one in the group has been identified or arrested. There is no evidence if the group disbanded because it had achieved its goals.

The previous attack on a newspaper was in 1972.

== Impact ==
Kojiri is one of the few Japanese journalists who have been killed as a result of their reporting. Shootings in Japan are extremely rare as owning a gun is tightly restricted and this news was reported in Japan and throughout the world. In 2003, Satoru Someya became the first Japanese journalist killed since Tomohiro Kojiri.

== Reactions ==
Immediately after the news of Kojiri's murder, the Japan Congress of Journalists condemned the attack.

The Committee to Protect Journalists released a statement that said, "CPJ is deeply disappointed that the murder of our colleague Tomohiro Kojiri was never prosecuted, despite extensive efforts by police to find his killer. Around the world, crimes against journalists tend to go unpunished, creating a climate of impunity that makes the press more vulnerable to attack."

Asahi Shimbun has held a memorial for him every year. On the anniversary of Kojiri's death, the president of Asahi Shimbun Kotaro Akiyama and 80 other employees dedicated a moment of silence on May 3 at 8:15 p.m. on the third floor in the Nishionmiya branch where the attack occurred.

Police and detectives paid their respects at the Asahi Shimbun's Hanshin Bureau in Nishinomiya where they lay flowers and offer prayers to Tomohiro Kojiri. Hyogo Prefectural Police Chief Kaoru Okada said that he will continue to look for the murderer even after the statute of limitations expired back in 2002. He hopes that Kojiri will help guide them to his murderer. Seishi Yamashita who was a former detective at the time of Kojiri's death, and he was the head detective on the case. When he came to pay his respects he apologized and said, "I apologized to Mr. Kojiri in front of his portrait (at the altar) for failing to arrest the killer. I will bear responsibility for that failure for the rest of my life."

Rie Kinoshita, a 17-year old who hoped to become a newspaper reporter, said this killing wouldn't stop her from pursuing her career. She said, "The crime was so horrible, but it has brought about more anger than fear for me. I told the portrait of Mr. Kojiri of my determination to become a reporter." Asahi Shimbun President Shinichi Hakoshima, who came to visit the grave, said the statute of limitations fueled his fire against the crime and said “In order that Kojiri’s death as a reporter was not in vain, we will never give in to threats."
