= Sigma (album) =

- Standard CD and digital artwork

Studio album by REOL
- Released: October 19, 2016
- Recorded: 2015–2016
- Genres: Electronic dance; hip hop
- Length: 46:38
- Label: Toy's Factory
- Producers: Reol; Koichi Inaba (executive prod.)

REOL chronology
Sigma (2016)	Endless EP (2017)

Singles from Sigma
- 1. "ChiruChiru" Released: June 30, 2016; 2. "Give Me a Break Stop Now" Released: August 18, 2016; 3. "YoiYoi Kokon" Released: September 15, 2016

Sigma (stylized with the Greek symbol Σ) is the only studio album by Japanese musical unit REOL. It was released on October 19, 2016 by Toy's Factory in two physical editions—a standard CD, and a CD and DVD bundle—and for digital consumption. Prior to their formation, each member—Reol, Giga and Okiku—worked with each other on numerous musical projects until finalizing a record contract with Toy's Factory in early 2016. The material on the album were written, sung and co-composed by Reol, while production was handled by all three artists and arranged by Giga.

Sigma is an electronic dance album that incorporates elements of hip-hop, contemporary pop and club sounds. Lyrically, the record delves into enjoyment, love, having fun and a variety of expressions, all encased by their current state of mind, as described by them as "transitory". Upon its release, Sigma received positive reviews from music critics. Several commentators complimented the group's musical direction, alongside Reol's vocals and commercial appeal.

Commercially, Sigma experienced moderate success in Japan, reaching the top ten on both the Oricon Albums Chart and Japan Hot Albums chart, the latter hosted by Billboard. In order to promote the album, the album tracks: "ChiruChiru", "Give Me a Break Stop Now", and "YoiYoi Kokon" were served as digital singles, accompanied with additional music videos co-created by Okiku. Furthermore, REOL had appeared on several promotional formats such as live performances, magazines and interviews on social media.

== Background ==
Reol and Giga had consistently worked together prior to forming the musical unit REOL, providing compositions and vocals to several Japanese vocaloid acts such as Hatsune Miku. Additionally, Reol and art director Okiku had been long-time friends and occasionally collaborated with her music videos and packaging for her releases. Reol and Giga's first project as a duo was No Title, which was released on August 17, 2014 through Japanese label Celo Project. Furthermore, Reol continued working on her debut studio album, titled Gokusaishiki. It was released on July 29, 2015 through Victor Entertainment, and reached the top ten on the Oricon Albums Chart. Subsequently, Reol, Giga, and Okiku signed a record contract with Japanese label Toy's Factory, forming themselves as a unit under Reol's name—capitalized as REOL. Despite this, the trio stayed anonymous with their identity, using anime-influenced illustrations and chibi designs to depict themselves; several other animations were also distributed in their subsequent music videos. But on August 18, REOL made their debut appearance in the music video for their track "Give Me a Break Stop Now".

== Composition and material ==
The material on Sigma were written, composed and produced by member Reol, whom also provided vocals to each track; bandmate, Giga, received additional music credits towards composing and arranging the album. The album was recorded between 2015 and 2016 in Japan, and was mixed Giga. Additionally, Hiromichi Takiguchi mastered the record alongside Giga, which was finalized on September 1 with the music videos. Despite the groups experimentation with J-Pop, general pop music and indie rock music, both as a trio and individually, Sigma is an electronic dance album that incorporates elements of hip-hop and club sounds. According to Giga, the record was heavily influenced by Westernized music, both contemporary pop and EDM, and also noted inspiration of K-Pop and modern Korean pop culture.

The first song created for the project was "Detarame Kidding", an "interesting" collaboration between the two but was briefly shelved. However, Reol started to re-edit the track and after completing it, she Skyped Giga the results. This allowed the singer to compose the tracks herself, resulting into the three album inclusions "VIP Kid", "Re:" and "404 Not Found". In an interview with Billboard Japan, the members commented that the lyrical content emphasizes enjoyment and how they are feeling at current state, noting it as "transitory"; they had chosen the album tracks "YoiYoi Kokon" and "Give Me a Break Stop Now" as examples of this. Similarly, the group told Music-Lounge.jp that songs like "Give Me a Break Stop Now" delves into Reol's anger and irresponsibility, while "YoiYoi Kokon" was inspired by the Gion Matsuri event in Kyoto, and represents a sign of celebration and change.

Although majority of the tracks were commissioned throughout its production process, Reol stated that the song "Re:" was originally left out of the final product. However, because Okiku and Giga identified it as one of their favorite recordings—Okiku described it as "lovely" and "cute"—Reol added into the record. On the album, tracks like "Konoyo Loading..." and "Summer Horror Party" contrast between an "innocent" and "cute" vocal delivery, and the group's initial aesthetic and lyrical content. Reol believed that these tracks were examples of her departure from her rock-influenced work as a solo artist. Sigma also includes one interlude track, "Final Sigma", which samples Reol's previous releases alongside material from Sigma.

== Release and packaging ==
On August 18, 2016, the group announced the release for their studio album Sigma, scheduled on October 19, 2016. Released in both physical and digital formats, pre-ordered versions through Japanese retail CDJapan.co.jp included a limited edition poster featuring the members. Two bonus tracks were issued through different stores in Japan; the first was the Tenka Toritai remix of "OedoRanvu" at Tower Record stores, whilst an Okinawa Ikitai remix of "Drop Pop Candy" was announced at Tsutaya shops. Both remixes were distributed on music cards, where consumers had to use a special code to access the recordings. The title of the album was based on several theories; member Reol said it first came from the thought of a somewhat internet slang, then it progressed with the literal sense of Summation (a term in Mathematics), and the phenomenon of artists' interest of symbolizing their records with one word/phrase. Additionally, she said that the sigma term through mathematics represented the group as a whole. The cover art and design was directed by Okiku and photographed by Kenichi Sonehara; it depicts Reol in a small 4x4 room, effected by static imagery. According to member Okiku, the artwork was thought out by the result of the songs' lyrics and sound.

=== Singles ===
"ChiruChiru", "Give Me a Break Stop Now", and "YoiYoi Kokon" were served as digital singles on October 7, 2016 via iTunes Store, as part of a pre-order promotion with the album. Additionally, the songs received music videos, all produced and co-directed by the group member Okiku. The first promotional visual was "ChiruChiru", which was released June 30, 2016; it features footage of random locations in Japan, overlapped with several animated characters and lyrics of the song. It also includes several video shots of objects, such as tree branches, flowers, and building walls. The second visual was "Give Me a Break Stop Now", published on August 18 via YouTube and NicoNico. REOL made their debut appearance in the video, which represents the group's vocalist as a queen-like monarch and several other personas. The third video from the album was "YoiYoi Kokon", which incorporates several traditional Asian objects, symbols and aquatic life. The song is sung with archaic Japanese words, and a "modern" translation is transcribed on the video, as well. It was distributed through the band's YouTube and Reol's NicoVideo account on September 15. In order to promote the album's remaining material in the days prior to release, Reol uploaded a crossfade video that included snippets of each track and additional visuals that represented them.

== Reception ==
Upon its release, Sigma received positive reviews from music critics. Although the record wasn't analysed in depth, an editor at Barks.jp described the commercial appeal and sound as "delicious". Similarly, a member at JRockNews.com commended its production, and highlighted Reol's singing and rapping abilities. An editor from Music-Lounge.jp complimented the records exploration with electronic dance music, and also highlight Reol's vocal deliveries. Additionally, the reviewer noted that the material worked well without sounding "uncomfortable" with rap, EDM and other deliveries from the group. Japanese magazine CD Journal commended Sigma's mixture of genres and Reol's vocal performance. The reviewer also labelled the material "catchy", and believed that Reol's singing portrayed a "big personality within the group."

Commercially, the album experienced moderate success in Japan. It debuted at number six on the Daily Oricon Albums Chart, marking it the fifth highest debut entry on October 18. The following day, it stayed in the same position. The record further stayed in the top ten for the following five days and, based on these statistics, it opened at number eight on the weekly chart, accumulating 10,026 sales. It fell outside the top 50 the following week, one of the biggest drops between October 26 to November 2. At the end of October, Oricon ranked the album at number 39 with claimed sales of 11,493 copies.

Sigma proved to be generally successful on three competent charts hosted by Billboard. In Japan, it debuted at number eight on the Hot Albums chart, and number seven on the Top Albums Sales chart. The following week saw a slump in sales, sliding to number 31 and number 44 on both charts. During its third week, it fell outside the top 50 on the Hot Albums chart to number 76, and number 66 on the Top Album Sales chart. In the United States, Sigma made its debut at number nine on the World Albums Chart; it was the fourth highest debuting album and furthermore the second highest Japanese entry of November 5, 2016, behind Fantome by Hikaru Utada. Additionally, the record experienced success worldwide upon its release on iTunes Store; it topped the iTunes chart in Singapore, Thailand, Philippines, Indonesia, Malaysia, Taiwan and Hong Kong, and managed to enter the top 20 in countries throughout Europe, the United States, Australia, New Zealand, areas in South East Asia and Canada. Its success outside of Japan was noted as a similarity to the success of Fantôme (2016) by Japanese-American musician Hikaru Utada, which was released three weeks prior to Sigma.

== Promotion ==
In order to promote Sigma, REOL had appeared on several promotional formats such as live performances, magazines and interviews. They made their first live debut UNICA Vision at Seibu-Shinjuku Station on October 17, 2016, where they also signed autographs and previewed new tracks from the album. They made two guest appearances on Japanese radio stations: one for FM Yokohama's Tresen+, whilst the second was for a special broadcast with Japan Hot 100. Additionally, Reol made an appearance on Tower Records free magazine Bounce, the October 25 issue. Furthermore, REOL went on to promote the record with several social media interviews; their first interview was with Natalie.mu. 11 days later, the group visited CD Journal to conduct a small interview, alongside announcing the release of Sigma that same day. Then between 20–21 October, the group paid a visit to EMTG Music and Music-Lounge.jp to talk about their work, and their most recent interview was with Realsound.jp on October 30.

== Track listing ==
All lyrics are written by Reol.

CD / digital download.
No.	Title	Music	Arranger(s)	Length
1.	"VIP KID"	Reol	Giga	3:52
2.	"Give Me a Break Stop Now" (ギミアブレスタッナウ)	Giga	Giga	3:41
3.	"YoiYoi Kokon" (宵々古今)	Reol; Giga	Giga	4:17
4.	"Konoyo Loading..." (コノヨLoading...)	Reol; Giga	Giga	3:25
5.	"RE:"	Reol	Giga	3:23
6.	"Lunatic"	Reol; Giga	Giga	3:17
7.	"Kamisama ni Natta Hi" (神様になった日)	Reol; Giga	Giga	4:05
8.	"ChiruChiru" (ちるちる)	Giga	Giga	3:17
9.	"-FINAL SIGMA-"	Giga	Giga	1:57
10.	"DetaramE KiddinG"	Reol; Giga	Giga	3:17
11.	"Summer Horror Party" (サマーホラーパーティ)	Reol; Giga	Giga	4:14
12.	"404 not found"	Reol	Giga	4:04
13.	"VIORA"	Giga	Giga	3:42

Tower Records edition.
No.	Title	Music	Arranger(s)	Length
14.	"Oedo Ranvu" (Tenka Toritai Remix)	Tenka Toritai	Tenka Toritai

Tsutaya edition.
No.	Title	Music	Arranger(s)	Length
14.	"Drop Pop Candy" (Okinawa Ikitai Remix)	Okinawa Ikitai	Okinawa Ikitai
Total length:				3:50

== Personnel ==
Credits adapted from the liner notes of the special edition of Sigma.

- Recorded in Japan, 2015–16 by REOL. Mixed by Giga, mastered by Hiromichi Takiguchi and Giga.

Music

- Reol – vocals, background vocals, composing, production, songwriting, programming, recording
- Giga – composing, arranging, background vocals, mixing, mastering, production
- Okiku – production
- Tenka Torita – remixing
- Okinawa Ikitai – remixing
- Hiromichi Takiguchi – mastering, engineering
- Koichi Inaba – executive producer

Visuals

- Toshitaka Shinoda – art creative director
- Shun Sasaki – art direction, design
- Kenichi Sonehara – photographer
- Chie Syutou – CG Retoucher
- Miyabi – stylist
- Atushi Takita – hair stylist
- Shino Ariizumi – make-up artist
- Okiku – art producer, art director
- Asuka Takizawa – art producer
- Manami Oshiro – art producer
- Yuichiro Okuchi – Co-ordination with Sony Music Communications

Management

- Koichi Inaba – A&R producer
- Yuri Ichinose – A&R director
- Mayu Tamimoto – A&R public relations
- Koji Iwase – A&R assistant
- Momomi Funayama – management assistant
- Junko Hasegawa – sales promotion
- Nao Higashikage – sales promotion
- Takahiro Fujimoto – sales promotion
- Nyurika Delic – management
- Nera K – management
- Koko Shimana – management

== Charts ==
Chart (2016)	Peak position
Japan Daily Chart (Oricon)	6
Japan Weekly Chart (Oricon)	8
Japan Monthly Chart (Oricon)	39
Japan Hot Albums (Billboard)	8
Japan Top Albums Sales (Billboard)	7
US World Albums (Billboard)	9

== Certifications ==
Region	Certification	Certified units/sales
Japan	—	11,493
