= Red Lion (film) =

- Original Japanese poster
- Directed by: Kihachi Okamoto
- Written by: Sakae Hirosawa; Kihachi Okamoto
- Produced by: Toshiro Mifune; Yoshio Nishikawa
- Starring: Toshiro Mifune; Shima Iwashita
- Cinematography: Takao Saito
- Music by: Masaru Sato
- Distributed by: Toho Company Ltd.
- Release date: October 10, 1969 (Japan)
- Running time: 115 minutes
- Country: Japan
- Language: Japanese

Red Lion (Japanese: 赤毛, Hepburn: Akage) is a 1969 Japanese film directed by Kihachi Okamoto and starring Toshirō Mifune and Shima Iwashita.

== Plot summary ==
Gonzo (権三, Toshiro Mifune), a member of the Sekihōtai, is being asked by the emperor to deliver official news to his home village of a New World Order. Wanting to pose as a military officer, he dons a peculiar officer's wig. Upon his return, his attempt to tell the village about a brand-new tax cut is quashed when the townfolk mistakenly assumes that he is there to rescue them from corrupt government officials. He learns that an evil magistrate has been swindling them for years. Now, he has to help the village, ward off Shogunate supporters, along with the fact that he can't read his own proclamations.

The director, Kihachi Okamoto, is well known for introducing plot twists and surprising endings in his films, and Red Lion is no exception. What starts out as an almost comedic series of misunderstandings between almost comically drawn characters ends up turning far more serious as the film progresses. Tomi (Shima Iwashita), as Gonzo's old flame, is tragically torn between her hopes that Gonzo's new marriage proposal is genuine, and her fears that her life will never improve unless she "goes along" with the corrupt and powerful who rule over the peasant's lives. The film ends with the peasants dancing to the cry of "Ee ja nai ka" ("Why not!?", "Whatever!", or "Nevermind!"), which fatalistically refers to the tumultuous 1866-67 period of Japanese history immediately preceding the imperial restoration and the end of the Edo period.

== Cast ==
- Toshirō Mifune : Gonzo
- Shima Iwashita : Tomi
- Takahiro Tamura : Sagara Sōzō
- Etsushi Takahashi : Ichinose Hanzo
- Nobuko Otowa : Oharu
- Shigeru Kōyama : Aragaki Yaichirō
- Yūnosuke Itō :Kamio Kintarō
- Hideyo Amamoto : Gensai
- Takeo Chii : Spy
- Gorō Mutsumi
- Shin Kishida : Usakichi
- Jun Hamamura : Kanbei
- Sachio Sakai : Kesaji
- Bokuzen Hidari : Gohei

== See also ==
- Eijanaika, a 1981 film by Shōhei Imamura set in the same historical period.
