= Ee ja nai ka =

Carnivalesque celebrations, communal activities, and protests in Japan in 1867–68

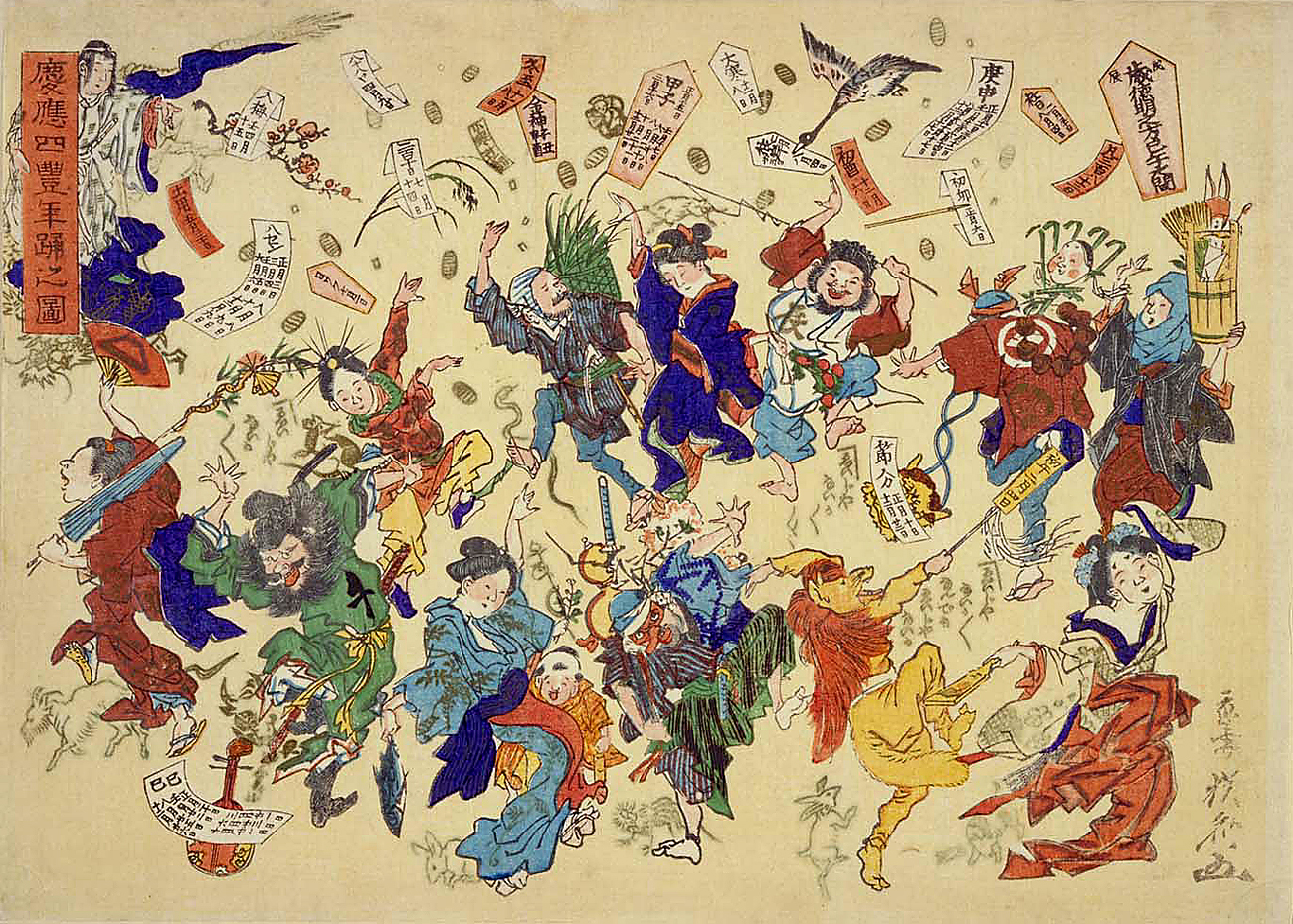
"Ee ja nai ka" dancing scene, 1868

Ee ja nai ka (ええじゃないか; lit. 'isn't it good') was a complex of carnivalesque religious celebrations and communal activities, often understood as social or political protests, which occurred in many parts of Japan from June 1867 to May 1868, at the end of the Edo period and the start of the Meiji Restoration. Particularly intense during the Boshin War and Bakumatsu, the movement originated in the Kansai region, near Kyoto.

== History ==
In West Japan, ee ja nai ka appeared at first in the form of dancing festivals, often related to public works, rain magic, or dances for the dead. When sacred amulets were said to have fallen from heaven, thanksgiving celebrations for these amulets were added that could last for several days and effectively took whole rural and urban communities away from everyday life. Gifts were exchanged, youth groups organized mass dances which included cross-dressing, elaborate costumes, or not wearing clothes at all. To express their gratitude towards the kami or buddhas who had given them the amulets, many people went on pilgrimages to local or regional sanctuaries. The term ee ja nai ka was a refrain in popular songs performed during these activities and was therefore later chosen as their title. The phrase's meaning is also both defiant and fatalistic, and it translates as "Who cares?", "Why not?" or "What the hell?", along the lines of "Who cares if we take our clothes off?", "Who cares if we have sex?".

The great diversity and rivalry of religious practice in pre-modern Japan helped shape the range of events. It has been suggested that religious activists, such as priests and itinerant preachers, played a major role in fabricating the "amulet showers", and some suspects were even caught in the act by alert officers. Youth interested in celebrating parties, or in becoming spiritual leaders, were also suspected and in some cases convicted.

Ee ja nai ka was not linked to any specific political platform, though it is often understood "as a form of political protest when other ways [were] blocked", in reaction to the crumbling Tokugawa shogunate. Disappointment regarding the lack of governing political leadership, disgust at Western and Christian foreigners, and other signs of social/political critique were frequently displayed. There is no evidence for any coordinated political setup or staging of ee ja nai ka, although this was also rumoured.

The movement spread across Japan, eventually descending to mob violence before coming to an end. The end of ee ja nai ka was concurrent with the beginning of the Meiji Restoration and the Western-style modernization of Japan.

A British translator, Ernest Mason Satow, recalled that he had seen:

Crowds of people in holiday garb, dancing and singing "ii janai ka, ii janai ka" ...... houses decorated with rice cakes in all colours, oranges, little bags, straw and flowers. The dresses worn were chiefly red crape, a few blue and purple. Many of the dancers carried red lanterns on their heads.

== In popular culture ==
- In 1981, Japanese director Shohei Imamura produced his film Eijanaika, which gives a deliberately historically incorrect interpretation of the events but nevertheless catches the unstable and tense atmosphere of the age. Imamura had previously helped write the 1957 Yuzo Kawashima film on the period Sun in the Last Days of the Shogunate. This era was also depicted in the 1969 Kihachi Okamoto-directed Toshirō Mifune film Red Lion, as well as in Ryoma Ansatsu, (1974, Kazuo Kuroki). The ee ja nai ka activities, hitherto unknown as part of Japanese history during the Bakumatsu, have in recent years been included and alluded to in mainstream historical productions, such as the NHK Taiga dramas Ryōmaden and Yae no Sakura.
- Like a Dragon: Ishin! - Appears in a series of sub stories within the game.
- Bakumatsu Kikansetsu Irohanihoheto - At the beginning of episode 8 of the anime, the story involves an incident of Ee Ja Nai Ka as part of the plot.
- The Japanese band Soul Flower Union uses the term "ee ja nai ka" as the title and refrain in the first song of their 1996 album, Electro ASYL-Bop.
