= Sekihōtai =

Japanese extremist group

- 赤報隊
- Active: February 1, 1868
- Disbanded: February 27, 1868
- Country: Japan
- Allegiance: Government of Meiji Japan

Commanders
- Leader 1: Ayanokoji Toshizane
- Leader 2: Shigenoi Mikihisa
- 1st Unit Leader: Sagara Sōzō
- 2nd Unit Leader: Suzuki Mikisaburō
- 3rd Unit Leader: Yukawa Rensaburō

The Sekihōtai (赤報隊; "Red Herald Regiment") was a Japanese revolutionary group formed in 1868 during the Boshin War.

== History ==
=== Formation ===
During the Boshin War, the Sekihōtai was formed on February 1, 1868 at Kongōrin-ji temple in Matsuoji, Ōmi Province with the support of Saigō Takamori and Iwakura Tomomi. Imperial court officials Ayanokoji Toshizane and Shigenoi Kinhisa were appointed as leaders of the army.

The Sekihōtai had three units. Sagara Sōzō was the captain of the first unit. The Sekihōtai's second unit had as its captain the former captain of the Shinsengumi's ninth unit, Suzuki Mikisaburō, and was composed of his elder brother Itō Kashitarō's followers who had deserted the Shinsengumi. The third unit's captain was Yukawa Rensaburō of the Minakuchi Clan and it was composed mainly of Minakuchi Clan warriors.

The Sekihōtai traveled the countryside spreading news about the upcoming change of regime. The Meiji government had made promises such as tax cuts that could not be kept, so the Sekihōtai were used as a scapegoat, with the government calling them a "false army".

=== Disbandment ===
The Sekihōtai's actions gradually became a burden to the new government which repealed the 50% reduction in land rent on the 27th. On the same day, Ayanokoji Toshizane was ordered by his father Ōhara Shigetomi to return to Kyoto. The 2nd and 3rd units returned to Kyoto without the 1st unit. The 1st unit—which was under Sagara Sōzō—changed its name to Tobaku Senpo Kyodotai Sekihotai (倒幕先鋒嚮導隊赤報隊) and continued its attack along the Tosan Highway.

Sagara and members of the first unit were arrested on March 24, 1868 outside Shimosuwa and were sentenced to death by decapitation on March 26, 1868. However, Suzuki and the second unit continued to serve the Ishin Shishi (Imperialists). As for the members of third unit, many were executed due to their plundering behavior.

== Other usage ==
Recently, the name Sekihōtai refers to a 1980s political group of a similarly extreme, though less military bent. The full name of the group was Nippon Minzoku Dokuritsu Giyugun Betsudo Sekihōtai, which translates roughly as Blood Revenge Division of the People's Partisan Corps Working for the Independence of the Japanese Race. This group was responsible for the death of reporter, Tomohiro Kojiri, when a member fired a shotgun at the Hanshin Bureau of the Asahi Shimbun in Nishinomiya, Hyōgo Prefecture on January 24, 1987. The group also made several threats against the lives of two prime ministers, Yasuhiro Nakasone and Noboru Takeshita, citing as their cause the changes made to textbooks about World War II. The actions of the Sekihōtai have been listed as evidence of increased violence among Japanese political extremists.

The case was named Metropolitan Designated Case 116. The statute of limitations on the crimes expired in March 2003, but supralegal investigations have been made since.

In February 2009, a group claiming to be Sekihōtai sent threatening messages to a NHK news anchor.

== Fiction ==
- In the manga and anime series Rurouni Kenshin, the character Sagara Sanosuke was the sole survivor of the first unit. Although fictional, he is described as being the adopted son of Sagara Sozo.
- In the 1969 film Red Lion (film), the protagonist, a stammering, none-too-bright foot soldier named Gonzo, is a member of the first unit.
