= Reol (band) =

Musical group

REOL
- Origin: Japan
- Genres: EDM
- Years active: 2015–2017
- Labels: Toy's Factory
- Members: Reol; Giga; Okiku
- Website: Official site

REOL (stylized as RΞOL) was a Japanese musical unit that consisted of vocalist/lyricist Reol, Vocaloid music arranger Giga, and movie director/producer Okiku. The members of REOL originally worked as solo artists, but they signed to Toy's Factory as a group in 2015, using Reol's name for the project. Prior to this unit's formation, Reol and Giga consistently worked together throughout Reol's solo career, eventually releasing an album together titled No Title. Their debut studio album as the unit REOL, Sigma, was released on October 19, 2016. The group disbanded in October 2017.

== Career ==
=== 2014–2017: Prior releases and Sigma ===
Prior to the formation of REOL, the group's members, Reol and Giga, had consistently worked together, providing compositions and vocals to several Japanese vocaloids including Hatsune Miku, Kagamine Rin, Kagamine Len and more. Their first release as a duo through label, Celo Project, was No Title, which was released on August 17, 2014. Additionally, Reol worked on her 2015 debut studio album, titled Gokusaishiki, which reached the top ten on the Oricon Albums Chart.

Subsequently, Reol, Giga, and movie director Okiku signed a recording contract to Japanese label Toy's Factory, forming themselves as a unit under Reol's name. The group members stayed anonymous with their identities, using anime-influenced illustrations to depict themselves in their music videos. Their studio album Sigma, was released on October 19, 2016. Additionally, they released three videos from the album: "ChiruChiru", "Give Me a Break Stop Now", and "YoiYoi Kokon". Sigma debuted at number six on the Daily Oricon Albums Chart.

On August 1, 2017, REOL announced that they would separate in October 2017 after playing their final two shows.

== Discography ==
=== Albums ===
Year	Album details	Peak chart positions		Certifications
Year	Album details	JPN	US World	Certifications
2016	Sigma: Released: October 19, 2016	8	9	
2017	Endless EP: Released: October 11, 2017			
"—" denotes releases that did not chart or was not released.
