= Satoru Someya =

Japanese freelance crime journalist

- 染谷悟
- Born: ca. 1965; Tokyo, Japan
- Disappeared: September 6, 2003; Tokyo, Japan
- Died: Tokyo Bay
- Cause of death: Murder by beating, stabbing and drowning
- Body discovered: September 12, 2003
- Other name: Kuragaki Kashiwabara (柏原蔵書)
- Occupation: Freelance crime journalist
- Notable work: Kagi no Seisho and Kabukichō Underground

Satoru Someya (ca. 1965 – 6 September 2003), who was a Japanese freelance journalist reporting on organized crime in Kabukichō, Tokyo, Japan, under the pen name Kuragaki Kashiwabara, was kidnapped and murdered in retaliation for his reporting about locksmiths and their involvement in thefts and for refusing to apologize to one of the subjects in a book before the fatal crime. He is the only journalist listed as confirmed by the Committee to Protect Journalists to be killed in Japan for his journalism.

== Personal ==
Satoru Someya was born in Japan around 1965.

== Career ==
Satoru Someya was a freelance journalist who wrote books and articles about crime in the Tokyo Bay area. His work appeared in a number of Japanese magazines under his pen name Kuragaki Kashiwabara.

In his book "The Key Bible" (Japanese: "Kagi no Seisho"), he wrote about locksmiths and thefts and noted that his investigations might put his life in danger.

Someya also published a book called Kabukichō Underground about his investigation into the different Chinese criminal groups operating in Kabukichō, Japan.

== Death ==
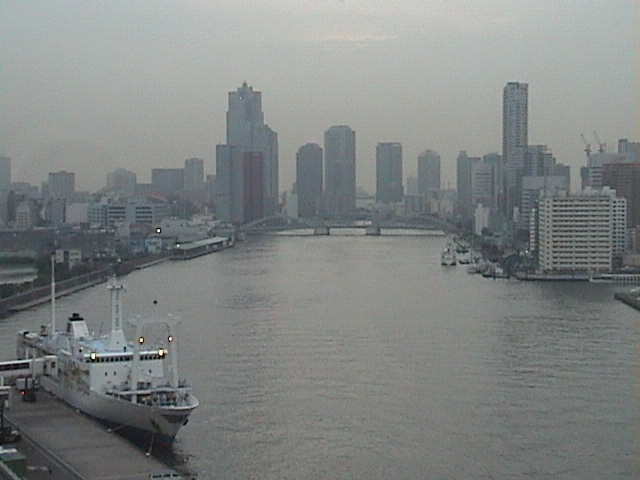
A landscape of Tokyo Bay.

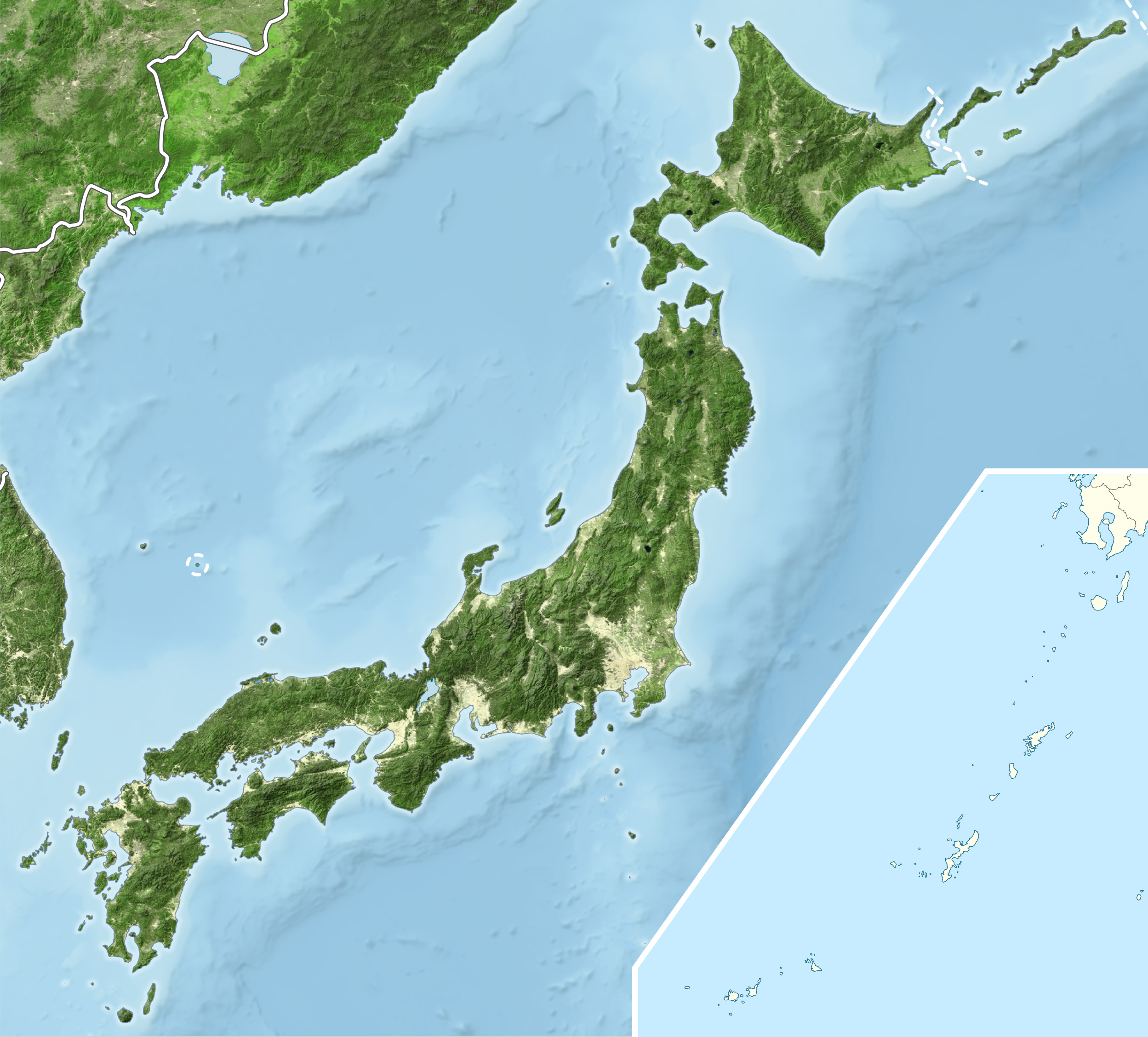
Tokyo is the capital of Japan.

Satoru Someya's last known contact before his kidnapping was on the night of 5 September 2003, when he had a telephone conversation with a magazine editor. Tokyo police reported Someya had financial trouble and owed money to several organizations.

Keizo Sakurai, a locksmith who was also known as Takeshi Kihara, and two accomplices, Yoshihiro Kumamoto and Ryoichi Fuji, kidnapped Someya from his Tokyo Bay apartment and held him captive. According to police reports, Someya owed money to Sakurai. Sakurai confessed to journalist's murder on 27 April 2004. He told police Kumamoto held Someya in his apartment trying to force an apology from Someya about his portrayal of Sakurai in his book "Kabukichō Underground." Someya reportedly refused to apologize. Sakurai, Kumamoto, and Fuji placed Someya on a boat and sailed him to Tokyo Bay, where they stabbed him several times and dumped his body. Someya's body was discovered on 12 September, wrapped in a weighted chain with his hands tied with rope and eight stab wounds in his back according to Japanese police reports.

All three men were charged with murder 16 January 2004. On 1 March 2005, Keizo Sakurai was sentenced to an 18-year prison term after pleading guilty to charges. On 11 October 2005, Yoshihiro Kumamoto was sentenced to 14 years in prison for the murder and kidnapping of Someya.

== Context ==
The murder of Japanese journalists is extremely rare. The last reported murder of a journalist in Japan was Tomohiro Kojiri - a reporter for Asahi Shimbun - was shot and killed on 3 May 1987 at Shimbun newspaper offices near Kobe, Japan.

== Impact ==
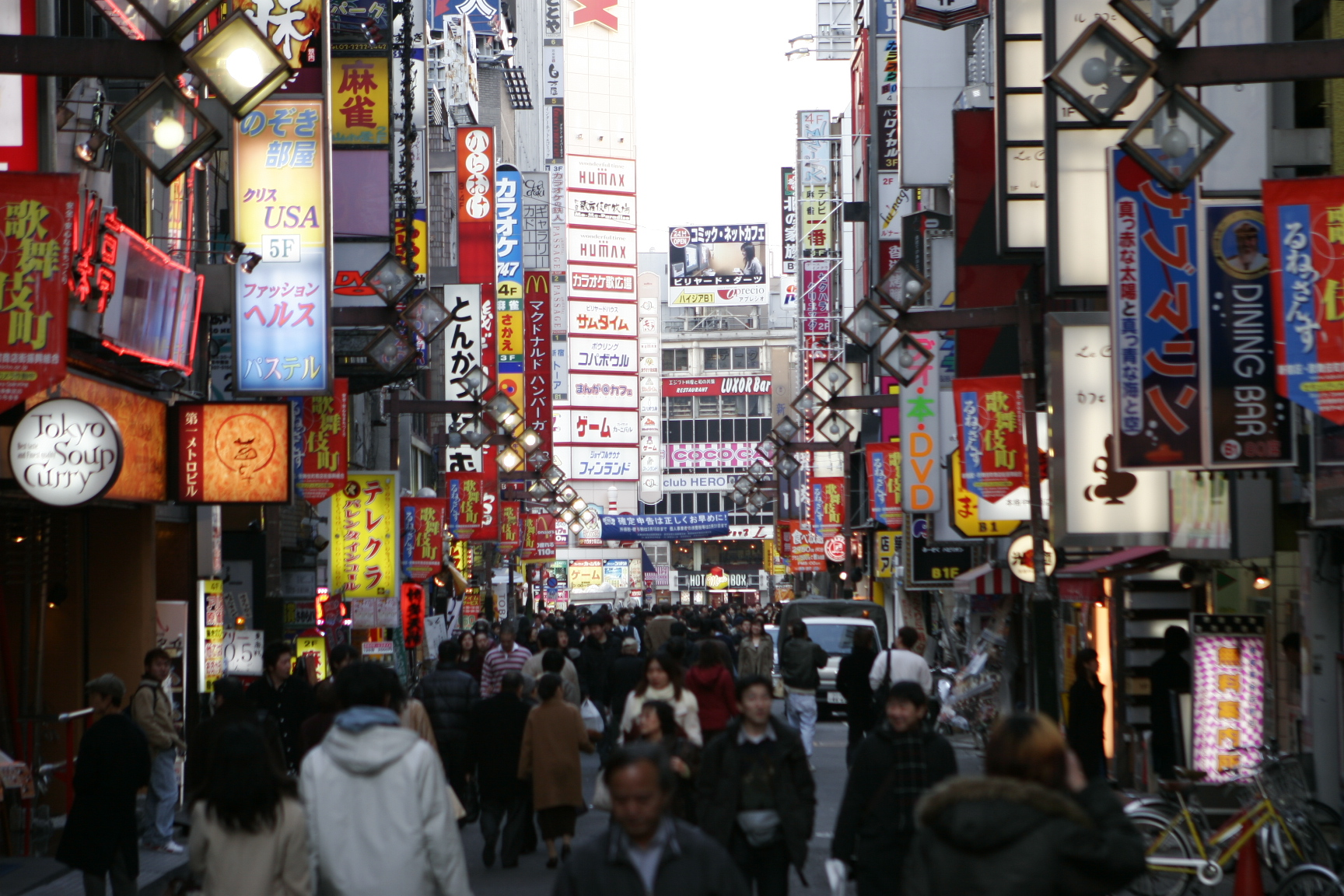
The Kabukichō red light and entertainment district of Tokyo.

Someya's books, Kagi no Seisho and Kabukicho Underground, both became best sellers in the Japanese market.

The murder of Someya created a public concern over the recent burglaries and murders of citizens in the Tokyo Bay area. The reports from his book Kagi no Seisho showed that over 11,000 homes in Tokyo have had their lock's picked in the year of 2003 which was an increase of eighty-one percent from 2002.

== Reactions ==
Japanese journalist murders are extremely rare, according to the Committee to Protect Journalists, which investigated the murder and its relation to Someya's journalism.

Someya wrote that he was in danger in the postscript to his last book Kabukichō Underground.

His murderer Keizo Sakurai made the following statement in his guilty plea, "If I did not kill him, I would still have been a victim of false accusations by the dirty writer and would have suffered social ostracism. I could not help but kill him." Sakurai had been mentioned in both of Someya's books.

In pushing for a lengthy sentence, prosecutors said, "The crime is extremely cruel and brutal, taking time in killing (Someya) to make him feel the horror of death for a long time."

== Books ==
- Kabukichō Underground (2003) (ISBN 978-4584159651)
- The Key Bible (Japanese: Kagi no Seisho) (2002)

== See also ==
- 2003 in Japan
- Yakuza
