= Sagara Sōzō =

Samurai (1839–1868)

Sagara Sozo
- 相楽 総三
- Born: Kojima Shirō (小島 四郎); 1839; Akasaka, Edo, Japan
- Died: March 26, 1868 (aged 28–29); Shimosuwa, Nagano Prefecture, Japan
- Burial place: Aoyama Cemetery, Akasaka, Tokyo, Japan
- Spouse: Watanabe Teru (m. 1864)
- Children: Kimura Kawajirō (son)
- Relatives: Kojima Hyoma (father); Kojima Yasu (mother)
- Military career
- Allegiance: Government of Meiji Japan
- Branch: Sekihōtai
- Service years: 1868
- Commands: Sekihōtai 1st Unit
- Memorials: Monument to the memory of Sagara Sōzō Sagara-zuka Monument, Shimosuwa, Nagano Prefecture, Japan

Sagara Sōzō (相楽 総三 1839 – March 26, 1868), real name Kojima Shirō (小島 四郎), was the leader of the 1st Unit of the Sekihōtai, a group of Japanese political extremists formed in 1868 during the Boshin War.

== History ==
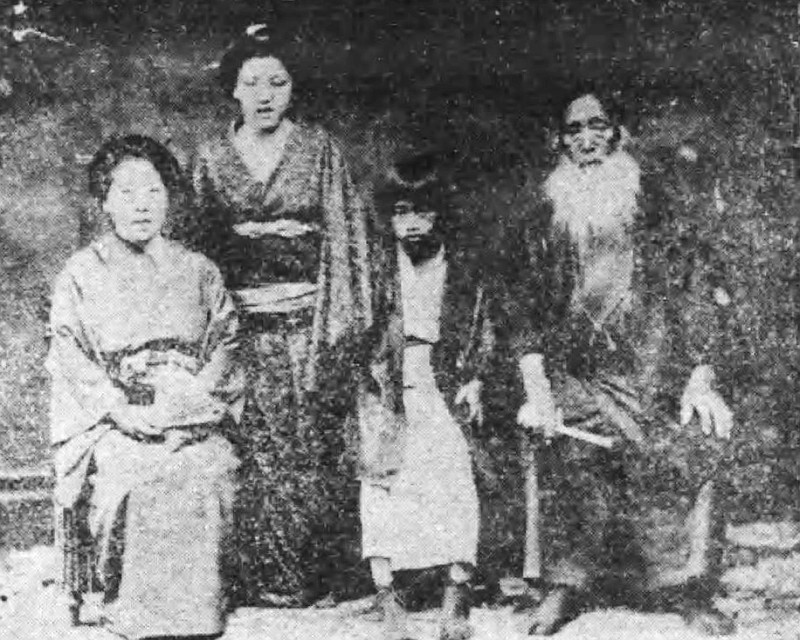
Sagara's family, taken five or six years after his death; from left: his sister, his niece, his son, and his father

He was born Kojima Shirō in Akasaka, Edo in 1839 as the fourth son to the wealthy father Kojima Hyoma and his wife Yasu.

He married Watanabe Teru, the daughter of the retainer of the Matsudaira clan in 1864 (Genji 1). Their son, Kawajirō, was born in 1865 (Genji 2) whom he was happy with and thought his newly born son was a gift of the divinity of Hikawa Shrine.

After the Battle of Toba–Fushimi in 1868, the Sekihōtai, in which Sagara was the leader of the 1st Unit, constituted of a civilian squad made principally of farmers and merchants, was formed on February 1, 1868, at Kongōrin-ji temple in Matsuoji, Ōmi Province with the support of Saigō Takamori and Iwakura Tomomi. The group promised a reduction in taxes to the people who supported it, a move which was initially backed by the new government. The new government would later find that they were unable to fulfill the promise due to financial reasons.

When Sagara was asked to return to his headquarters by the Satchōdo command, Sagara decided not to because he believed it would be too soon. This, along with a number of previous unsanctioned actions, led to the Satchōdo forces turning on his unit. Moreover, the new government, needing a scapegoat for their inability to fulfill the tax reduction promise, declared Sekihōtai to be a fake army misusing the government's name for their campaign. Sagara, along with seven more officers, were arrested on March 24, 1868, by a force under the staff officer Shindō Tatewaki. Sagara had to watch his officers being executed by decapitation one by one before he himself was decapitated at Shimosuwa Station, Nagano Prefecture on March 26, 1868. Their heads were put for display the next morning.

His wife Teru, upon hearing the news, entrusted her son Kawajirō to Sagara's elder sister (married into Kimura family), and committed suicide soon afterwards. Sagara and his wife were buried on a temple ground in Akasaka. While on display, Sagara's head was later stolen by his close friend and a kokugaku scholar Iida Takesato and was secretly buried.

After their original burial ground at the temple was no longer being kept up, their graves were reburied at Aoyama Cemetery, Akasaka, Tokyo, Japan by the Kimura family.

== Legacy ==
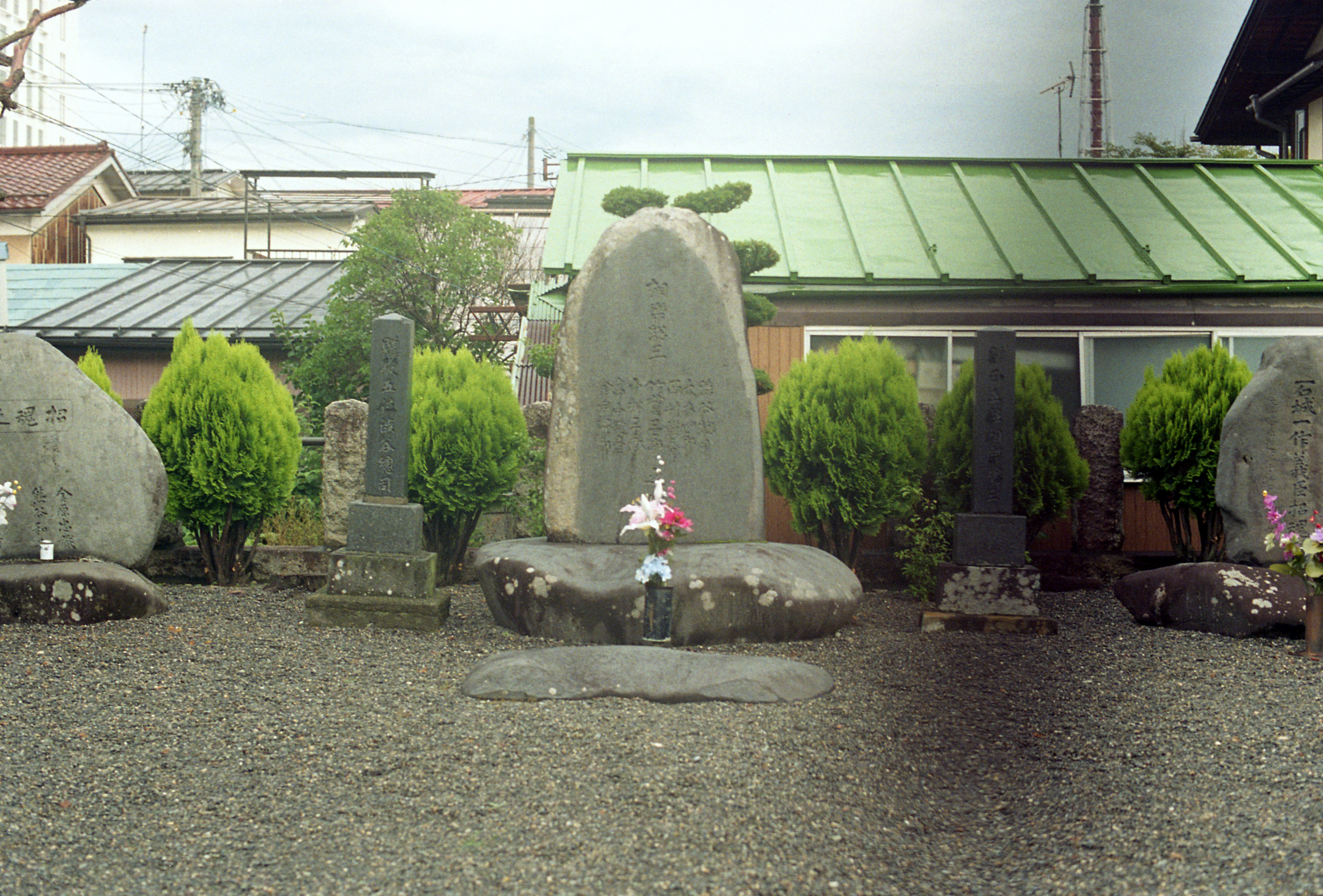
The Sagara-zuka monument, 2017

=== Monument ===
The Monument to the Memory of Sagara Sōzō or the Sagara-zuka monument was unveiled by Ochiai Naoaki in 1870.

=== Sagara Festival ===
In 1918, Sagara's grandson Kametarō Kimura (木村 亀太郎, Kimura Kametarō) received cooperation from volunteers in Shimosuwa and revived the memorial festival for Sagara and his unit.

=== Enshrinement ===
In 1928, Kimura had since restored his honor and Sagara was enshrined in Yasukuni Shrine, Tokyo by 1929.

== In popular culture ==
In the 1969 film Red Lion, he was portrayed by Takahiro Tamura.

Sagara is portrayed in the manga and anime series Rurouni Kenshin, where he is the mentor of Sagara Sanosuke, a fictional character.

The character DJ Sagara of Kamen Rider Gaim is named for Sagara Sōzō.
