= Reol (singer) =

Japanese singer

- Born: November 9, 1993 (age 32); Nagano Prefecture, Japan
- Genres: J-pop; EDM
- Occupations: Singer; songwriter; record producer
- Years active: 2012–present
- Labels: Toy's Factory; Victor; NeoFront
- Formerly of: REOL
- Website: reol.jp

Reol (れをる, Reworu; born November 9, 1993) is a Japanese singer, songwriter, and record producer. She began creating and releasing music onto Nico Nico Douga and YouTube in 2012, achieving recognition for writing and performing viral Vocaloid songs. She released the album Gokusaishiki independently, which reached the top ten on the Oricon Albums Chart.

Reol signed with the record label Toy's Factory in 2015, and in 2016, she formed the J-pop group REOL, composed of her long-time collaborators Giga and Okiku, where she served as both its namesake and lead vocalist. Their debut album, Sigma, was released the same year to widespread success and acclaim, peaking at 6 on the Oricon Albums Chart, and 9 on the Billboard Japan Hot 100. In 2017, the group announced they intended to disband, and after their final live performance, they released the extended play Endless EP before officially disbanding.

Following the disbandment of REOL, Reol signed with Victor Entertainment in 2018, resuming her career as a solo artist and releasing the album Jijitsujo that same year. Giga still frequently collaborates with her as a producer, and Okiku has continued to contribute to live visuals and some music videos. Her following singles have received general commercial and viral success, and with both her rise to solo prominence and the release of her 2020 album Kinjitou, she was the first Japanese performer to be named "Artist on the Rise" by YouTube in 2020.

== Career ==
In late 2012, Reol began uploading original songs and cover songs to video sharing sites Nico Nico Douga and YouTube. On August 17, 2014, Reol co-released two compilation albums, titled No Title+ and No Title-, with music arranger Giga, video director Okiku, and art producer Mochizuki Kei, under the group name Anyosupenyosuyaya. The album contains vocals by Vocaloid virtual singers such as Hatsune Miku, GUMI and Megurine Luka, the album was released through Japanese label Celo Project. In 2014, Reol released the single "LUVORATORRRRRY!" in collaboration with Nqrse, Giga and Okiku. The music video for the song has amassed over 80 million views on YouTube, making it their most popular release.

On July 29, 2015, Reol independently released her first studio album titled Gokusaishiki, which reached the top ten on the Oricon Albums Chart. Later in 2015, Reol, along with Giga & Okiku, signed with Toy's Factory under the unit name REOL. On August 18, REOL made their first public appearance in the music video for their single "Give me a break Stop now". They released their debut studio album titled 'Sigma' on October 19, 2016, which reached number 8 on the Oricon weekly Albums Chart. In August 2017, REOL announced that they would be disbanding after their last live performances. On October 11, 2017, REOL released their final project, which was an EP entitled Endless EP.

In January 2018, Reol signed to Victor Entertainment. On March 5 she released a music video for the song titled "エンド" as the single for her solo debut EP. Reol released her first EP titled Kyokoushu on March 14. Reol released the singles "Saisaki" and "Sairen" in July and August respectively before the announcement of her first studio album Jijitsujo. Jijitsujo was released on October 17, and a music video for the third single "Gekihaku" was released on December 19. Reol was featured on TeddyLoid's Silent Planet:Infinity album on the song "Winners". Reol later went on her first tour dubbed "MADE IN FACTION" around Japan, and later into China.

In 2019, she released the Bunmei EP on March 20, and music videos for "Utena" and "Lost Paradise" respectively. She has gone on her second Japanese tour, named "Reol Secret Live". "Phanto(me)" was released on July 24, 2019, as a single.

On January 22, 2020, Reol released her second full album Kinjitou. The album has a total of 11 songs and includes the digital singles: Phanto(me), HYPE MODE, and 1LDK. On September 27, 2020, she, as the first Japanese female artist, was elected in "Artist on the Rise". On July 29, the music video for "The Sixth Sense" was released, a promotional song for Boat Race 2020, which also featured the group Tokyo Gegegay, who also sang in the YouTube version. On November 4, she released a music video titled "Q?", in collaboration with Giga.

In October 2021, she released her extended play Dai Rokkan, which additionally featured "The Sixth Sense".

In May 2022, Reol signed to Sony Music Japan.

== Discography ==
With REOL

- Sigma (2016)

=== Albums ===
Studio albums

List of studio albums, with selected details and chart positions
Year	Title	Peak position		Notes
Year	Title	JPN (Oricon)	US World	Notes
2014	No Title-	—	—	
2014	No Title+	—	—	Vocaloid reissue
2015	Gokusaishiki	6	—	As れをる (Reworu)
2018	Jijitsujo	5	9	
2020	Kinjitou	11	—	
2021	Dai Rokkan	12	—	
2023	Black Box	17	—	
2026	Bijigaku	21	—	

Live albums

List of live albums, with selected details and chart positions
Year	Title	Peak position
Year	Title	JPN (Oricon)
2025	"No Title" in Nippon Budokan	37

Video albums

List of video albums, with selected details and chart positions
Year	Title	Peak position	
Year	Title	JPN DVD	JPN Blu-ray
2020	Reol Japan Tour 2020 A Great Order of Hameln -Interlinked-	27	25
2024	Reol Oneman Live 2023/24 "UNBOX" black	15	8
2025	Reol Oneman Live 'No title' in NIPPON BUDOKAN	7	4

=== Extended plays ===
List of extended plays, with chart positions
Year	Title	Peak position	
Year	Title	JPN (Oricon)	US World
2018	Kyoko Shu	3	—
2019	Bunmei	3	13
2024	Hisokuroku	20	—

=== Singles ===
Year	Title	Notes
2018	Heimenkyou	
2018	Saisaki	
2018	Sairen	Ending theme of Major 2nd
2019	Lost Paradise	
2019	Phanto(me)	
2019	Hype Mode	
2020	1LDK	
2020	The Sixth Sense	
2020	Q?	Ending theme of Digimon Adventure
2021	White Midnight	Theme song of Alchemy Stars
2021	Boy	
2022	Naked	
2022	Agitate	
2022	No Title (Seaside Remix) (with Nuyuri)	Remix reissue
2022	Scorpion	Theme song for Riot Games
2022	Colored Disc	
2023	Glitter	
2023	Edge	Ending theme of Rurouni Kenshin -Meiji Kenkaku Roman Tan-
2023	Carousel of Imaginary Images (虚像のCarousel) (with Mori Calliope)	
2023	The Sixth Sense - From The First Take	Reissue
2023	DDD	
2024	Want U Luv It	Theme song of "WcDonald's" for McDonald's campaign
2024	Dear	
2024	Ultra C (with nqrse)	
2024	Re Rescue	Opening theme of Blue Exorcist: Beyond the Snow Saga
2024	No Dazzle, No Break	Character song for Honkai: Star Rail
2024	Shinobi	C Honkai: Star Rail
2025	Redire	
2025	OoedoRanvu -10th Edition- (with nqrse)	

== Bibliography ==
- 2025: Reol Oneman Live「No title」Special Photo Book
