= Ōhara Shigetomi =

- 大原 重徳
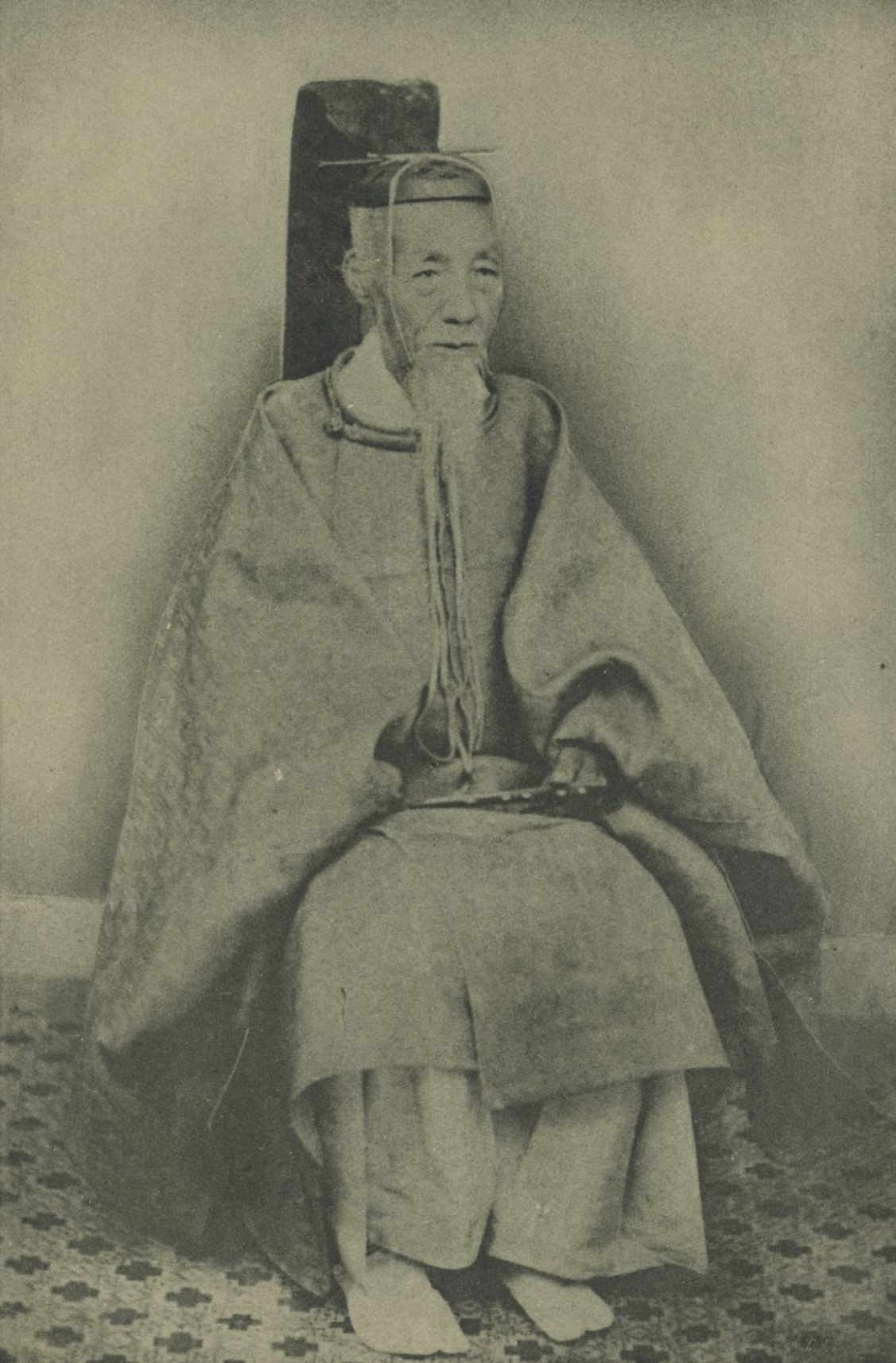

Personal details
- Born: November 21, 1801 Yamashiro Province, Japan
- Died: April 1, 1879 (aged 77) Kyoto, Japan

Ōhara Shigetomi (Japanese: 大原 重徳; 1801–1879) was a Japanese nobleman.

== Biography ==
In 1858, Ōhara was enraged upon hearing of plans to accept the Treaty of Amity and Commerce under coercion from the United States. When Hotta Masayoshi travelled to Kyoto to seek authorization from Emperor Kōmei to sign the treaty, Ōhara was one of 88 noblemen who jointly advised against agreeing to any American demands. For this, he was sentenced to house arrest before being pardoned a year later. In 1862, Ōhara travelled to Edo accompanied by a force of Satsuma samurai as an envoy of the Imperial Court.

Ōhara was one of the most fervent nationalists among the aristocracy, and intensely detested all things foreign. He was a follower of the Shintō teachings of Hirata Atsutane.

Ōhara later served in various administrative roles within the Great Council of State before his retirement in 1870. He died in 1879.
