= List of Buso Renkin characters =

The Buso Renkin anime and manga series features an extensive cast of characters created by Nobuhiro Watsuki. The series takes place in the fictional Ginsei City, Japan, where a boy named Koshaku Chouno is creating alchemical monsters known as homunculi. During a night, Kazuki Muto, an ordinary boy, is killed by a homunculus, while trying to save Tokiko Tsumura. Feeling guilty, Tokiko, a member of the Alchemist Army, revives him by replacing his heart with an alchemical device called kakugane. The kakugane allows its wielder to form a buso renkin, a special weapon that is the only thing that can destroy a homunculus. With his own buso renkin, Kazuki decides to join Tokiko in the fight against the homunculi. Over the course of the series, they also must to defeat the L.X.E, a group consisting of human-type homunculi, as well as Victor, an entity most powerful than the homunculi.

While developing the series, Watsuki was influenced by his previous works, mostly by Rurouni Kenshin from which he drew references to the main characters; Kazuki and Tokiko were conceptualized after Makimachi Misao and Himura Kenshin, respectively. Films such as The League of Extraordinary Gentlemen and Brotherhood of the Wolf also served as source of inspiration, as well as American comics. Reviewers called the characters generic and also criticized their designs. The main characters divided critics' opinion; Kazuki and Papillon have received both praise and criticism, while most of praise was towards Tokiko, who also was voted as the most popular character of the series by readers.

== Creation and conception ==
Watsuki based Buso Renkin's characters and fictional elements on his previous works. He conceptualized Kazuki while imagining Makimachi Misao, (Note: Viz Media misspelled "Makimachi Misao" as "Misao Harumachi".^{[ch. 1]}) and Tokiko was designed as a feminized version of Himura Kenshin from Rurouni Kenshin.^{[ch. 3]} From the same series, Yukishiro Enishi and Yukishiro Tomoe served as inspiration for the Hayasaka twins;^{[ch. 36]} Inui Banjin and Otowa Hyōko for the homunculi Kinjo^{[ch. 22]} and Jinnai.^{[ch. 24]} Shusui Hayasaka's buso renkin, "Sword Samurai X", refers to the English name of Rurouni Kenshin.^{[ch. 48]} Watsuki declared that Buster Baron is a "reincarnation" of the Armor Baron from Gun Blaze West.^{Period} In addition, Victor's buso renkin is named after the X-Men storyline of the same name.^{Period}

Watsuki has drawn many references from films. He choose the Kazuki's weapon as a lance because he watched A Knight's Tale, and thought it was "cool".^{[ch. 27]} Brotherhood of the Wolf served as the inspiration for Silver Skin, which is based on the main characters' outfit,^{[ch. 31]} and for Victor, which is based on a Native American.^{[ch. 46]} Moonface's replication ability is based in Matrix's Agent Smith.^{[ch. 45]} The name "League of Extraordinary Elects" was based on The League of Extraordinary Gentlemen.^{[ch. 26]} The submarine buso renkin was inspired by the Nautilus from Jules Verne's Twenty Thousand Leagues Under the Seas.^{Finale} The term for the human followers of the homunculi, "familiars", comes from the human disciples of the vampires in Blade.^{[ch. 36]} Gekisen, the buso renkin of Genji Ikusabe was based on Hollow Man.^{[ch. 63]}

== Characters ==
=== Main characters ===
Kazuki Muto (武藤カズキ, Mutō Kazuki)
Voiced by: Jun Fukuyama (Japanese); Steve Staley (English)
A 16-year-old boy who was killed by a Homunculi when trying to save Tokiko Tsumura. When Tokiko replaces his heart with a Buso Renkin to revive him^{[ch. 1]}, he decides to help in the fight against the Homunculi^{[ch. 2]} and is later asked to be an Alchemist Warrior by Captain Bravo^{[ch. 18]}, which he accepts due to his will to protect his sister Mahiro and his friends.^{[ch. 20]} His Buso Renkin is "Sunlight Heart" (サンライトハート, Sanraito Hāto), a spear-lance with a cloth that can turn into energy for either propulsion or as a blinding light.^{[ch. 27]}
Tokiko Tsumura (津村斗貴子, Tsumura Tokiko)
Voiced by: Ryōka Yuzuki (Japanese); Tara Platt (English)
A 17-year-old Alchemic Warrior. Seven year prior the series events, Tokiko's entire school was massacred by a Homunculi with only her surviving when Mamoru Sakimori came to the rescue.^{[ch. 72]} Due to the trauma of the event, she's extremely serious almost all the time. The incident also left her with a scar across the bridge of her nose which, although it could've been removed using alchemy, Tokiko decides to keep it as a reminder of her will to fight.^{Period} Her Buso Renkin is "Valkyrie Skirt" (バルキリースカート, Barukirī Sukāto), a set of bladed spider-like legs attached to her thighs controlled using her synapses.^{[ch. 29]}
Koushaku Chouno (蝶野攻爵, Chōno Kōshaku)
Voiced by: Mitsuaki Madono (Japanese); Spike Spencer (English)
A 19-year-old genius student, Chouno suffered from an unspecified disease but managed to save himself after learning how to make Homunculi through research notes left by his great-great-grandfather, initially experimenting with various animals.^{[ch. 8, 9]} Later, he turns himself into a Human-type Homunculus and renames himself "Papillon" (パピヨン, Papiyon). He proceeds to murder his entire family, but is subsequently killed by Kazuki.^{[ch. 16, 17]} He's later revived by L.X.E.^{[ch. 18]} and wishes to fight Kazuki again, but is prevented from doing so when his illness reemerges^{[ch. 20]}. Papillon then joins forces with Kazuki when he's being hunted by the Re-Extermination Squad^{[ch. 58]} and, in order to prevent his foe's death, re-creates the White Kakugane using Alexandra Powered's research. He and Kazuki finally have their showdown, which Papillon ultimately loses, but Kazuki refuses to kill him again.^{Period} His Buso Renkin is "Near-Death Happiness" (ニアデス・ハピネス, Niadesu Hapinesu), a mass of black gunpowder that he can manipulate to assume any form (usually a pair of butterfly wings) as well as remotely detonate at will.^{[ch. 51]}

=== The Alchemist Army ===
In the manga, with the exceptions of Kazuki and the Hayasaka Twins, all members of the Alchemist Army (including Tokiko) have their names annotated exclusively with katakana (e.g. 火(ヒ)渡(ワタリ)赤(セキ)馬(マ)), while all other characters have theirs regularly with hiragana. Tokiko's family name, Tsumura, was annotated with hiragana (as 津(つ)村(むら)) for the first two volumes, however.

Captain Bravo (キャプテン ブラボー, Kyaputen Burabō)
Voiced by: Masashi Ebara (Japanese); Patrick Seitz (English)
Real name is Mamoru Sakimori (防人衛, Sakimori Mamoru), Captain Bravo is Tokiko's commanding officer and a veteran Alchemic Warrior. He abandons his name after the incident as Tokiko's old school, feeling ashamed of himself for being unable to save more than one person.^{[ch. 53, 72]} After receiving orders from the Alchemist Army, he attempts to kill Kazuki twice, failing during his first attempt^{[ch. 51, 69]} and later defending Kazuki from Sekima Hiwatari, using his Buso Renkin to protect both of them.^{[ch. 72]} His Buso Renkin is Silver Skin (シルバー・スキン, Shirubā Sukin), a protective outfit that covers his entire body, except for his eyes, and is capable of hardening into a special form of regenerating metal when struck.^{[ch. 21]}
Gouta Nakamura (中村剛太, Nakamura Gōta)
Voiced by: Shinji Kawada (Japanese); Liam O'Brien (English)
A rookie Alchemic Warriors. Prior to the series start, he trained with Tokiko,^{[ch. 55]} developing a devotion to her.^{[ch. 70]} At first, he's jealous of the relationship Kazuki has with Tokiko, but slowly grows to admire him^{[ch. 63]}, eventually declaring him his "rivals in love".^{[ch. 79]} He cooperates with Kazuki and Tokiko as they try to escape from the Re-Extermination Squad, despite being first designate for this team.^{[ch. 50, 56]} He also help Tokiko in their last mission to defeat Papillon.^{Period} His Buso Renkin Motor Gear (モーターギア, Mōtā Gia) is a pair of gear-shaped chakrams that have a variety of applications, ranging from use as close-to-long range weaponry to increased mobility for Gota himself.^{[ch. 56]}
Sekima Hiwatari (火渡赤馬, Hiwatari Sekima)
Voiced by: Tomokazu Seki (Japanese); Kyle Hebert (English)
An Alchemic Warrior Chief and Captain Bravo's former teammates, he was there during the failed mission to stop a group of Homunculi from killing an entire school alongside Shosei Sakaguchi and Chitose Hateyama.^{[ch. 72, 74]} Hiwatari is the leader of the Re-Extermination Squad, a team commissioned to kill Kazuki, and is composed of himself and six other subordinate Alchemic Warriors.^{[ch. 55, 68]} Hiwatari's Buso Renkin is Blaze of Glory (ブレイズオブグローリー, Bureizu Obu Gurōrī), a napalm bomb that allows him to manipulate flames.^{[ch. 76]}
Shosei Sakaguchi (坂口照星, Sakaguchi Shōsei)
Voiced by: Show Hayami (Japanese); David Paulson (English)
The Great Warrior Chief of the Alchemist Army's Asian Branch and Captain Bravo's former teammates, he was there during the failed mission to stop a group of Homunculi from killing an entire school and Chitose Hateyama.^{[ch. 72, 74]} He prevents Hiwatari from killing Kazuki, proclaiming that defeating Victor is the Alchemist Army's priority.^{[ch. 73]} Shosei's Buso Renkin is Buster Baron (バスターバロン, Basutā Baron), a gigantic knight-like robot that can materialize a large-scale version of any Buso Renkin manifested inside it.^{Finale}

=== Re-Extermination Squad ===
The Re-Extermination Squad is a team led by Sekima Hiwatari and commissioned to kill Kazuki.

Chitose Hateyama (楯山 千歳, Tateyama Chitose)
Another of Captain Bravo's former teammates, her Buso Renkin is called "Hermes Drive" (ヘルメスドライブ, Herumesu Doraibu), a radar that also enables her to teleport objects.
Hanaka Busujima (毒島華花, Busujima Hanaka)
A shy girl whose buso renkin, "Aerial Operator" (エアリアル オペレーター, Eariaru Operētā), is a gas mask capable of mixing all gas-type elements into either poisonous or explosive mixtures.
Genji Ikusabe (戦部 厳至, Ikusabe Genji)
A combative man whose Buso Renkin, "Gekisen" (激戦), is a spear that heals any wound it's wielder suffers^{[ch. 64]}.
Madoka Maruyama (円山 円, Maruyama Madoka)
An androgynous boy, his Buso Renkin is called "Bubble Cage" (バブルケイジ, Baburu Keiji), in the manga its a belt which can fire out balloons that shrink and seal people inside them^{[ch. 59,67]}, while in the anime, they multiply themselves when destroyed.
Shinobu Negoro (根来 忍, Negoro Shinobu)
A quite yet stern man whose Buso Renkin, "Secret Trail" (シークレットトレイル, Shīkuretto Toreiru), is a ninjatō that creates pathways to another dimension when it cuts a solid object;^{[ch. 74]}
Rintarou Inukai (犬飼 倫太郎, Inukai Rintarou)
A man whose Buso Renkin, "Killer Rabies" (キラーレイビーズ, Kirā Reibīzu), summons a flute which commands a pair of mechanical military dogs.^{[ch. 59]}

=== L.X.E ===
Doktor (Note: Watsuki uses the German word "Doktor" for his name.^{[ch. 44]}) Butterfly (ドクトルバタフライ, Dokutoru Batafurai)
Voiced by: Katsumi Chō (Japanese); David Lodge (English)
Real name Bakushaku Chouno (蝶野 爆爵, Chōno Bakushaku), Doktor Butterfly is Koshaku's great-great-grandfather as well as the non-declared leader of the League of Extraordinary Elects (or "L.X.E." or short), a group of Human-type Homunculus. Apart from Papillon, he's the only person shown to have the skill required to create Homunculi^{[ch. 35]}. However, despite this fact, Doktor Butterfly attributes the leadership of the L.X.E. to Victor.^{[ch. 18]} His vast knowledge of alchemy comes directly from Victor himself, who, in exchange of teaching him, requested his assistance in healing himself.^{[ch. 43]} His Buso Renkin is known as Alice in Wonderland (アリス・イン・ワンダーランド, Arisu in Wandārando), a platinum-white colored chaff with different abilities based on whether its in its scattered or concentrated forms: In its scattered form, it has the ability to confuse a target's ability to determine things like direction and distance in addition to jamming electronics; meanwhile, in its concentrated form, it's capable of inducing hallucinations through simply looking at it.^{[ch. 52]}
Moonface (ムーンフェイス, Mūnfeisu)
Voiced by: Tomokazu Seki (Japanese); Christopher Corey Smith (English)
His real name is Lunare Nikoleav (ルナール・ニコラエフ, Runāru Nikoraefu)^{[ch. 36]} and is the closest L.X.E. member to Dr. Butterfly. He finds the Hayasaka twins while walking along with Butterfly and is always talking to him.^{[ch. 18, 32]} He is a moon-shaped-head man who possesses Satellite 30 (サテライト30, Sateraito 30), a Buso Renkin that allows him to create up to 30 slightly different copies of himself (in imitation of the 30 different phases of the moon).^{[ch. 40]}
Victor Powered (ヴィクター・パワード, Bikutā Pawādo)
Voiced by: Rikiya Koyama (Japanese); Yuri Lowenthal (English)
The former leader of the Alchemist Army and is the main antagonist of the series. A century prior to the series' events, he is severely injured by a homunculus, and his wife, Alexandria, creates the Black Kakugane to revive him. However, Victor loses his self-control and kills everyone in the lab, as well as injuring his wife, who becomes a brain in a vat. He escapes from both the Alchemist Army and the homunculi led by his daughter Victoria, who is forced to become a homunculus, and goes to Japan.^{[ch. 78, Finale]} There he is healed by Doktor Butterfly.^{[ch. 44]} Victor's Buso Renkin is Fatal Attraction (フェイタルアトラクション, Feitaru Atorakushon), a gigantic battle axe that's capable of manipulating gravity.^{Period}

=== The Hayasaka Twins ===
Twins who're members of the L.X.E., the Hayasaka's were kidnapped as children and abused inside of an apartment room by a woman they believed to be their mother. When she eventually died, they were taken to a hospital by the police but soon learned their birth parents didn't want them, leading the pair to run away and live on the street until they were found by the L.X.E. and taken in as "familiars".^{[ch. 32]} In exchange for their services, the twins asked to be turned into Homunculi themselves so they could stay together for eternity.^{[ch. 31]} Armed with Kakugane provided by the L.X.E., they fought against Kazuki and Tokio but were defeated and nearly killed by the latter before she was intersected by Kazuki. Following the fall of the L.X.E., Ouka and Shusui would team up with Papillon in order to keep Kazuki alive^{[ch. 54]} and later help in the fight against Victor^{[ch. Finale]} as well as joining forces with the Alchemist Army in the last mission to defeat Papillon.^{Period}

Ouka Hayasaka (早坂桜花, Hayasaka Ōka)
Voiced by: Hitomi Nabatame (Japanese); Cindy Robinson (English)
Ouka's Buso Renkin is Angel Gozen (エンゼル御前, Enzeru Gozen), which consists of an autonomous robot named "Gozen", a bow and a gauntlet; the latter is capable of creating, loading and firing arrows for the user as well as producing a special arrow which can heal target's injury by absorbing and transfer them to wielder.^{[ch. 49]}
Shusui Hayasaka (早坂秋水, Hayasaka Shusui)
Voiced by: Kishō Taniyama (Japanese); Bryce Papenbrook (English)
Shusui is a kendo master^{[ch. 25]}, and his Buso Renkin is known as Sword Samurai X (ソードサムライX, Sōdo Samurai X), a katana with a long cord attached to the pommel which is capable of absorbing and releasing energy.^{[ch. 29]}

=== Other characters ===
Mahiro Muto (武藤 まひろ, Mutō Mahiro)
Kazuki's sister.
Alexandria (アレキサンドリア, Arekisandoria)
Victor's wife a century ago, who creates a black kakugane to revive her husband after he's severely injured by a homunculus. However, she ends up as a brain in a vat after being injured by Victor.
Victoria (ヴィクトリア, Bikutoria)
Voiced by: Rie Kugimiya (Japanese); G.K. Bowes (English)
Victor's daughter a century ago, who was forced to become a homunculus and chases after him.
Soya Muto (武藤ソウヤ, Mutō Sōya)
Voiced by: Hiroaki Miura
A character from the PlayStation 2 video game Buso Renkin: Yōkoso Papillon Park e. He is Kazuki and Tokiko's son, who as a teenager travels back in time to stop a plot by Moonface. His buso renkin is Lightning Pale Rider (ライトニングペイルライダー, Raitoningu Peiru Raidā), a trident-like buso renkin.

== Reception ==
Leigh Dragoon of Sequential Tart qualified the characters as "completely forgettable" and said they lack of personality, citing Mahiro "could be portrayed as a piece of paper". Dragoon said Kazuki "seems like a direct lift from 3×3 Eyes's Yakumo [Fujii]", and Tokiko and "Rei Ayanami without the interesting attached", respectively. Similarly, Michael Aronson from Manga Life stated "all [the characters] fit familiar roles". Later, Aronson named the character's dialogue as the series "strongest suit", but criticized how Kazuki and Tokiko "only act as bland foils". Carl Kimlinger of Anime News Network (ANN) qualified Kazuki "a non-entity", and the remaining characters "human-shaped gags". Writing for ANN, Luke Carroll said the character designs are "a rather uninspired affair". Kimlinger said the designs are "so generic that they'd shame a dating sim". A reviewer of The Star declared "the manga's antagonists are quite weak and one-dimensional" and that it is "difficult to take Papillon Mask seriously." In the same vein, Carlo Santos of ANN criticized the designs, mainly the villains who "slides right down into lame", saying "who would even want to cosplay Papillon?", and comparing Moonface to a scary McDonald's campaign. The "overblown" villains "soon start to become old hat" and "irritating", according to UK Anime Network's Andy Hanley. Although praised Papillon's backhistory, Mania's Chris Beveridge criticized his design and called him "a very quirky and weird character".

Conversely, Patti Martinson wrote for Sequential Tart that the characters "are distinctive and interesting", and The Star reviewer called the character Buso Renkin's "saving grace". Kazuki was said to be a "very likeable hero" by Active Anime's Holly Ellingwood, who also stated Papillon is the "most memorable" villain of the series. Carroll said Tokiko "is the best of the bunch", while Kimlinger, who praised her "an oasis of feminine strength in a genre more remarkable for its monster-bait femmes", declared it is one of few characteristics that distinguish the series from other shōnen fighting series. Active Anime's Sandra Scholes praised the character's illustration as well as called Kazuki and Tokiko "wonderful couple". Hanley said he only "feel a little empathy" for Kazuki and Tokiko in later episodes, while Beveridge praised Papillon taking "an amusing role" in those episodes. The supporting cast was also praised; Aronson cited there are "interesting personalities", while Beveridge said they "help it out immensely", and Kimlinger stated that they "so clearly outclassed its main character." The addition of Re-Extermination Squad was praised by Holly Ellingwood of Active Anime who called they "interesting". At the end of the series, Ellingwood praised how Watsuki did "a fabulous job of covering [...] the various characters, juggling them effectively".

In the Buso Renkin official popularity poll conducted by Weekly Shōnen Jump, Tokiko was elected the most popular among the manga fanbase. Kazuki ranked second, Papillon ranked third, Bravo ranked fourth, Shusui ranked fifth, Mahiro ranked sixth, Gouta ranked seventh, Angel Gouzen ranked eight, Ouka ranked ninth, and Moonface ranked tenth. Two of the major villains, Victor and Dr. Butterfly, ranked 15th place and 19th place, respectively.^{[ch. 62]}

== Notes ==
Notes
