= List of Buso Renkin episodes =

The cover of the DVD Box set containing all twenty-six episodes of Buso Renkin released by Geneon Universal Entertainment on November 26, 2009, in Japan

The anime series Buso Renkin is based on the manga series of the same name written by Nobuhiro Watsuki. The series is directed by Takao Kato and produced by Xebec. The episodes follow Kazuki Muto who becomes an Alchemic warrior in the battle against Alchemic monsters known as Homunculi.

The production of the Buso Renkin anime was announced by the release of a minute-long internet trailer. Buso Renkin aired between October 5, 2006, and March 29, 2007,^{A} on TV Tokyo. The episodes were later released in nine DVD compilations between January 25, 2007, and September 21, 2007, by Geneon Universal Entertainment. A DVD box set containing the whole series was released on November 26, 2009.

On December 8, 2007, Viz Media announced the production of the English dub which would be released in two DVD sets of thirteen episodes each. The first set containing episodes one to thirteen was released on April 29, 2008, and the second set contains episodes fourteen to twenty-six and was released on October 7, 2008. On December 20, 2009, the first three episodes from the series were officially uploaded to Hulu and Viz Media's portal. Two episodes were uploaded weekly thereafter with the final episode uploaded on March 8, 2010. Beginning October 2, 2012, Buso Renkin was streamed on Neon Alley.

The series use three pieces of theme music: a single opening theme and two ending themes. The opening theme is "Makka Na Chikai" (真赤な誓い, lit. "Crimson Oath") by Yoshiki Fukuyama. The first ending theme from episodes one to fourteen is "Hoshiakari" (ホシアカリ, lit. "Starlight") by Jyukai and the second theme for the remaining episodes is "Itoshiki Sekai" (愛しき世界, lit. "Beloved World") by Aya Kagami.

== Production team ==
Buso Renkin's original work was created by Nobuhiro Watsuki in the form of a manga. The anime series was produced by Xebec and directed by Takao Kato. The series was planned by Kazuhiko Torishima, Akihiro Kawamura, Koji Kumozu, and Yukinao Shijimoji. The producers were Makota Oyoshi, Nobuhiro Nakayama, Shinichi Ikeda, Hinoyuki Yonemasu and executive producers were Naoko Watanabe and Kohei Kawase. Nobuyoshi Habara directed the opening and ending themes and its animation was directed by Akio Takami. Keito Watanabe directed the art of the series, Natsuyo Ban coordinated the colors, Takuya Matsumura designed the animation for the weapons, and Sunao Chikako designed the props. The sound was directed by Takeshi Takadara; sound effects were done by Mitsuru Kageyama, mixed by Naotsugu Uchida, edited by Akane Sango, and recorded at Half H-P Studio.

On December 8, 2007, Viz Media announced that Buso Renkin would receive an English localization and be released in two DVD sets. The production for the dubbing was coordinated by Marc Schmidt and recorded at Salami Studios located in Hollywood. The cast of the English dub was overseen by Rene Veilleux. The English script was written by her along with Donald Roman Lopez. The automated dialogue replacement mixing was done by Mark Mecado, Johnathan Palomo Abelardo, Jeff Kettle, and Josh Huber.

== Episodes ==
No.	Title	Directed by	Written by	Animation director ^{A}	Original release date	Ref.
1	"A New Life"; Transliteration: "Atarashii inochi" (Japanese: 新しい命)	Tsuyoshi Nagasawa	Gyo Yamatoya	Akio Takami	October 5, 2006	
A 16-year-old boy named Kazuki Muto awakens from a nightmare where he is killed by a monster after trying to save a mysterious girl. At school, a teacher named Mita punishes Kazuki for not having proper school equipment and forces him to stay after school. That night, the teacher reveals himself to be the monster from his dream which really happened, causing Kazuki to experience a flashback where the girl uses a kakugane to restore Kazuki's life. Kazuki is saved by Tokiko Tsumura, the same girl who destroys Mita and explains that the monsters are called Homunculi. These monsters are created from alchemy and can only be destroyed by specialized weapons called buso renkins. Tokiko tells Kazuki to go home while she heads to a warehouse where the Homunculi are hiding. Kazuki ignores her warnings and heads to the warehouse where he activates his buso renkin and defeats the Homunculus leader. The girl introduces herself as Tokiko Tsumura and takes Kazuki as her disciple.
2	"The True Form Homunculus"; Transliteration: "Homunkurusu no shōtai" (Japanese: ホムンクルスの正体)	Yukio Kuroda	Gyo Yamatoya	Yasuo Shimizu	October 12, 2006	
Tokiko's investigation of the warehouse leads her to believe that someone was using the laboratory to create Homunculus matters. She explains that Homunculus matters are parasitic embryos that turn their host into Homunculi. The pair are attacked by a mysterious man who sends a Homunculus matter to attach onto Tokiko only to have it deflected. Later on, Tokiko notices that the Homunculus matter has attached itself onto Kazuki's sister and attempts to destroy it only to have it attach to her instead. She tells Kazuki that she will change into a Homunculus within a week and that they must find the mysterious man before the week ends.
3	"You've Become A Little Stronger"; Transliteration: "Kimi wa sukoshi tsuyoku natta" (Japanese: キミは少し強くなった)	Takeshi Ando	Katsuhiko Koide	Hirokazu Hanai	October 19, 2006	
After learning that the Homunculus creator is a student at Kazuki's school, Kazuki and Tokiko attempt to search for him on the school grounds, but fail to find him. Kazuki is later confronted by a Frog Homunculus and defeats it in battle only to faint from his injuries. A Plant Homunculus appears and prepares to finish off Kazuki, but Tokiko intercepts its attack and kills it. Kazuki regains consciousness and promises to Tokiko that he will work harder from then on.
4	"Another New Life"; Transliteration: "Mō hitotsu no atarashii inochi" (Japanese: もう一つの新しい命)	Shigeru Ueda	Kento Shimoyama	Yuichi Oka	October 26, 2006	
Kazuki and Tokiko finally discover the creator's identity to be Koushaku Chono. Koushaku explains that he intends to turn himself into a humanoid Homunculus with a specially made Homunculus embryo which will grant him abilities and endurance far beyond human capacity. Koushaku's Hawk Homunculus Washio captures Kazuki and Tokiko and takes them to a secluded forest and engages the two in battle.
5	"To Protect Someone"; Transliteration: "Mamoru beki hito no tame ni" (Japanese: 守るべき人のために)	Yukio Kuroda	Kento Shimoyama	Yasuo Shimizu	November 2, 2006	
After enduring a long battle, Kazuki defeats Washio. Tokiko has become unable to move due to the embedded Homunculus embryo and is carried by Kazuki back to town. Kazuki leaves Tokiko in the care of his friends before leaving in search of Koushaku who holds the cure to Tokiko's condition.
6	"The Butterfly of Black Death"; Transliteration: "Kokushi no chō" (Japanese: 黒死の蝶)	Takayoshi Morimiya	Katsuhiko Chiba	Kiyotoshi Aoi; Kazuya Morimae	November 9, 2006	
Kazuki finds Koushaku in his great-great grandfather's laboratory and attempts to destroy the Homunculus matter. However, due to the interference of Koushaku's younger brother Jiro, Koushaku is able to have the Homunculus embryo attach to him and is turned into a Humanoid Homunculus. He then begins to eat everyone in the vicinity until he is killed by Kazuki, who passes out from exhaustion before he is able to deliver the cure to Tokiko. Kazuki awakens to find the cured Tokiko who christens his buso renkin Sunlight Heart.
7	"Whether or not You're a Hypocrite"; Transliteration: "Moshi kimi ga gizen to utagau no nara" (Japanese: もし君が偽善と疑うのなら)	Isao Takayama	Gyo Yamatoya	Takuya Matsumura	November 16, 2006	
Captain Bravo, a member of the Alchemist Warriors and the one who delivered the cure to Tokiko, offers Kazuki a chance to join their mission combating the LXE, a group consisting of Human-type Homunculi based in Kazuki's town. Koushaku, having been resurrected by the LXE's leader who is also his great-great grandfather, Dr. Butterfly, and now calling himself Papillon, seeks Kazuki and declares war on him. Kazuki, Tokiko and Bravo are then attacked by Kinjo, a Homunculus of the LXE, but he is quickly dispatched by Bravo.
8	"A Night in the Dorm"; Transliteration: "Kishukusha no yoru" (Japanese: 寄宿舎の夜)	Yukio Kuroda	Katsuhiko Koide	Yasuo Shimizu	November 23, 2006	
During the night, Bravo takes Kazuki out to the woods for special training while Tokiko protects the kakugane acquired from the previous battle. Later on, a Homunculus named Jinnai uses a buso renkin and takes control over the students in the dorm, ordering them to take the kakugane from Tokiko. Tokiko is able to avoid her classmates and kill Jinnai, freeing them from his control. Papillon takes the kakugane from the defeated Homunculus, declares that he will defeat Kazuki and then leaves the scene.
9	"The Hayasaka Twins"; Transliteration: "Hayasaka kyōdai" (Japanese: 早坂姉弟)	Shunji Yoshida	Kento Shimoyama	Seiya Numata	November 30, 2006	
Kazuki and Tokiko befriend the Hayasaka twins, Shusui and Ouka. However, the twins are actually humans working with the LXE ordered to kill the Alchemist warriors at the school. When two LXE Homunculi invade the school, Kazuki and Tokiko intercept the threats, causing the twins to realize who the Alchemist Warriors are and that they must kill their friends.
10	"It Seems We're Well Matched"; Transliteration: "Kimi to ore ha aishō ga ii" (Japanese: 君と俺は相性がいい)	Akihiro Enomoto	Gyo Yamatoya	Yuichi Ouka	December 7, 2006	
The four begin to battle and Kazuki eventually inflicts a fatal wound on Shusui. Ouka uses her buso renkin and heals Shusui while at the same time receiving Shusui's wound on her own body. Due to this, Kazuki realizes they are both humans and not Homunculi and questions whether they are the enemy or not. Shusui reveals that they worked under the LXE so that one day the two can become Homunculi and live together for eternity.
11	"'Til Death Do Us Part"; Transliteration: "Shi ga futari o wakatsu made" (Japanese: 死が二人を別つまで)	Yukio Kuroda	Gyo Yamatoya	Yasuo Shimizu	December 14, 2006	
Tokiko proceeds to eliminate the twins but is stopped by Kazuki who argues that they are still human and deserve to live. Shusui inflicts a critical wound on Kazuki while he is distracted. However, Ouka uses her buso renkin and absorbs Kazuki's wound damage claiming that Kazuki is someone they can trust. As Ouka begins to die, Kazuki, Tokiko and Shusui are able to avert her death with the healing properties of the kakuganes. The next day, Kazuki and Tokiko visit Ouka in the hospital who reveals that her brother had left to train in order to rid himself of LXE's corruption.
12	"Carnival"; Transliteration: "Kaanibaru" (Japanese: カーニバル)	Tsuyoshi Nagasawa	Katsuhiko Chiba	Masayuki Kato	December 21, 2006	
Kazuki, Tokiko and Bravo infiltrate the LXE's base only to find out Dr. Butterfly and his army of Homunculi are targeting Kazuki's school. While Bravo engages in battle in the base with the Homunculus called Moonface, Kazuki and Tokiko defends the school from Dr. Butterfly and his homunculus army.
13	"Signs of Death"; Transliteration: "Shi no taidō" (Japanese: 死の胎動)	Tsuyoshi Yoshimoto	Kento Shimoyama	Seiya Numata	December 28, 2006	
After defeating the Homunculi, the flask Dr. Butterfly has with him activates and begins to drain energy from everyone inside the school. Papillon appears with his own buso renkin activated and challenges Dr. Butterfly to a battle, eventually coming out victorious.
14	"Who Are You?"; Transliteration: "Kimi wa dare da?" (Japanese: キミは誰だ?)	Isao Takayama	Katsuhiko Koide	Takuya Matsumura	December 28, 2006	
Before Dr. Butterfly dies, he explains that a man named Victor is inside the flask and that he is a being far superior to humans and Homunculi. Kazuki destroys the flask, but Victor has already revived. Kazuki engages Victor in battle and is seemingly killed after having his kakugane destroyed. Kazuki regains his kakugane which is revealed to be a black kakugane, causing him to transform into a being like Victor with glowing light green hair, red eyes and copper-colored skin.
15	"An Intermediate Existence"; Transliteration: "Chūkan no sonzai" (Japanese: 中間の存在)	Yukio Kuroda	Katsuhiko Koide	Yasuo Shimizu	January 11, 2007	
After a short battle, Victor concludes that it would take too much time to defeat Kazuki and leaves the school. After reuniting with Captain Bravo, Papillon leaves to research Victor in order to turn Kazuki back into a human being. The next day, they decide to head to the beach where Tokiko runs into Gouta Nakamura. He tells Tokiko to meet with him at night for important information.
16	"New Strength"; Transliteration: "Arata naru chikara" (Japanese: 新たなる力)	Shigeru Ueda	Gyo Yamatoya	Yuichi Oka	January 18, 2007	
That night, Gouta calls Tokiko out and tells her that Kazuki will be killed. Captain Bravo tells Kazuki that in six weeks, Kazuki will be passively draining energy from those around him like Victor and that Bravo has been ordered to kill Kazuki before the transformation is complete. In a short battle, Bravo handily defeats Kazuki and leaves him for dead by throwing his inert body into the ocean.
17	"When Dawn Comes"; Transliteration: "Yoru ga ake tara" (Japanese: 夜が明けたら)	Takeshi Ando	Katsuhiko Chiba	Hirokazu Hanai	January 25, 2007	
Tokiko manages to find Kazuki's body in the ocean and is able to revive him. Meanwhile, Gouta learns that a team led out by Alchemist Warrior Chief Sekima Hiwatari is sent to confirm Kazuki's death. Gouta learns they plan to assassinate Tokiko and impedes their mission before escaping and rendezvousing with Kazuki and Tokiko. The three then prepare to travel to the school where Tokiko had found Kazuki's kakugane in order to find a way to restore his humanity.
18	"The Escape"; Transliteration: "Tōhikō" (Japanese: 逃避行)	Hideya Takahashi	Gyo Yamatoya	Sunao Chikaoka	February 1, 2007	
Tokiko explains that a mysterious person gave her Kazuki's kakugane and that person may know how to reverse the black kakugane's effect. Meanwhile, Papillon intercepts the team searching for Kazuki and engages one of its members, Genji Ikusabe in battle. Elsewhere, Shusui is recruited by the Alchemist Warriors for the upcoming battle against Victor. Kazuki's group is ambushed by the team at a graveyard.
19	"As Long As I Can Protect You"; Transliteration: "Kimi sae mamorere ba" (Japanese: 君さえ守れれば)	Yukio Kuroda	Kento Shimoyama	Yasuo Shimizu	February 8, 2007	
Hiwatari's buso renkin separates Kazuki from Tokiko and Gota. Papillon manages to defeat Ikusabe and learns about Kazuki's whereabouts from him. Tokiko and Gouta are able to defeat the enemy, Shinobu Negoro, and resume searching for Kazuki. Elsewhere, the other group of Alchemist Warriors finds Victor and engages him in battle only to be easily beaten, though Shusui's abilities save them from certain death.
20	"With Strength and Power"; Transliteration: "Omoi to chikara o kome te" (Japanese: 想いと力を込めて)	Sunhi Son	Katsuhiko Koide	Akio Takami	February 15, 2007	
Kazuki runs into Captain Bravo, engages him in battle but is soon overwhelmed. Despite the information Tokiko is able to relay, Bravo tells them that after he kills Kazuki, he will kill himself to repent for his death. Kazuki, enraged that his failure will result in Bravo's death, pierces Bravo's buso renkin and wounds him. Bravo accepts that Kazuki has become stronger and allows him to continue his search for a cure. However, they are then interrupted by Hiwatari's appearance.
21	"Gone Into Flame^{B}"	Tsuyoshi Nagasawa	Katsuhiko Chiba	Akio Takami; Hatsue Kato	February 22, 2007	
Hiwatari engages the four in battle and Bravo is critically wounded in the process. Just before Kazuki and Hiwatari finish each other off, the Alchemist General, Shosei Sakaguchi, stops them, explaining Kazuki's assassination has been suspended and that the top priority for the Alchemists is the battle against Victor. Shosei then reinstates Tokiko and Gouta as Alchemy Warriors and allows Kazuki to continue his search for a cure.
22	"A Decision Is Required"; Transliteration: "Ketsudan o yōsu" (Japanese: 決断を要す)	Yukio Kuroda	Gyo Yamatoya	Yasuo Shimizu	February 28, 2007	
The Alchemist Warriors find and engage Victor in battle. Meanwhile, Kazuki, Tokiko, Gouta and Papillon arrive at the school and meet a mysterious figure who introduces herself as Victoria and leads them to her brain in a vat mother, Alexandria, the creator of the black kakugane. Alexandria reveals her creation, a white kakugane, and explains it is able to negate the effects of the black kakugane. However, with only one in existence, Kazuki must decide whether to use it on himself or Victor.
23	"Boy meets Battle Girl^{A}"	Daisuke Takashima	Kento Shimoyama	Yumi Shimizu; Masaki Tanigawa; Hiroyuki Kaido	March 8, 2007	
Kazuki and Tokiko spend time with their friends at the amusement park. After much thought, Kazuki decides what he will do with the white kakugane. Meanwhile, the battle between the Alchemist Warriors and Victor continues.
24	"When You Die, I'll Die With You"; Transliteration: "Kimi ga shinu toki ga watashi ga shinu toki" (Japanese: キミが死ぬ時が私が死ぬ時)	Yukio Kuroda	Kento Shimoyama	Yasuo Shimizu	March 15, 2007	
Kazuki retrieves the white kakugane from Alexandria and proceeds to where the battle between Victor and the Alchemist Warriors is taking place. Using his buso renkin, he forces the white kakugane into Victor; However the white kakugane fails to restore him into a human and merely weakens him. Kazuki then propels himself to the moon, dragging Victor with him and saving the Earth from Victor but leaving a grief-stricken Tokiko behind.
25	"No One Could Ever Take His Place"; Transliteration: "Kawari nado inai" (Japanese: 代わりなどいない)	Daisuke Tsukushi	Gyo Yamatoya	Sunao Chikaoka	March 22, 2007	
Kazuki's friends mourn for his sacrifice and return to their daily lives. Tokiko decides to battle Papillon before leaving town. Accompanied by Gouta, Shusui and Ouka, Tokiko is able to bypass Papillon's Homunculi and confront him declaring she will fight him in Kazuki's place.
26	"Period"; Transliteration: "Piriodo" (Japanese: ピリオド)	Takeshi Nagasawa	Gyo Yamatoya	Akio Takami	March 29, 2007	
Papillon is revealed to have been making a white kakugane to restore Kazuki. The battle is stopped when they notice that Kazuki's buso renkin's light is seen on the moon. The Alchemist Warriors, using Shosei's buso renkin, fly into space in order to retrieve Kazuki. Victor decides to send Kazuki back to Earth with the use of his own buso renkin. Kazuki, seeing the good in Victor, drags him back to Earth. Papillon, using his white kakugane, restores Kazuki's humanity and the two begin their long awaited duel. The Alchemist Warriors are able to create another white kakugane and restore Victor back into a human. Victor asks them to turn him into a Homunculus and that he will lead all the Homunculi to the moon until they find a way to revert Homunculi back into humans. From then on, Kazuki and Tokiko return to their daily lives while Papillon becomes an urban legend.

== Volume DVDs ==
=== Japanese release ===
Geneon Universal Entertainment released nine DVD compilations between January 25, 2007, and September 21, 2007, in Japan. A DVD box set containing all twenty-six episodes was released on November 26, 2009.

Geneon Universal Entertainment (Japan, Region 2 DVD)
Volume	Episodes	Release date	Ref.
Volume 1	1–2	January 25, 2007	
Volume 2	3–5	February 23, 2007	
Volume 3	6–8	March 28, 2007	
Volume 4	9–11	April 25, 2007	
Volume 5	12–14	May 25, 2007	
Volume 6	15–17	April 24, 2007	
Volume 7	18–20	July 25, 2007	
Volume 8	21–23	August 24, 2007	
Volume 9	24-26	September 21, 2007	
Box	1–26	November 26, 2009	

=== North American release ===
Viz Media released the English dub of the series in two DVD compilations which contain thirteen episodes each.

Viz Media (North America, Region 1 DVD)
Volume	Episodes	Release date	Ref.
Volume 1	1–13	April 29, 2008	
Volume 2	14–26	October 7, 2008	

== Notes and references ==
Notes

- ^A The official website of Buso Renkin informs episodes aired between October 4, 2006, and March 28, 2007, at the 25:00 AM timeslot. This, technically, means that the show was broadcast always a day later than what is featured on the site.
- ^B The episode's title used English lettering in the Japanese airing.

General references

- "Buso Renkin Official Website" (in Japanese). Xebec. Archived from the original on December 26, 2009.
- "Viz Buso Renkin Episodes 1–10". Viz Media. Archived from the original on June 6, 2011.
- "Viz Buso Renkin Episodes 11–20". Viz Media. Archived from the original on November 25, 2010.
- "Viz Buso Renkin Episodes 21–26". Viz Media. Archived from the original on November 25, 2010.

Specific references
