= List of 3×3 Eyes volumes =

3×3 Eyes (pronounced Sazan Aizu (サザンアイズ) in Japanese) (Note: "Sazan" is derived from the fact that there are 3 Sanjiyan Unkara with 3 eyes each, "sazan" being how "3 times 3" is pronounced when reciting the multiplication table in Japanese, and also from the transliteration of the English word "southern".) is a Japanese manga series written and illustrated by Yuzo Takada and first serialized in Kodansha's seinen manga magazine Young Magazine Kaizokuban from 1987 to 1989. It was then transferred to Weekly Young Magazine, where it was serialized from 1987 to 2002. These two serializations were originally published in 40 tankobon volumes.

From December 26, 2014, to August 12, 2016, a manga sequel titled 3×3 Eyes: Genjū no Mori no Sōnansha (3×3EYES 幻獣の森の遭難者), began on the manga website Young Magazine Kaizokuban (later renamed e Young Magazine in 2015) The series is compiled into 4 volumes.

On December 22, 2016, a second manga sequel, titled 3×3 Eyes: Kiseki no Yami no Keiyakusha (3×3EYES 鬼籍の闇の契約者), began serialization on e Young Magazine online manga magazine. It was transferred to Monthly Young Magazine on February 20, 2019. As of November 26, 2022, the two serializations have been published in 7 volumes.

== Volume List ==
=== 3×3 Eyes ===
==== Original release ====
- Kodansha (Yanmaga KC Special/Young Magazine Comics, 1988–2002)

Vol.	Japanese release date	Japanese ISBN
01	October 14, 1988	978-4061021235
02	May 15, 1989	978-4061021525
03	October 13, 1989	978-4061021679
04	February 13, 1990	978-4061021914
05	June 11, 1990	978-4061022072
06	October 29, 1990	978-4061022287
07	February 27, 1991	978-4061022560
08	May 30, 1991	978-4061022713
09	September 3, 1991	978-4061022867
10	December 24, 1991	978-4063233063
11	March 31, 1992	978-4063233261
12	July 31, 1992	978-4063233438
13	December 24, 1992	978-4063233681
14	April 28, 1993	978-4063233988
15	September 2, 1993	978-4063234213
16	December 27, 1993	978-4063234428
17	June 1, 1994	978-4063234688
18	October 4, 1994	978-4063234886
19	March 1, 1995	978-4063235210
20	August 3, 1995	978-4063235524
21	January 5, 1996	978-4063235753
22	May 2, 1996	978-4063235944
23	August 3, 1996	978-4063366112
24	December 4, 1996	978-4063366358
25	April 2, 1997	978-4063366563
26	August 4, 1997	978-4063366761
27	January 5, 1998	978-4063367119
28	June 3, 1998	978-4063367393
29	August 4, 1998	978-4063367508
30	December 2, 1998	978-4063367683
31	May 1, 1999	978-4063367980
32	October 20, 1999	978-4063368307
33	December 28, 1999	978-4063368475
34	June 3, 2000	978-4063368734
35	December 4, 2000	978-4063369120
36	April 27, 2001	978-4063369472
37	October 3, 2001	978-4063369823
38	March 4, 2002	978-4063610208
39	November 2, 2002	978-4063610826
40	November 2, 2002	978-4063610833

==== Re-releases ====
- Kodansha (KC Deluxe, 2002)

Vol.	Japanese release date	Japanese ISBN
01	April 23, 2002	978-4063345353
02	April 23, 2002	978-4063345360
03	May 21, 2002	978-4063345377
04	May 21, 2002	978-4063345384

- Kodansha (Kodansha Manga Bunko, 2009–2010)

Vol.	Japanese release date	Japanese ISBN
01	August 12, 2009	978-4063706673
02	August 12, 2009	978-4063706680
03	September 11, 2009	978-4063706710
04	September 11, 2009	978-4063706727
05	October 9, 2009	978-4063706789
06	October 9, 2009	978-4063706796
07	November 11, 2009	978-4063706895
08	November 11, 2009	978-4063706901
09	December 11, 2009	978-4063707014
10	December 11, 2009	978-4063707021
11	January 8, 2010	978-4063707212
12	January 8, 2010	978-4063707229
13	February 10, 2010	978-4063707236
14	February 10, 2010	978-4063707243
15	March 12, 2010	978-4063707328
16	March 12, 2010	978-4063707335
17	April 19, 2010	978-4063707410
18	April 19, 2010	978-4063707427
19	May 12, 2010	978-4063707458
20	May 12, 2010	978-4063707465
21	June 11, 2010	978-4063707496
22	June 11, 2010	978-4063707502
23	July 9, 2010	978-4063707519
24	July 9, 2010	978-4063707526

==== Dark Horse English release ====
- Dark Horse (Trade Paperback, 1995–2004)

Vol.	Japanese release date	Japanese ISBN
01	March 1, 1995 (First Edition); May 7, 2003 (Second Edition)	978-1569710593 (First Edition); 978-1569719312 (Second Edition)
02	February 1, 1997 (First Edition); May 7, 2003 (Second Edition)	978-1569711750 (First Edition); 978-1569719305 (Second Edition)
03	November 7, 2001	978-1569715536
04	March 6, 2002	978-1569717356
05	August 14, 2002	978-1569717479
06	January 2, 2003	978-1569718810
07	August 13, 2003	978-1569719817
08	May 4, 2004	978-1593072162

=== 3×3 Eyes: Genjū no Mori no Sōnansha ===
- Kodansha (Yanmaga KC Special, 2015–2016)

Vol.	Japanese release date	Japanese ISBN
01	June 27, 2015	978-4063826197
02	November 6, 2015	978-4063827057
03	April 20, 2016	978-4063827675
04	October 20, 2016	978-4063828672

=== 3×3 Eyes: Kiseki no Yami no Keiyakusha ===
- Kodansha (Yanmaga KC Special, 2017–Present)

Vol.	Japanese release date	Japanese ISBN
01	June 20, 2017	978-4063829815
02	December 20, 2017	978-4065105290
03	July 20, 2018	978-4065120453
04	February 20, 2019	978-4065145678
05	March 9, 2020	978-4065188361
06	September 17, 2021	978-4065247631
07	August 19, 2022	978-4065287910
