= Yakumo =

Yakumo may refer to:

== People with the given name ==
- Lafcadio Hearn or Koizumi Yakumo (小泉 八雲?) (1850–1904), international writer known for his collections of Japanese legends and ghost stories

== Fictional characters ==
- Yakumo, a character in Yu Yu Hakusho The Movie: Poltergeist Report
- Yakumo Fujii, the main character in 3×3 Eyes media
- Yakumo Tatsuro, a main character in the anime Shinzo
- Yakumo Tsukamoto, a character in School Rumble media
- Ran Yakumo and Yukari Yakumo, characters in the videos game Perfect Cherry Blossom in the Touhou Projectseries
- Shohei Yakumo, a character in Shin Megami Tensei V

== Places ==
- Yakumo, Hokkaidō, a town in Hokkaidō Prefecture, Japan
- Yakumo, Shimane, a village in Shimane Prefecture, Japan
- Yakumo Sub Base, a military air base
- Yakumo Town Museum, a museum in Yakumo, Hokkaidō

== Others ==
- Yakumo (train), a train service in Japan
- Japanese cruiser Yakumo, a cruiser of the Imperial Japanese Navy
- Psychic Detective Yakumo
