= List of Buso Renkin chapters =

Written and illustrated by Nobuhiro Watsuki, with occasional writing assistance from his wife Kaoru Kurosaki, Buso Renkin was serialized in Shueisha's shōnen magazine, Weekly Shōnen Jump from June 2003 to 2005, ending at 80 chapters. The individual chapters were collected by Shueisha into 10 tankōbon volumes which were released between January 5, 2004, and April 4, 2006. Viz Media released the manga's ten tankōbon volumes between August 1, 2006, and February 5, 2008. The manga is licensed in France by Glénat, and in Germany by Tokyopop Germany.

== Volumes list ==
| No. | Title | Original release date | English release date |
|---|---|---|---|
| 1 | New Life; Atarashii Inochi (新しい命) | January 5, 2004; 4-08-873557-9 | August 1, 2006; 1-4215-0615-7 |
1. "New Life" (新しい命, Atarashii Inochi); 2. "Midnight Run" (ミッドナイト・ラン, Middonaito Ran); 3. "Homunculus's Identity" (ホムンクルスの正体, Homunkurusu no Shōtai); 4. "Parasite Homunculus" (ホムンクルス・寄生, Homunkurusu Kisei); 5. "VS. Kawazui: Part 1" (VS．蛙井（前編）, Bāsasu Kawazui (Zenpen)); 6. "VS. Kawazui: Part 2" (VS．蛙井（後編）, Bāsasu Kawazui (Kōhen)); 7. "You're a Little Stronger" (キミは少し 強くなった, Kimi wa Sukoshi Tsuyoku Natta)
| 2 | Fade to Black; FEIDO TU BURAKKU (FADE TO BLACK) | April 2, 2004; 4-08-873587-0 | October 3, 2006; 1-4215-0616-5 |
8. "Lock On" (ロックオン, Rokku On); 9. "The Other New Life" (もう一つの新しい命, Mō Hitotsu no Atarashii Inochi); 10. "VS. Washio: Section 1" (VS．鷲尾（前編）, Bāsasu Washio (Zenpen)); 11. "VS. Washio: Part 2: Section 1" (VS．鷲尾（中編①）, Bāsasu Washio (Chūhen ①)); 12. "VS. Washio: Part 2: Section 2" (VS．鷲尾（中編②）, Bāsasu Washio (Chūhen ②)); 13. "VS. Washio: Part 3" (VS．鷲尾（後編）, Bāsasu Washio (Kōhen)); 14. "Midnight Run 2" (ミッドナイト・ラン2, Middonaito Ran Tsū); 15. "Dark, Hot and Sweet" (黒く 熱く 甘く, Kuroku Atsuku Amaku); 16. "Butterfly of Black Death" (黒死の蝶, Kuroshi no Chō); 17. "Fade to Black" (FADE TO BLACK, FEIDO TU BURAKKU)
| 3 | If You Doubt That You Are a Hypocrite; Moshi Kimi ga Jibun o Gizen to Utagau naraba (もしキミが自分を偽善と疑うならば) | July 2, 2004; 4-08-873630-3 | December 5, 2006; 1-4215-0617-3 |
18. "If You Doubt That You Are A Hypocrite" (もしキミが自分を偽善と疑うならば, Moshi Kimi ga Jibun o Gizen to Utagau naraba); 19. "Kazuki and Tokiko's Choice, Part 1" (カズキと斗(ト)貴(キ)子(コ)の選(せん)択(たく)（前(ぜん)編(ぺん)）, Kazuki to Tokiko no Sentaku (Zenpen)); 20. "Kazuki and Tokiko's Choice, Part 2" (カズキと斗(ト)貴(キ)子(コ)の選(せん)択(たく)（中(ちゅう)編(へん)）, Kazuki to Tokiko no Sentaku (Chūhen)); 21. "Kazuki and Tokiko's Choice, Part 3" (カズキと斗(ト)貴(キ)子(コ)の選(せん)択(たく)（後(こう)編(へん)）, Kazuki to Tokiko no Sentaku (Kōhen)); 22. "Night in the Dormitory" (寄宿舎の夜, Kishukusha no Yoru); 23. "Warrior Tokiko" (戦(せん)士(し)・斗(ト)貴(キ)子(コ), Senshi Tokiko); 24. "Destroy All Enemies" (敵は全て, Teki wa Subete); 25. "The Hayasaka Siblings" (早(はや)坂(さか)姉(きょう)弟(だい), Hayasaka Kyōdai); 26. "Training Day" (トレーニング・デイ, Torēningu Dei)
| 4 | Carnival; Kānibaru [Matsuri] (カーニバル［祭］) | September 3, 2004; 4-08-873651-6 | February 6, 2007; 1-4215-0840-0 |
27. "Just the Two of Us" (二人ぼっち, Futaribotchi); 28. "Level One" (第一次成長, Daiichiji Seichō); 29. "A Lot in Common" (相性がいい, Aishō ga Ii); 30. "Close Combat" (接戦, Sessen); 31. "Familiars" (信奉者, Shinpōsha); 32. "The World of the Hayasaka Twins" (早(はや)坂(さか)姉(きょう)弟(だい)の世(せ)界(かい), Hayasaka Kyōdai no Sekai); 33. "Don't Give Up!" (諦めるな！, Akirameru na!); 34. "To the Hospital" (Let’sお見舞い, Rettsu o-Mimai); 35. "Thirteen Hours to Go" (作戦開始は13時間後, Sakusen Kaishi wa Jūsan-jikan-go); 36. "Carnival" (カーニバル［祭］, Kānibaru [Matsuri])
| 5 | A Friend of Everybody a furendo obu eburibadi (a friend of everybody) | November 4, 2004; 4-08-873670-2 | April 3, 2007; 1-4215-0841-9 |
37. "Items of the Same Type" (同類項, Dōruikō); 38. "A Friend of Everybody" (a friend of everybody, a furendo obu eburibadi); 39. "The Power Gushing Out" (湧きたつ力, Wakitatsu Chikara); 40. "A Sign of Death" (死の胎動, Shi no Taidō); 41. "Papillon Vs. Butterfly, Part I" (パピヨンVS.バタフライ（前編）, Papiyon bāsasu Batafurai (Zenpen)); 42. "Papillon Vs. Butterfly, Part II" (パピヨンVS.バタフライ（後編）, Papiyon bāsasu Batafurai (Kōhen)); 43. "Who Are You?" (キミは誰だ？, Kimi wa Dare da?); 44. "The Pulse Quickens" (鼓動 昂る, Kodō Takaburu); 45. "A Spring Night of Two Months Past" (二ゕ月前の春の夜, Nikagatsu-mae no Haru no Yoru)
| 6 | A New Mission; Aratanaru Ninmu (新たなる任務) | February 4, 2005; 4-08-873696-6 | June 5, 2007; 1-4215-0842-7 |
46. "Heart Shift" (ハートシフト, Hāto Shifuto); 47. "End of the Battle" (戦闘終結, Sentō Shūketsu); 48. "A Warrior's Respite" (戦士の休息, Senshi no Kyūsoku); 49. "A New Mission" (新たなる任務, Aratanaru Ninmu); 50. "Say It's Not So, Bravo" (Say it not so, Bravo., Sei itto notto sō, Burabō.); 51. "Crimson Ocean" (Crimson Ocean, Kurimuzon Ōshan); 52. "Re-Extermination Complete" (再殺完了, Saisatsu Kanryō); 53. "When the Night Ends" (夜が明けたら, Yo ga Aketa ra); 54. "One Heart and One Mind" (一心同体, Isshin Dōtai)
| 7 | Runaway Start; Rannawei Sutāto (逃避行(ランナウェイ)開始(スタート)) | April 4, 2005; 4-08-873780-6 | August 7, 2007; 1-4215-1045-6 |
55. "Rainy Emotions" (レイニーエモーション, Reinī Emōshon); 56. "The New Third" (THE ANOTHER THIRD, JI ANAZĀ SĀDO); 57. "Runaway Start" (逃避行(ランナウェイ)開始(スタート), Rannawei Sutāto); 58. "Episode Zero" (エピソード0, Episōdo Zero); 59. "No Intention of Losing" (負けるつもりはない, Makeru Tsumori wa Nai); 60. "Wind and Leaves" (WIND and LEAVES, WINDO ando RĪBUZU); 61. "Who's the Monster?" (Which is MONSTER, Fitchi izu MONSUTĀ); 62. "Ikusabe Attacks" (戦部(イクサベ)出(しゅつ)撃(げき), Ikusabe Shutsugeki); 63. "Gekisen, the Cross Spear" (十文字槍(クロススピアー)・激(ゲキ)戦(セン), Kurosu Supiā Gekisen)
| 8 | The Determination to Protect What's Important to the End; Daiji na Mono o Shishu Sen to suru Tsuyoi Ishi (大(だい)事(じ)な存(モ)在(ノ)を死(し)守(しゅ)せんとする強(つよ)い意(い)志(し)) | July 4, 2005; 4-08-873820-9 | October 2, 2007; 1-4215-1046-4 |
64. "Eater" (EATER, ĪTĀ); 65. "Dawn at the Graveyard" (夜明けの墓場, Yoake no Hakaba); 66. "No Regrets" (NO REGRET, NŌ RIGURETTO); 67. "Secret Passage of the Shadows" (影の抜け道, Kage no Nukemichi); 68. "Meanwhile" (とりあえず———…, Toriaezu———…); 69. "Round Two" (セカンドラウンド, Sekando Raundo); 70. "The Determination to Protect What's Important to the End" (大(だい)事(じ)な存(モ)在(ノ)を死(し)守(しゅ)せんとする強(つよ)い意(い)志(し), Daiji na Mono o Shishu Sen to suru Tsuyoi Ishi); 71. "Excel" (EXCEL, EKUSERU); 72. "Gone into Flames" (GONE INTO FLAME, GŌN INTU FUREIMU); 73. "Leave This to Me" (ここは任せて, Koko wa Makasete)
| 9 | Boy Meets Battle Girl; BŌI MĪTSU BATORU GĀRU (BOY MEETS BATTLE GIRL) | November 4, 2005; 4-08-873851-9 | December 4, 2007; 1-4215-1047-2 |
74. "The Two Final Battles" (二つの決戦, Futatsu no Kessen); 75. "Infiltrating Newton Apple Academy for Girls" (突入 ニュートンアップル女学院, Totsunyū Nyūton Appuru Jogakuin); 76. "Secret of the Mask" (仮面の正体, Kamen no Shōtai); 77. "Great Battle" (大決戦, Daikessen); 78. "Require a Decision" (決断を要す…, Ketsudan o Yōsu…); 79. "Boy Meets Battle Girl" (BOY MEETS BATTLE GIRL, BŌI MĪTSU BATORU GĀRU); "Buso Renkin Finale" (武(ブ)装(ソウ)錬(レン)金(キン)ファイナル, Busō Renkin Fainaru)
| 10 | Period; Piriodo (ピリオド) | April 4, 2006; 4-08-874019-X | February 5, 2008; 1-4215-1542-3 |
"Buso Renkin: Period" (武(ブ)装(ソウ)錬(レン)金(キン)ピリオド, Busō Renkin Piriodo); "Special One-shot: Embalming -Corpse and Bride-" (エンバーミング -DEAD BODY and BRIDE-, Enbāmingu -DEDDO BODI ando BURAIDO-); "Buso Renkin: Afterward" (武(ブ)装(ソウ)錬(レン)金(キン)アフター, Busō Renkin Afutā)
