= Interpreting Anime =

2018 reference work by Christopher Bolton

- Author: Christopher Bolton
- Genre: Reference
- Publisher: University of Minnesota Press
- Publication date: 2018
- Pages: 328
- ISBN: 978-1-4529-5683-1
- OCLC: 1022266169
- Text: Interpreting Anime at Project MUSE

Interpreting Anime is a 2018 reference work by the literature scholar Christopher Bolton.

== Reception ==
Réka Kormos's essay applauded the book's central "analysis [as Bolton] does not barely rely on history; he tries to show us the mentality, and even the national trauma that lies behind [many anime works]", allowing war to be presented as his main theme of discussion. While she pointed out the rewarding "merits" in his thesis, she also stated that "there are some cases where the topic of war overshadows the aspects that made certain shows popular." She did, however, highlight his careful breakdown of subcultures, such as otaku in some instances while also pointing out that other areas of his discussion were lacking where he failed to fully explain his introduced concepts for his audience that may have been less familiar with said topics. Speaking of his Akira chapter, she appreciated how he explored artists and their personal histories which were rooted in cultural politics, calling his postmodernist take on the film "strong." On the other hand, she was overwhelmed by his analysis of mecha anime, specifically Patlabor II, which was bogged down in excessive detail with ideas centering on the characters' relationships of their established universe with the events of World War II that likely influenced the story's framework. She honed in on Bolton's interpretation of "geopolitics [being] placed in the centre" of Patlabor II whereas, in Ghost in the Shell, "gender politics is in focus," discussing the protagonist, Kusanagi Motoko's role in a world that has combined human bodies with technology, which was further mirrored by Bolton's feminist theories of 3×3 Eyes and Vampire Princess Miyu. "It turns out that neither of the protagonists [in these titles] can get rid of their stereotypical woman role and they are still overly sexualized even if it is about cyborgs, vampires, or shapeshifters," she stated. She lauded Bolton's critical reading of Satoshi Kon's work in his use of reflections to represent intersubjectivity, and finally, she found the bibliography impressive, identifying this section as "more useful to researchers, scholars, and students" than the bulk of the book's content. Bolton's writing overall was praised since he "manages to show us that [anime] can be handled and consumed as a piece of high art" without being inaccessible to the average viewer.

Steven Holmes, in a review for the Journal of the Fantastic in the Arts, appreciated Bolton's examination of the "complexities and contradictions of thinking about Akira (1988) in the context of cultural history". He criticized the Akira chapter for not being "better foregrounded", and felt that Bolton's focus on postmodern analysis was off-topic from the main arguments and would be excessively challenging for the average reader. However, he wrote that the film's cultural frames are explored with "deftness", and strongly recommended the chapter.
