= All Purpose Cultural Cat-Girl Nuku Nuku DASH! =

Japanese original video animation

- All Purpose Cultural Cat Girl Nuku Nuku DASH!
- DVD volume 1 cover.

万能文化猫娘DASH! (Bannou Bunka Neko-Musume DASH!)
- Genre: Action, Comedy, Science fiction
- Original video animation
- Directed by: Yoshitaka Fujimoto
- Written by: Osamu Kudo (ep 1, 3, 9); Tomoko Konparu (ep 2, 5); Chika Hojo (ep 4, 6); Kiyoshi Murayama (ep 7-8); Hiroshi Yamaguchi (10–12)
- Studio: Ashi Productions
- Licensed by: NA: Discotek Media
- Released: September 23, 1998 – December 23, 1998
- Runtime: 24 minutes per episode
- Episodes: 12

All Purpose Cultural Cat Girl Nuku Nuku DASH! (万能文化猫娘DASH!, Bannou Bunka Neko-Musume DASH!), shortened to Nuku Nuku DASH, is a 12-episode Japanese anime OVA series and the third adaptation of the manga, All Purpose Cultural Cat Girl Nuku Nuku, created by Yuzo Takada. Nuku Nuku DASH was produced by the Banneko Dash Committee, which included Ashi Productions, MOVIC, and Starchild Records, and directed by Yoshitaka Fujimoto. The series was released on DVD in three volumes from September 23, 1998, to December 23, 1998. The English language was licensed by ADV Films and was also released on three DVD volumes from October 28, 2003, to January 20, 2004. Discotek Media announced the rescue license of this series, along with the original OVA and TV Series.

== Plot summary ==
The Natsume family — Professor Kyusaku, his wife Akiko, and 14-year-old son Ryunosuke — take in a young woman by the name of Atsuko, who has lost her memory. Unbeknownst to all of them, Atsuko is an Androrobot prototype which has escaped from the power Mishima Corporation's research facilities.

In order to track down the missing prototype, Mishima transferred Akiko, who is employed by the corporation, to a new secret department to hunt for the Androrobot. Professor Kyusaku has secrets of his own and discovers that Atsuko is an Androrobot and sneaks Atsuko down into his hidden lab under the house in order to attempt to unlock her secrets. Ryunosuke knows there's something different about Atsuko but she seems pretty normal outside of the fact that she can't remember anything about herself, and he is quite happy to have her around.

== Differences from previous adaptations ==
Nuku Nuku DASH! is a completely alternate universe, as evidenced by the radical change in the ages and general appearances of most of the characters, though they do tend to retain some of their original look. In DASH!, Nuku Nuku has matured from a 14- to 16-year-old appearance to a 19-year-old and is much curvier than in the original OVAs or Nuku Nuku TV. She has actual blood flowing in her body. She also sports green hair of a shade so light that it is often mistaken for blonde and golden eyes and has a form of selective memory loss, which is later explained near the end of the series when her memories are regained. She also enters tactical form, in which she can use her androbot powers, whenever the need to protect life arises. The civilians call Nuku Nuku in tactical form, 'Super Dynamite Girl'. Kyusaku is not her creator in DASH! but rather is a friend of her creator, a man known simply as Professor Higuchi. As a result, Nuku Nuku, despite still using the familiar nickname, is actually named Atsuko Higuchi in this series, and Kyusaku's son Ryunosuke falls head over heels in love with Nuku Nuku, occasionally encountering her super heroic alter ego, but does not learn the truth until the end of the series.

Akiko's Henchwomen Arisa and Kyouko are the same, with more significant changes to their personalities. The two have switched bodies. Arisa is now less implosive and more laid back and not as prone to violence, while Kyouko is now more aggressive and takes her job very seriously.

== All Purpose Cultural Cat Girl Nuku nuku DASH!(1998) Episode List ==
=== Episode 1 ===
A 14-year-old Ryonusuke finds an attractive woman outside rescuing a kitten. Upon return, the woman, Atsuko Higuchi, seems to be having a shelter in his house after her parents died in a car crash, as claimed by Ryonusuke's father Kyosaku. But later she gets revealed as one of the top products of Mishima Industries, escaping confinement, a so-called androbot. Ryonosuke's mom Akiko gets charged with the responsibility of taking her back forcefully or destroy her, which doesn't work as amidst the chaos Nuku nuku activated her tactical mode, destroying the attack helicopter. Despite being romantically attracted to her, Ryonusuke doesn't recognize her upon seeing her in action.

=== Episode 2 ===
During a three-day office sanctioned vacation, Ryonusuke's parents are out of the house, leaving only Ryonusuke and Nuku Nuku to watch over the house. In that time, an imperfect clone of Nuku Nuku tries to destroy/bring her back, but Nuku Nuku defeats her and ends her sad state.

=== Episode 3 ===
Mishima Industries again sends an androbot which uses flower markers to locate Nuku Nuku but fails continuously. So, in a fit of rage, it starts destroying the neighborhood Ryonusuke lives until Nuku Nuku stops her and sends her away to, supposedly to Mishima Industries. Her fate would remain unknown till the end of the series.

=== Episode 4 ===
Mishima Industries hire two very uncooperative people Arisa and Kyouko who go rogue and take the fighter plane to hunt down Nuku Nuku and fail in the process.

=== Episode 5 ===
In this episode, Nuku Nuku is detected with a sunglass like sensor and is quickly attacked with an auto controlled jet, again, which she quickly thwarts. The plan to again try this is not accepted, as it would be too costly to manufacture & market the glasses on a large scale, which makes sense as the previous attempts were pre made stuff.

=== Episode 6 ===
A cat being subjected to experimentation escapes the Mishima Industries and the reckless duo is sent to retrieve it, but they don't have any luck. Meanwhile, Nuku Nuku finds a litter of kittens and decides to adopt those and be their mother, as she's in actuality, a cat. Later while thwarting the reckless actions of the mentioned duo, Nuku Nuku finds the cat missing and realizes the cat mother has died, becoming saddened. Then the next day all the neighborhood kids seem to decide to adopt every single of those kittens to take care of them.

=== Episode 7 ===
A human experimentation subjected with the purpose of having Esper powers & getting used for named Yuko, escapes Mishima Industries with the intention of seeing a clear blue sky during a rainy day and gets found by Nuku Nuku. At the house Ryonusuke's father quickly identifies her and after, accomplishing the much-attempted Mishima server hacking, sadly, concludes that Yuko has less than 12 hours to live. When Ryonusuke hears about this he doesn't believe it and refuses to let her go until her wish gets fulfilled. But Yuko goes with them nonetheless, after wiping Ryonusuke's memories about her. Her fate would also remain unresolved till the end of the series.

=== Episode 8 ===
A synthetic bioweapon that can parasitically attach itself to any machine and then arm itself to destroy any moving thing is intentionally let loose with nefarious plot. Nuku nuku tracks down the weapon and then with the paramilitary help takes it down, saving Ryonusuke who was out there for a bike ride. Later, this plot was seemed to be hatched by the young president of the company in a malignant takeover bid.

=== Episode 9 ===
Mishima Industries and a certain other German company named Zweig decide to hold a promotional match between the top robots of both companies. The whole of town is invited. Nuku Nuku is told not to go by Kyosaku, Ryonusuke's father, but she does anyway. At the brawl, initially losing the German robot goes rogue (planned) and takes hold of the presenter lady as a hostage to use that to defeat the Japanese one. Taking quite the damage, the robot is just about to fall down, and right then Nuku Nuku offers a helping hand in defeating the adversary robot. Later, it gets revealed that Nuku Nuku sees her as a comrade because before being an androbot she, as a cat used to always hang with the robot.

=== Episode 10 ===
The young president takes over the branch and immediately foments resentment among the people of the previous administration. He then manipulates nuku nuku with the promise of revealing her true nature & history. She goes out with him at night and they reach a certain planned location where the guy reveals to her that he's also an androbot like her. Then a robot, intentionally let loose to kill the young president and be framed as an accident, attacks the duo. Initially Nuku Nnuku can't activate her life protecting tactical mode as she doesn't see any human to protect until Ryonusuke arrives on bicycle. Then she stops the robot. The higher ups flee immediately, but get killed by the young president's mole, point black. Later it is revealed that, the guy designed all this to consolidate his power in the branch and knowing the secret behind Nuku Nuku's tactical mode.

=== Episode 11 ===
Nuku Nuku's real creator comes back to her, intending to take her to Germany. He was previously thought to be dead, but his apparent detainment by Mishima Industries had ended when corporate spies from the German competitor freed him and took him to their country. Ms Akiko, Ryonusuke's mother suspecting the young president of ill motive, inform the board of executive of it, who, along with her, try to apprehend him at basement level 1 before accessing a place, which shouldn't be for the president without the consent of the board. The young guy then ousts all the guys of being clones of the founder and then subdues them with his androbot assistant. Then taking Ms Akiko hostage, he tells her about the truth of Nuku Nuku and also unfolds the exact twin of Nuku Nuku, who unlike her has the directive to kill all life, against which Nuku Nuku was created as a failsafe.

=== Episode 12 ===
In a flashback it is revealed, that, Nuku Nuku and her twin's robotic model were based on the body of the girl her creator Higuchi loved dearly. Now with the activation of the unnamed Nuku Nuku twin, the young president, who remained unnamed, intends to exact revenge on his creators on behalf of all the experimentations of Mishima Industries. Nuku Nuku tears through the hostile machine amid an army and Mishima bot battle after refusing to leave town for her loved ones. Then she saves Ms. Akiko from an attack of her sister, which kills the young president and his androbot assistant. Before confronting her twin androbot, Nuku Nuku meets Ryonusuke and finally reveal everything they had about each other. After a heartfelt goodbye, she finally faces her twin sister, who at the moment, was destroying anything trying to touch her, with her super advanced ultra strong telekinesis powers. Nuku Nuku then with tear smeared face destroys her sister, along with herself, with an intense hug strike, remembering for the last time all her loved ones, including her twin sister.

In the epilogue, after a few years, Ryonusuke, comes back & meets a grown up Noriko, in a place where he first met Nuku Nuku. There a figure appears, surprisingly resembling Nuku Nuku.

== Reception ==
The English language release of Nuku Nuku Dash was received poorly by anime reviews, obtaining an overall score of 32 out of 100 from the Meta Anime Review Project. Jason Carter of the web publication Anime Jump! stated that he hated the series. Don Houston of DVD Talk complained that the show that appeared to be much older than it really was, using concepts that were ready done to death. Carlos Ross of T.H.E.M. Anime Reviews states that "DASH has little of what made [All Purpose Cultural Cat-Girl Nuku Nuku] work - when it comes to the been-there, done-that, so-last-century action sequences. What cheapens them even further is that this series has so much potential." Reviewer Chris Beveridge of AnimeOnDVD.com, however, gave a more positive light to the series by stating that he enjoyed the series more than he has expected to since he wasn't sure what else there could be done after the original series.
