= All Purpose Cultural Cat Girl Nuku Nuku =

Japanese manga by Yuzo Takada

- English DVD cover of the first OVA

万能文化猫娘 (Bannō Bunka Nekomusume)
- Genre: Action; Comedy; Drama
- Manga
- Written by: Yuzo Takada
- Published by: Futabasha
- English publisher: NA: ADV Manga
- Magazine: Weekly Manga Action, Zoukan-Oh
- Original run: 1990 – 1991
- Volumes: 1
- Original video animation
- Directed by: Yoshio Ishiwata
- Written by: Yuzo Takada
- Studio: Animate Film
- Licensed by: NA: Discotek Media
- Released: September 21, 1992 – March 24, 1993
- Runtime: 30 minutes (each)
- Episodes: 6
- Manga

All Purpose Cultural Cat Girl Nuku Nuku (Perfect)
- Written by: Yuzo Takada
- Published by: Kadokawa Shoten
- Published: June 1993
- Volumes: 1
- Anime television series
- Directed by: Yoshitaka Fujimoto
- Written by: Hiroshi Yamaguchi
- Studio: Ashi Productions
- Licensed by: NA: Discotek Media
- Original network: TXN (TV Tokyo)
- English network: US: KTEH
- Original run: January 7, 1998 – March 25, 1998
- Episodes: 14, with two specials
- Spin-offs
- All Purpose Cultural Cat-Girl Nuku Nuku DASH!
- Manga

New All Purpose Cultural Cat Girl Nuku Nuku (Origin)
- Written by: Yuzo Takada
- Published by: Kadokawa Shoten
- Magazine: Shōnen Ace
- Published: February 1999
- Volumes: 1
- icon

All Purpose Cultural Cat Girl Nuku Nuku (Japanese: 万能文化猫娘, Hepburn: Bannō Bunka Nekomusume; lit. 'All Purpose Cultural Cat Girl') is a Japanese manga written and illustrated by Yuzo Takada. It was serialized in Weekly Manga Action for only three issues in 1991, with the three published stories later compiled in a single volume collection in December 1997. The series begins as inventor Kyūsaku Natsume transplants the brain of a cat found by his son Ryūnosuke on Christmas Eve into a schoolgirl android that he created and subsequently stole from his former employer, Mishima Heavy Industries. As a result, Nuku Nuku is a catgirl. The manga was licensed by ADV Manga and published as a single volume on August 24, 2004.

All Purpose Cultural Cat Girl Nuku Nuku has been adapted into two OVAs and one anime television series. All three anime adaptations were also licensed in North America by ADV Films. An English language version of the OVA was released by Crusader Video in the United Kingdom on VHS featuring regional accents. Discotek Media has since received the license to the OVAs, TV series and its Dash!! spin-off.

== Plot ==
The anime focuses on the custody battle for Ryūnosuke and the attempts by Akiko and Mishima Heavy Industries to reclaim Nuku Nuku's body, which often involves amusingly larger-than-life battles between Nuku Nuku and military hardware produced by Mishima Heavy Industries.

Two episodes also deal with a one-sided war between Nuku Nuku and another android named Eimi Yoshikawa, who suffers from an over-the-top inferiority complex and envies Nuku Nuku's more stable design. As it stands, Eimi was made after her and seeks to transfer her programming into Nuku Nuku to ditch her own body, which Akiko calls "a piece of junk".

=== Characters ===
- Atsuko "Nuku Nuku" Natsume – The protagonist and titular character, Nuku Nuku was a stray cat in a junkyard and joins Ryūnosuke Natsume on the run with his father, Kyūsaku. Her cat body is mortally wounded by Akiko's goons during a pursuit for Ryūnosuke. Ryou begs his father to save his cat. After some consideration her brain is transferred to the experimental android developed by Kyūsaku. In her new body she acts over-protective yet childish. "Nuku Nuku" as she is called, is capable of super-human strength, speed, and intuition, however easily distracted by stereotypical feline things like mice. Despite her cat-like instincts she shows a sincere desire to protect Ryūnosuke at any cost to herself.
- Ryūnosuke Natsume – The son of a brilliant if absent minded scientist and the over protective CEO of Japan's number one weapon's manufacturer, Ryū has the ability of squeezing in a normal life and quality time with either of his parents. He loves Nuku Nuku as a sister, but is agitated when his father brushes off her blunders as 'just being a cat' when at the same time granting her the respect and responsibilities of a human being.
- Kyūsaku Natsume – A scientist who created a prototype android with funding from his wife's company. However, with the amount of cash being dumped into the project he realized that his android would be sold off as a weapon. Having no desire to aid his wife's weapon's research he fled with his son in tow. He and his wife are not technically divorced and will still chat and bicker like any married couple when the chance arises. He created add-ons for Nuku Nuku on at least one occasion to outfit her for unique situations.
- Akiko Natsume – CEO of Japan's biggest military contractor, and an over-protective mother, Akiko aims to reclaim Ryūnosuke from her husband and capture Nuku Nuku. Despite her love of firepower, she loves Ryūnosuke and only wants to give her best for him.
- Eimi Yoshikawa – An android built in the image of the deceased granddaughter of Kyūsaku Natsume's mentor, Eimi is emotionally, mentally, and physically unstable. Built in the image of a girl around Ryū's age, Eimi's activation resulted in an explosion that killed her grandfather, leaving her legally the property of Akiko's company. She often lets her own impatience get the better things of her.
- Arisa Sono and Kyōko Ariyoshi: Akiko's two loyal henchwomen, they spearhead the attacks on Nuku Nuku and frequently suffer the consequences. Arisa is the more violent of the two and prefers to use weapons in order to get her way, something which Kyōko tries to restrain.

== Media ==
=== Manga ===
The manga is published in English by ADV Manga as a single volume and was serialized in Weekly Manga Action. It was created by Yuzo Takada and originally contained three chapters which focused on Nuku Nuku trying to be a human after her brain was transferred into an android.

=== Anime ===
Cat Girl Nuku Nuku has been adapted into two OVAs and one anime. The first OVA adaptation, All Purpose Cultural Cat Girl Nuku Nuku, was directed by Yoshio Ishiwata and released in Japan as six individual episodes on both VHS and Laserdisc from November 1992. A subtitled version of the OVA was released by A.D. Vision on May 9, 1995. Crusader Video released the OVA in the United Kingdom featuring regional accents. A scene possibly alluding to masturbation was removed prior to release.

Spanning fourteen episodes, the full anime adaptation, All Purpose Cultural Cat Girl Nuku Nuku TV, was directed by Yoshitaka Fujimoto. It premiered in Japan on January 7, 1998, and ran until March 25, 1998. It introduces new characters and makes several changes to the manga story line. The third adaptation was a 12-episode OVA series called All Purpose Cultural Cat-Girl Nuku Nuku DASH! and also directed by Yoshitaka Fujimoto. It was released on DVD in three volumes from September 23, 1998, to December 23, 1998.

All three anime adaptations were originally licensed in North America by ADV Films. Discotek Media licensed the OVA, TV Series and its Dash!! spin-off for a single-disc SDBD release on August 28, 2018, which includes Crusader Video's dub of the OVA as an added bonus.

== Reception ==
In his book Horror and Science Fiction Film IV, Donald C. Willis referred to All Purpose Cultural Cat Girl Nuku Nuku, Volume 1 as "miscalculated to be another Urusei Yatsura [...] thought it has its moments." The review also noted that "The exaggerated emotions are less amusing than wearing."

The anime entry in The Encyclopedia of Science Fiction notes that the show " was fairly amusing but does not fully engage with the themes it nods to".
