= List of 3×3 Eyes characters =

The following is a list of characters from the manga series 3×3 Eyes, written and illustrated by Yuzo Takada.

== Protagonists ==
Pai (パイ, Pai) / Parvati IV (パールバティー四世, Pārubatī Yonsei)
Voiced by: Megumi Hayashibara (Japanese); Rebecca Forstadt (Pai), Alexandra Kenworthy (Sanjiyan) (Streamline/Orion), Wendee Lee (Sanjiyan) (Orion), Brigitte Bako (Pioneer) (English)
The last surviving Sanjiyan Unkara who was discovered by Yakumo's father in Tibet. Yuzo Takada sometimes calls her the three-eyed elf girl from China, but she wears traditional Tibetan clothes. As is typical with members of her race, she developed a split personality as she grew older to cope with the problems of an exceptionally long life. However, Pai is the only Sanjiyan ever shown that has true multiple personality disorder. Her first personality, called Pai in the series, has the appearance of a normal human and is that of a cheerful and naive girl. The second personality, that of Parvati IV, usually arises when Pai is defenseless, endangered, or emotionally overcome.
The presence of the Sanjiyan in Pai is distinguishable because the normally invisible third eye in her forehead opens when Parvati awakens. Most characters refer to her as Sanjiyan when she's in that state. Sanjiyan is more rigid and stoic than Pai and is able to use powerful magic, unlike her first personality. However, using those powers is draining to the Sanjiyan and requires them to rest, leaving them exposed to danger. Her split personality is a possible reference to the Hindu goddess Parvati, who had many identities, each with their own personalities. Volume 32 introduces a clone of hers, named Kali. In Hindu mythology, Kali was an immensely powerful and bloodthirsty battle goddess and one of Parvati's many identities.
Pai can absorb a human soul to do her bidding, transforming the person affected into a nearly invulnerable servant. She has other mystical powers usually manifested along with the appearance of her third eye, and used by her Parvati identity. Older Sanjiyans often become evil, decadent and uncaring; younger ones tend to have split personalities. Three-hundred-year-old Pai is an example of a younger Sanjiyan: her Pai personality is somewhat flaky, caring, and cheerful, while her Parvati personality is more arrogant and ruthless. The two personae are aware of one another and sometimes talk between themselves.
Believing herself to be the last of her kind, Pai seeks to become human through the use of the Ningen no Zō, the Statue of Humanity, which reputably has the power to turn a Sanjiyan into a mortal, by transferring the powers of two of the race into a third member. The Ningen, incidentally, is how the other members of her kind reputedly became human and thus died out. Pai has been shown to have feelings for Yakumo.
Yakumo Fujii (藤井 八雲, Fujii Yakumo)
Voiced by: Kōji Tsujitani (Japanese); Eddie Frierson (Streamline/Orion), Christian Campbell (Pioneer) (English)
The primary male protagonist, he became Pai's Wu and companion when a rampaging Takuhi, Pai's demon friend, fatally wounded him. Before he could die, Pai merged his soul with her own, transforming him into a Wu, which in turn made him immortal as long as Pai lives. He can feel pain but he won't die. He will regenerate from any wound, no matter how severe.
His father, Professor Fujii, was an archaeology professor and would-be monster hunter, who visited Tibet to research the legends of the immortal Sanjiyans. There he met Pai, a relatively youthful member of that mythical race, and he made a promise to help her become human. However, he fell ill while trying to depart the Chinese province of Yunnan and died shortly after completing a letter to his son, asking him to take over helping Pai with her quest. Yakumo tries to keep that promise. Yakumo has been shown to have feelings for Pai.
Takuhi (橐𩇯 (Note: The second kanji consists of 非 on the top and 巴 on the bottom. It does not exist in many fonts.) or タクヒ)
Parvati's pet bird that's responsible for the events that led Yakumo into becoming Parvati's undead Wu. He's killed by one of Kaiyanwang's followers while they're trying to find Steve Long and Mei Ling Ling.
Jake McDonald
Voiced by: Hōchū Ōtsuka (Japanese); Steve Blum (Orion), Gregg Rainwater (Pioneer) (English)
A treasure hunter looking for the secret of immortality that Sanjiyans keep.
Haan Hazrat (ハズラット・ハーン, Hazuratto Hān)
A merchant who offers magic. He's a human of Pakistani descent and uses magic to defend himself against demons. He first appears in volume 8 of the manga to settle a debt with Yakumo Fujii. Ends up romantically involved with Yōko Ayanokōji.
Yōko Ayanokōji (綾小路 葉子, Ayanokōji Yōko) / Hōashio (化蛇)
The snake demon that was sealed within Parvati's body from volumes 3-5; she returns in volume 12 with a new body and identity. She's a water-based demon with the power to manipulate water at will, with deadly results. Ends up in love with Haan Hazrat.

== Supporting ==
Chen Aguri (陳 亜栗)
The chief editor and founder of Yougekisha. He's turned into stone after getting a little too close to the demon world, but is revived later. His main interest is to study the Sanjiyan Unkara so that he can write a great article for his magazine.
Lee Ling Ling (李 鈴鈴, Ri Rinrin)
Voiced by: Ai Orikasa (Japanese); Joyce Kurtz (Streamline), Susan Chesler (Pioneer) (English)
Yougekisha's editor in Chen Aguri's absence. At first, she's reluctant to believe in the occult, but traveling with Yakumo and Pai has led her to change her attitude. She's since become extremely interested in the subject, if only to make money off of publishing material for the magazine.
Meixing Long (龍 美星, Ron Meishin)
Voiced by: Mayumi Tanaka (Japanese); Lia Sargent (Streamline), Erin Matthews (Pioneer) (English)
The sister of Steve Long, she meets Pai and Yakumo when looking to save her brother from kidnappers. She's an excellent martial artist.
Steve Long (スティーブ 龍, Sutību Ron)
Voiced by: Banjō Ginga (Japanese); Steve Bulen (Streamline), Bill Fagerbakke (Pioneer) (English)
A Taoist and a regular human, he's quite skilled at using paper charms and can sense demonic energy.

== Antagonists ==
Kaiyanwang (鬼眼王, Kaiyanwan) / Shiva
The strongest Sanjiyan. His ambitions drove him to wage war against the rest of the Sanjiyan Unkara, which ultimately led them to their fate. He was sealed away by Parvati IV after a bloody struggle. While the names Shiva and Kaiyanwan are normally used essentially interchangeably, more correctly, they represent two aspects of the same individual. The Shiva personality sacrificed itself to prevent Kaiyanwang from killing Parvati centuries prior to the main story.
Benares (ベナレス, Benaresu)
Voiced by: Akio Ōtsuka (Japanese); David Povall (Streamline), Kirk Thornton (Orion), Earl Boen (Pioneer) (English)
The Wu of Kaiyanwang. He assumed command of Kaiyanwang's demons after his master was sealed away by Parvati. He's spent the last 300 years searching for ways to revive Kaiyanwang from his sealed prison. Before becoming a Wu, Benares was a powerful dragon monster who consumed various holy demons. This allowed him to absorb enough intelligence to eventually transform himself into the humanoid being we see today. Even before the Wu transformation, he was tremendously powerful, with the added power he became virtually unstoppable. Benares is a highly powerful figure within the demon world physically, magically, and politically, and strikes fear into even the bravest of souls.
Chōkai (呪鬼)
Voiced by: Yuusaku Yara (Japanese); Kirk Thornton (Orion), Ralph Lister (Pioneer) (English)
A servant of Benares that commands a sizable range of demons including Hong-nyang, to whom he refers as Ran Pao Pao. He knows how to fight using magic talismans enchanted with celestial calligraphy, demonstrating explosive attacks and imprisoning spells. Chōkai is also a skilled martial artist, despite his chunky size, and possesses two forms. The first is a normal Chinese human with a whisker-like moustache, donning a heavy trench coat with a fedora hat and round dark spectacles. His other form is a larger, muscular demon (though he still keeps his glasses and whiskers) with long teeth who can devour others by opening his body exposing the tentacles and negative space within. Because he has knowledge on using magic circles, Benares charges Chōkai with finding and destroying keys and entrances (named Konron) into the world that the Sanjiyan inhabited, the seichi (literally translates to "holy land"). In the anime, Choukai has a disturbing chuckle.
Ran Pao Pao (狼暴暴)
Voiced by: Yūko Nagashima (Japanese); Dina Sherman (Pioneer) (English)
A demon enforcer under Chōkai's command. Normally appears as an 8-foot (2.4 m) tall muscular and pale skinned woman with flared red hair, long teeth, and completely red eyes. She can also grow an extra limb from underneath each of her arms and can deceptively change form into a small child that resembles a super deformed version of her normal form. After Chōkai's death Ran Pao Pao becomes one of Pai's servants.
