= Gun Blaze West =

Manga series by Nobuhiro Watsuki

- First tankōbon volume cover
- Genre: Adventure, comedy, Western
- Manga
- Written by: Nobuhiro Watsuki
- Published by: Shueisha
- English publisher: NA: Viz Media
- Imprint: Jump Comics
- Magazine: Weekly Shōnen Jump
- Original run: December 11, 2000 – July 31, 2001
- Volumes: 3
- icon

Gun Blaze West (stylized in all caps) is a Japanese manga series written and illustrated by Nobuhiro Watsuki. It was serialized in Shueisha's shōnen manga magazine Weekly Shōnen Jump from December 2000 to July 2001, with its chapters collected in three tankōbon volumes. The story follows Viu Bannes, a young gunfighter on his journey towards Gun Blaze West, the place where the greatest gunmen go to test their strength. Viz Media published the series in English in North America.

== Plot ==
In the American West, Gun Blaze West is a fabled sanctuary, a place beyond the reach of law and outlaw alike where all may live free from violence. The journey to this legend is only possible once every decade during the Zero Year, and travelers must first obtain a Sign to the West, a pass bearing the sanctuary's unique insignia that is only valid in the year it is acquired.

The quest begins for Viu Bannes, a young boy who wins a gun belt in an arm-wrestling match. He is trained by a wandering drifter named Marcus Homer, who promises Viu that once he can run to a distant cliff before sunset, he will be strong enough to attempt the journey. When their town is attacked by the Kenbrown Gang, Marcus is killed in a duel with the leader. Viu avenges his mentor and discovers a Sign to the West and a partial map hidden within Marcus's revolver, vowing to complete the pilgrimage.

Five years later, Viu departs for the West. In St. Louis, he meets Will Johnston, the bouncer of a struggling saloon, who possesses a compass also marked with the Sign. After Viu helps defeat the thugs threatening Will's business and uses a reward to pay off his debt, Will agrees to join the quest. Their journey leads them to a traveling circus where they encounter Colice, a Japanese knife-wielder who fled her homeland after the Boshin War. After aiding the circus ringmaster against a violent former partner, Colice elects to travel with Viu and Will.

The trio arrives in Fort Smith, Arkansas, where they are to meet a guide on a specific date. There, they have a strange encounter with an eccentric, heavily armored man known as Armor Baron. When the guide appears, it is revealed to be the Baron himself, who declares they must defeat him or his men to earn their passage. Viu chooses to battle the Baron directly. During their fight, Viu employs his ultimate technique, Concentration One, which destroys both the Baron's Gun Sack device and his own cherished revolver. Victorious, Viu secures passage for his group. They are assigned a new guide and Viu is seeded first among all candidates for the final leg of the journey to the legendary sanctuary.

== Characters ==
=== Main characters ===
Viu Bannes (ビュー・バンズ, Byū Banzu)
Viu is a cheerful, optimistic, and adventurous nine-year-old boy who dreams of becoming a gunman. He acts before he thinks and, because of his rash nature, takes on risky challenges without considering the consequences. Viu is determined to become Marcus Homer's apprentice in order to become strong enough to make the journey with him to Gun Blaze West. But after Homer is killed in a duel against Ken Brown, Viu is forced to train on his own and his journey to the West doesn't begin until five years later. His weapon is a pistol, inherited from Marcus homer, that has an enhances cartridge dispenser, as well as a Sign to the west on the hilt. He demonstrates remarkable ingenuity with the weapon. He teaches himself to "fan", discovers that the hard edges can be used to club someone, and learns to fight by recoiling the hot, spent cartridges after using up the bullets.
Will Johnston (ウィル・ジョンストン, Wiru Jonsuton)
Will first encountered Viu in a bar in St. Louis, where he was working as a bouncer and promptly threw both him and Target Kevin out for causing a disturbance. Will lives with his little sister in a small cabin (which was later burned down by Kevin in retaliation for the earlier incident). Later on, after defeating Target Kevin, he joins Viu in his quest to fulfill his father's dream of finding Gun Blaze West. Will is unique in that he uses a lasso as his weapon of choice instead of firearms, with his two named techniques being "Wave" (flicking a 'wave' of rope at Target Kevin's eyes) and "Tendril" (which he used four ropes to grab all of Kevin's limbs and shattered them with a powerful tug). In his training to master his "Rope Special", Will gained incredible arm strength, allowing him to toss around his opponents like weightless ragdolls when they are collared by his lassoes. He carries a trick compass that points west, with a Sign to the West emblazoned upon it. He was described as the more intellectual of the three main characters, calculating and thinking things through where the others tend to act impulsively. His intellect is proven when he states that he has memorized his father's books to the point where he can remember all that he's read from them. It is possible that he possesses a photographic memory.
Colice Satoh (コリス・サトー, Korisu Satō)
Colice is the daughter of a family of samurai. She works as an acrobat and knifethrower for Robert Rodriguez's circus to repay him for taking her under his wing. Colice teaches Viu "Concentration One", a special eye technique to focus his aim better.

=== Antagonists ===
William Kenbrown
The first villain encountered in the series. Responsible for wounding Marcus Homer and apparently killing him, which set Viu off on his quest. Nobuhiro Watsuki acknowledged that he should have been spiced up more. He and his gang ravaged the state of Arkansas before being driven up to Winston Town. He is such an expert he can handle the local militia without even firing his gun (he hides behind his horse while they shoot, throws a whiskey bomb into the midst, and throws a set of Cartridges into the fire; while handling Marcus in a duel, he uses wrist knives to feint Marcus before shooting him twice in the torso and once in the head).
Target Kevin
An insane looking gunman who uses special sextuple-barreled shotguns to cause as much destruction as possible without regard for bystanders or property damage. After setting fire to the Johnston place to draw will out, he Fought Viu in a special "Target Fight" match, where both participants paint bull's eyes on their bodies and win by hitting their opponent's bull's eye first.
Carlo
Target Kevin's employer, the owner of the Bella Donna Saloon, he says Will's employer's Saloon is an eyesore, so he hires thugs to harass the Saloon. He tolerates all sorts of things within the Bella Donna. After Winning the Target game, Viu destroys the Saloon with the special guns provided. Carlo is known to be very generous with his money, offering will and Viu 20 times Kevin's pay, with many fringe benefits, casually.
Guallarripa (ガラリッパ, Gararippa)
Ex-partner of Robert Rodriguez and Father of Uno and Dos (which are also his teammates on his journey). His weapon of choice is the shield-pistol, that he wears under his hat.
Uno and Dos
Guallaripa's twin sons who are determined to help their father on his journey. Uno uses a pair of large spurs as a pair of roller skates which grant him increased speed and an added edge to his kicking attacks, while Dos uses a large circular disc as a razor edge throwing disc for long range attacks.
Sarge Thunderarm (サージ・サンダーアーム, Sāji Sandāāmu)
As a United States Army Cavalry soldier, Sarge was once noted to have fought nonstop for 3 days and 3 nights, averaging 10,000 rounds per day. He had no qualms about killing enemy soldiers even if they had surrendered or have been taken as prisoners of war. He was believed dead after he took a hit from a cannonball, but was rebuilt as a cyborg in service of the U.S. government in order to find Gun Blaze West, on orders of the President. He was meant to be the first Super Soldier.

=== Other characters ===
Cissy Bannes
Viu's older sister and the school teacher of his hometown. She despises weapons. Marcus had a crush on her.
Marcus Homer (マーカス・ホーマー, Mākasu Hōmā)
Viu's mentor who taught him the skills needed to make it to Gun Blaze West. Believed to have been gunned down by Bill Kenbrown.
Carol Johnston
Will's helpful kid sister. She at one point risks her life to rescue Will's compass when Kevin set fire to their house. The creator acknowledged that she turned out very weak.
Robert Rodriguez (ロバート・ロドリゲス, Robāto Rodorigesu)
Circus owner. Robert is Guallaripa's former partner; their relationship ended when they caused a town's destruction and caused the deaths of a mother and daughter. Robert possess incredible strength as well as the ability to catch bullets with his bare hands. He was formerly a strong outlaw in the Territory of Utah, known as the "Western Phantom."
Armor Baron (アーマーバロン, Āmā Baron)
The First Messenger of Gun Blaze West. It is his duty to eliminate the weaker candidates to ensure the strongest make it to the next stage of the journey. His armor, Siegfried, is a special model with a built in rocket pack to give it short bursts of incredible speed, effectively turning him into a human missile. Viu manages to pierce his armor, thus earning his respect and a new Sign To West to continue his journey.
J.J.
A cocky gunman traveling to Gun Blaze West with his gang. Carries specialized bullets named Drill Lock to penetrate the armor worn by Armor Baron's men. "J.J." stands for Jesse James. He is the head of J.J.'s Gang (J・J'sギャング, J.J.'s Gyangu).
Jim
One of J.J.'s Gang. His full name is Jim Younger.
Myra
One of J.J.'s Gang and one of the only two female Gunman searching for Gun Blaze West. In real life she is Myra Maybelle Shirley Reed Starr (alias Belle Star).

== Production ==
Gun Blaze West was written and illustrated by Nobuhiro Watsuki, who began working on it after the completion of his previous manga Rurouni Kenshin in 1999. Watsuki became inspired to write a manga about the American frontier upon visiting the Arizona desert and seeing its wild cacti.

Watsuki revealed in an interview with One Piece author Eiichiro Oda, who briefly worked for him as an assistant on Rurouni Kenshin, that he had considered making a one-eyed protagonist for Gun Blaze West. However, to avoid accusations of plagiarism from the media, Watsuki scrapped the idea when he found out that Oda had early plans to have his One Piece character Roronoa Zoro lose an eye at some point in that manga. Watsuki intentionally shortened the overall dimensions of his characters in Gun Blaze West, a technique he carried over while drawing children in his next manga Buso Renkin.

== Publication ==
Written and illustrated by Nobuhiro Watsuki, Gun Blaze West was serialized in Shueisha's shōnen manga magazine Weekly Shōnen Jump from December 11, 2000, (Note: It started in Weekly Shōnen Jump #2 of 2001 (cover date January 8, 2001), released on December 11, 2000.) to July 31, 2001. (Note: It finished in Weekly Shōnen Jump #35 of 2001 (cover date August 13, 2001), released on July 31 of the same year.) Shueisha collected its chapters in three tankōbon volumes published from June 4 to November 2, 2001. Shueisha re-released the series in a two-volume bunkoban edition from August 18 to September 16, 2011.

In North America, Viz Media announced the acquisition of the manga in July 2007. The three volumes were published from April 1 to October 7, 2008. The series is also available to read on the Shonen Jump app and website.

=== Volumes ===
No.	Original release date	Original ISBN	English release date	English ISBN
1	June 4, 2001	4-08-873128-X	April 1, 2008	978-1-4215-1806-0
2	September 4, 2001	4-08-873163-8	July 1, 2008	978-1-4215-1807-7
3	November 2, 2001	4-08-873189-1	October 7, 2008	978-1-4215-1808-4

== Reception ==
Gun Blaze West was generally panned. Specifically, the hook was panned for being uninteresting, with multiple reviewers saying if they had been reading it weekly in Weekly Shōnen Jump, they probably would not have read beyond the first chapters. Later parts of the story were panned for being the typical shōnen plot. One reviewer even said the manga feels like "Ash Ketchum get your gun". In contrast to that, the final fight was generally praised for being an intense, over the top fight, perfect for the premature ending.

The art was generally given mixed reviews with some critics praising it for being clean, crisp, and simple, while criticizing it for not trying anything new or spending time to appreciate the backgrounds. Carlo Santos from Anime News Network panned the art at the start, saying it felt like Watsuki had no idea what to draw. He also noted that while some characters look great in battle, out of battle they look impractical. However, he praised the angular art saying that it made it easy to follow the action from panel to panel.

The characters were generally given mixed reviews. Some critics, like David Rasmussen from Manga Life praised the characters, calling them likeable. Other critics, like Ed Sizemore from Comics Worth Reading panned the main character, Viu, calling him "one note". However, he praised the secondary cast, specifically their involvement in the plot.
