= Yuzo Takada =

Japanese manga artist (born 1963)

- 高田 裕三
- Born: Yūji Takada (高田 裕次); March 21, 1963 (age 63); Edogawa, Tokyo, Japan
- Occupation: Manga artist
- Notable work: 3×3 Eyes; Blue Seed; All Purpose Cultural Cat Girl Nuku Nuku
- Awards: Kodansha Manga Award (Shōnen) for 3×3 Eyes (1993)

Yuzo Takada (高田裕三, Takada Yūzō; born March 21, 1963 in Edogawa, Tokyo) is the pseudonym of Yūji Takada (高田裕次, Takada Yūji), a popular Japanese manga artist. He worked as an assistant for manga artist Fujihiko Hosono before starting his career as an original author. His first work appeared in November 1983 in Young Magazine, and his first series Tokonatsu Bank started in that publication in January 1984 and ran until February 1985.

Takada is better known for his supernatural manga 3×3 Eyes and Blue Seed, and for the comedy-action manga All Purpose Cultural Cat Girl Nuku Nuku. The anime versions of these series all star voice-actress Megumi Hayashibara. In 1993, he won the Kodansha Manga Award for shōnen for 3×3 Eyes.

Takada has also worked on character design and illustration for video games, including Enix's Just Breed.

== Selected bibliography ==
- Shūshoku Beginner (1983)
- Endless Summer Bank aka Tokonatsu Bank (January 2, 1984 – February 18, 1985)
- Tour Conductor, Nikumori (March 3, 1985 – September 1, 1986)
- Sportion KIDs (November 17, 1986 – November 2, 1987)
- Every Day Is Sunday (November 13, 1987 – February 10, 1989)
- 3×3 Eyes (December 14, 1987–2002)
- Toritsuki-kun (February 1989 – March 1991)
- All Purpose Cultural Cat Girl Nuku Nuku (1990)
- Blue Seed (1992–1995)
- The New All-Purpose Cultural Cat Girl Nuku Nuku (1997–1998)
- Genzō Hitogata Kiwa (1997–2004)
- Tsukumo Nemuru Shizume (2004–2006)
- Little Jumper (July 2004 – August 2008)
- Ultraman: The First (2004–2008)
- 3×3 Eyes Gaiden (2009–2010)
- Captain Alice (2009–2013)
- Lunfor (2013)
- 3×3 Eyes: Genjū no Mori no Sōnansha (2014–2016)
- 3×3 Eyes: Kiseki no Yami no Keiyakusha (2016–2023)
- Mugō no Schnell Gear: Chikyūgai Kikōka AI (2019–ongoing)
