= Buso Renkin =

Japanese manga series by Nobuhiro Watsuki

- First tankōbon volume cover, featuring Tokiko Tsumura (left) and Kazuki Muto

武装錬金 (Busō Renkin)
- Genre: Adventure; Science fiction; Supernatural
- Manga
- Written by: Nobuhiro Watsuki
- Published by: Shueisha
- English publisher: NA/UK: Viz Media
- Imprint: Jump Comics
- Magazine: Weekly Shōnen Jump
- Original run: June 23, 2003 – April 25, 2005
- Volumes: 10
- Anime television series
- Directed by: Takao Kato
- Produced by: Hiroyuki Yonemasu; Makoto Ōyoshi; Nobuhiro Nakayama; Shin'ichi Ikeda
- Written by: Akatsuki Yamatoya
- Music by: Kohei Tanaka
- Studio: Xebec
- Licensed by: AUS: Madman Entertainment; NA: Viz Media; UK: Manga Entertainment
- Original network: TXN (TV Tokyo)
- English network: NA: Neon Alley; SEA: Animax; US: Funimation Channel
- Original run: October 5, 2006 – March 29, 2007 (Note: The official website of Buso Renkin informs episodes aired between October 4, 2006, and March 28, 2007 at the 25:00 AM timeslot. This, technically, means that the show was broadcast always a day later than what is featured on the site.)
- Episodes: 26
- Light novel
- Written by: Kaoru Kurosaki
- Illustrated by: Nobuhiro Watsuki
- Published by: Shueisha
- Imprint: Jump J-Books
- Original run: October 30, 2006 – May 25, 2007
- Volumes: 2
- icon

Buso Renkin (Japanese: 武装錬金, Hepburn: Busō Renkin; lit. transl. "Alchemical Weapons") is a Japanese manga series written and illustrated by Nobuhiro Watsuki. It was serialized in publisher Shueisha's shōnen manga magazine Weekly Shōnen Jump magazine from June 2003 to April 2005. The individual chapters were republished by Shueisha in ten tankōbon (bound volumes). It follows Kazuki Muto, who becomes an alchemical warrior in the battle against alchemical monsters known as homunculi. Watsuki envisioned the manga as his last shōnen manga, and then he tried to do as much as he could with that genre. The series has been licensed by Viz Media for North American release.

The manga has been adapted into an anime television series, which was produced by studio Xebec and was broadcast on Japanese television network TV Tokyo from 2006 to 2007. In December 2007, the anime was announced for North American DVD release by Viz Media. In 2009, the series made its American television debut on the Funimation Channel, with American broadcast rights acquired by Funimation from Viz Media. The series has also spawned two drama CDs, two light novels, a PlayStation 2 video game, and many types of Buso Renkin-themed merchandise.

In Japan, the Buso Renkin manga has sold over 3 million volumes and was nominated for the science fiction works focused Seiun Award. It received a mixed reception from manga and anime publications. Watsuki's art received the most positive comments from reviewers, while other aspects of the manga, such as its action and characters, have divided critics' opinions. The anime, which critics described as a generic shōnen fighting series, received mostly negative reception.

== Plot ==
The series follows Kazuki Muto, who saves Tokiko Tsumura and is killed by an alchemical monster known as a homunculus. Tokiko, an alchemist warrior, feels responsible and revives him by replacing his destroyed heart with a kakugane (核鉄). The kakugane is an alchemical device which, when activated, takes a weapon form based on its user's personality, forming a buso renkin—the only thing that can destroy a homunculus. Kazuki creates his own buso renkin and joins Tokiko in the fight against the homunculi and their master, Koushaku Chouno. Chouno, who has renamed himself "Papillon", is killed by Kazuki, but is later resurrected by the L.X.E., a humanoid homunculi group led by Chouno's great-great-grandfather Bakushaku Chouno, now calling himself Dr. Butterfly. In various battles, Kazuki, Tokiko and Captain Bravo (their team leader) destroy most of the L.X.E.'s members. After learning that Dr. Butterfly believes him to be weak and useless, Papillon rebels against the L.X.E. and kills Dr. Butterfly.

Before his death, Dr. Butterfly drains the energy of the students at Kazuki's school to heal and revive Victor, a being superior to humans and homunculi. Victor is confronted by Kazuki, but Victor is not interested in fighting and leaves. During the battle, however, Kazuki's kakugane is revealed to be the same type as the Victor's—a black kakugane created by the Alchemist Army as a prototype to the philosopher's stone. The black kakugane absorbs human life forces; to prevent this from happening, Kazuki's death is ordered by the Alchemist Army. Captain Bravo tries to kill Kazuki, but Tokiko finds him alive. A team is commissioned to confirm Kazuki's death, but Kazuki, Tokiko and Gouta Nakamura (an Alchemist Warrior and former protégé of Tokiko's) fight their way past the members of the Re-Extermination Squad. Later, Kazuki's death is postponed because, as the Alchemists' leader explains, their top priority is to defeat Victor.

Kazuki and Tokiko find the white kakugane, which can negate the effects of the black kakugane and is guarded by Victor's daughter Victoria, who is herself a humanoid homunculus. During the Alchemist Army's final battle against Victor, Kazuki applies the white kakugane to Victor, but it only weakens him. To protect humankind from both of them, Kazuki propels himself and Victor to the moon. Later, Papillion creates a white kakugane to heal Kazuki. The Alchemist Army rescues Kazuki, creates another white kakugane and restores Victor's humanity. Reunited with his daughter, Victor asks the Alchemist Army to turn him into a homunculus and tells them that he and his daughter will lead all the homunculi to the moon. The Alchemist Army dedicates itself to research a way to revert homunculi back into humans, ending their war activities. All Warriors abdicate their kakugane. Kazuki and Tokiko return to their daily lives together while Papillon becomes an urban legend throughout Japan.

== Production ==
Nobuhiro Watsuki started writing Buso Renkin thinking it would be his last shōnen manga; he tried to do "everything [he] ever wanted" with that genre. He unexpectedly experienced problems drawing the manga's fight scenes and said he "struggled with the comedic elements". Watsuki drew references from several sources in Buso Renkin; from his past works Rurouni Kenshin and Gun Blaze West to American comics, and from films to other anime and manga. Despite dealing with alchemy, Watsuki initially avoided mentioning the philosopher's stone because he thought he could be accused of plagiarizing another series. He could not omit mentioning it, but he said that it is "general knowledge". During the series' publication, Watsuki had four severe colds; the fourth cold made him so weak that he could not finish the chapter he was due to send to Weekly Shōnen Jump.

== Manga ==
The chapters of Buso Renkin were written and illustrated by Nobuhiro Watsuki and were serialized in Shueisha's shōnen magazine Weekly Shōnen Jump from June 23, 2003, to April 25, 2005. (Note: Published until the magazine's combined 21st–22nd issue of 2005 (cover date May 9), released on April 25 of that same year.) The first 79 chapters were serialized in Weekly Shōnen Jump; the final chapter was published in another magazine from Shueisha in two installments. Shueisha published the individual chapters in a series of ten tankōbon (collected volumes), which were released between January 5, 2004, and April 4, 2006.

In North America, Viz Media released the manga's ten tankōbon volumes between August 1, 2006, and February 5, 2008. In March 2012, Viz also made the manga available digitally through its Viz Manga App for the iPad and other iOS devices.

The manga has been licensed in Brazil by Editora JBC, France by Glénat, in Germany by Tokyopop Germany, in Italy by Panini Comics, and in Spain by Planeta DeLibros.

== Anime adaptation ==
In Japan, the Buso Renkin manga was adapted into an anime series which ran on TV Tokyo; it was directed by Takao Kato, written by Akatsuki Yamatoya, and produced by Xebec. Buso Renkin aired for 26 episodes between October 5, 2006, and March 29, 2007. The episodes were later released by Geneon Universal Entertainment in nine DVD compilations between January 25, 2007, and September 21, 2007. DVD box sets containing all twenty-six episodes were released on November 26, 2009, and on February 27, 2013. Geneon Universal Entertainment released an animation soundtrack CD for Buso Renkin on January 25, 2007.

On December 8, 2007, Viz Media announced the release of the English dub, which would be released in two DVD sets of thirteen episodes each. The first set containing episodes one to thirteen was released on April 29, 2008. The second set containing episodes fourteen to twenty-six was released on October 7, 2008. Funimation launched Buso Renkin on their Funimation Channel on April 27, 2009, marking the series' American television debut. On December 20, 2009, the first three episodes from the series were officially uploaded to Hulu and Viz Media's portal. Two episodes were uploaded weekly thereafter; the final episode was uploaded on March 8, 2010. Beginning on October 2, 2012, Buso Renkin was streamed on Neon Alley. Manga Entertainment released the series in the United Kingdom on two DVD box sets between August 11, 2008, and October 6, 2008, and later rereleased on a "complete series" edition on June 8, 2009. Madman Entertainment released two DVD box sets of the series in the PAL region between May 20, 2009, and August 19, 2009. In October 2017, Tubi TV added Buso Renkin to its catalogue.

== Related media ==
Shueisha released two drama CDs for Buso Renkin. The first CD was released on May 26, 2005, and the second CD was released on October 6, 2006. It also released two "Expert CDs", which features the radio drama, opening and ending themes and unreleased soundtrack songs. The first CD, Expert CD 1, was released on March 28, 2007. The second CD, Expert CD 2, was released on June 8, 2007.

Two light novels were written by Kaoru Kurosaki, illustrated by Watsuki, and published under the Jump J-Books imprint by Shueisha. The first one, Buso Renkin Double Slash (武装錬金//), was published on October 31, 2006, and Buso Renkin Slash Zeta (武装錬金/Z) was released on May 25, 2007. A guidebook titled Buso Renkin Infinity was published by Shueisha on May 2, 2007.

Two Nintendo DS fighting games, Jump Super Stars and Jump Ultimate Stars, have featured characters from the series with only Kazuki being its sole playable character. A PlayStation 2 hack and slash video game developed and published by Marvelous Entertainment was released on June 28, 2007, under the title Buso Renkin - Welcome to Papillon Park (武装錬金 ようこそパピヨンパークへ, Buso Renkin Youkoso Papillon Park e). In Japan, action figures, T-shirts, a trading card game series, key chains, straps, and a variety of other products were sold as merchandise for the series.

== Reception ==
=== Public response and awards ===
In Japan, Buso Renkin has sold over three million volumes. In North America, the first volume has featured in the best-selling graphic novel ranking of Nielsen BookScan, and the fourth volume of the series was the seventh best-selling comic book of March 2007, according to Publishers Weekly. In the same year, it was nominated for the Seiun Award for best science fiction comic title of the year.

=== Critical response ===
The manga's critical reaction has been mixed. Most critics reached a consensus regarding the high quality of its art, describing it as "crisp", "solid", and "clean and well done". Other aspects of the series have divided critics' opinions. Manga Life's Michael Aronson praised the enemy designs, while Carlo Santos of Anime News Network (ANN) criticized them, adding the series "is not much fun to read, and certainly no fun to look at". Writing for Active Anime, Sandra Scholes found points of interest in the series' story, and praised its action. Santos said the action "got all the drive and excitement of shōnen action", and Comic Book Bin's Leroy Douresseaux called the series "a mixture of Dragon Ball Z and Naruto, but filled with even more weirdness".

Aronson said the storytelling and action needed "clarity". Leigh Dragoon from Sequential Tart described Buso Renkin as "derivative" and "hackneyed", and called the characters "completely forgettable". Conversely, Patti Martinson writing for the same site said that they "are distinctive and interesting". Martinson noted "the complexity of the plot", though she said it is not difficult to follow. She added there was "a lot of strong material" that can be developed throughout the series. Holly Ellingwood praised the final volume, stating that Watsuki did "a fabulous job of covering all fronts and the various characters, juggling them effectively" and that it ends "in an amazing way".

The anime was met with mostly negative critical reception. ANN critic Zac Bertschy said Buso Renkin "isn't anything special", criticizing the "threadbare plot exposition" and its clichés, but praised the way it "get[s] right to the action". Writing for ANN, Luke Carroll stated the series is generic and that it became "[a] bit more tolerable ... during its light-hearted moments". Although ANN's Carl Kimlinger said the anime follows the "shōnen fighting formula", he praised Tokiko's characterization, saying it is one characteristic that distinguish the series. Kimlinger also praised the way it "improves considerably" because of its twists in the plot. UK Anime Network's Andy Hanley also called it "generic" at the start, but said it "has a fairly decent stab" in the second half. Chris Beveridge of Mania praised the balance between the humor and the "lighter side", and stated that Buso Renkin "took the clichés and obviousness of ideas and ran with it in an engaging and fun manner".
