= 3×3 Eyes =

Japanese manga series by Yuzo Takada

- Cover of the first tankōbon volume, featuring Pai (top) and Yakumo Fujii (bottom)
- Genre: Adventure; Dark fantasy; Romance
- Manga
- Written by: Yuzo Takada
- Published by: Kodansha
- English publisher: NA: Studio Proteus (former); Dark Horse Comics
- Magazine: Young Magazine Kaizokuban (1987–1989); Weekly Young Magazine (1989–2002)
- English magazine: NA: Super Manga Blast!
- Original run: December 1987 – August 2002
- Volumes: 40
- Original video animation
- Directed by: Daisuke Nishio; Kazuhisa Takenōchi (3)
- Produced by: Hidetoshi Shigematsu (#1); Shigeru Watanabe (#1); Ryōhei Suzuki (#1); Katsunori Haruta (#2–4); Minoru Takanashi (#2–4); Toshimichi Ōtsuki (#2–4); Yoshimasa Mizuo (#2–4)
- Written by: Akinori Endō
- Music by: Kaoru Wada
- Studio: Toei Animation
- Licensed by: UK: Manga Entertainment; US: Streamline Pictures; Orion Home Video; Pioneer Entertainment
- Released: July 25, 1991 – March 19, 1992
- Runtime: 30 minutes (each)
- Episodes: 4
- Original video animation

Legend of the Divine Demon
- Directed by: Kazuhisa Takenōchi
- Produced by: Shigeru Watanabe; Yoshimasa Mizuo; Kōji Shimana
- Written by: Kazuhisa Takenōchi; Yuzo Takada
- Music by: Kaoru Wada
- Studio: Studio Junio
- Licensed by: UK: Manga Entertainment; US: Orion Home Video; Pioneer Entertainment
- Released: July 25, 1995 – June 25, 1996
- Runtime: 46–51 minutes (each)
- Episodes: 3
- Manga

3×3 Eyes: Genjū no Mori no Sōnansha
- Written by: Yuzo Takada
- Published by: Kodansha
- Magazine: e Young Magazine
- Original run: December 26, 2014 – August 12, 2016
- Volumes: 4
- Manga

3×3 Eyes: Kiseki no Yami no Keiyakusha
- Written by: Yuzo Takada
- Published by: Kodansha
- Magazine: e Young Magazine; (2016–2018); Monthly Young Magazine; (2019–2023)
- Original run: December 22, 2016 – May 18, 2023
- Volumes: 8
- icon

3×3 Eyes (Note: Pronounced "Sazan Aizu" in Japanese; "Sazan" is derived from the fact that there are three Sanjiyan Unkara with three eyes each, "sazan" being how "3 times 3" is pronounced when reciting the multiplication table in Japanese, and also from the transliteration of the English word "southern".) is a Japanese manga series written and illustrated by Yuzo Takada. It was serialized in Kodansha's seinen manga magazines Young Magazine Kaizokuban and Weekly Young Magazine from 1987 to 2002, spanning to a total of 40 volumes. The English language translation was published by Dark Horse Comics, but was discontinued after eight volumes in 2004.

Two original video animation (OVA) adaptations were released in 1991 and 1995. The first consists of four episodes averaging to half-hour of runtime and the second consists of three averaging out to 45 minutes of runtime. In the United States, the first OVA was distributed by Streamline Pictures and the second was partially distributed by Orion Home Video shortly after the Japanese releases. Both OVAs were released in their entirety by Manga Entertainment in the United Kingdom. The two OVAs were re-released in the United States by Pioneer Entertainment in 2001. There are also several 3×3 Eyes companion books, drama CDs, and video games, only released in Japan.

In 1993, 3×3 Eyes won the Kodansha Manga Award for the shōnen category.

== Plot ==
3×3 Eyes follows the adventures of Pai, the last remaining Sanjiyan Unkara (三只眼 吽迦羅; 'Three-eyed Mandala'), and her new Wu (Chinese reading of 无; an immortal companion), Yakumo, as they desperately try to find a magical artifact, the Ningen no Zō (ニンゲンの像; 'Statue of a Human'), to make Pai human so that she can forget her troubled past. Pai travelled to Tokyo searching for the artifact, but shortly after she arrived, a thief snatched her backpack and cane from her. A teenage lad, Yakumo, tackled the crook and managed to get the pack back for her, though the thief escaped with the cane. Yakumo took her to his work, where Pai was able to get cleaned up, and where she discovered that he was the son of Professor Fujii, an archaeologist she had met in Tibet four years prior. The Professor had been researching the legends of the Sanjiyans and had befriended her and offered to help her find the Ningen, only to fall ill and die. Pai had his last letter to his son in her backpack, which asked Yakumo to help Pai with her quest. Although he did not believe his father's tales of Pai being a monster, he agreed to assist her.

Their discussion was interrupted by news reports of a giant monster flying over the city. Pai recognised the creature as her pet Takuhi, who must have been released from his home in Pai's cane by the thief, and who was now looking for her. Pai set out to retrieve him, with Yakumo close behind. However, when Yakumo saw Takuhi fly towards Pai, the lad mistook the beast's welcome for an attack, and shoved Pai out the way; immediately Takuhi ripped into the lad, fatally wounding him. Unwilling to lose the boy she had been hunting for and just located, Pai's third eye opened, and she absorbed his soul. This restored his body, but tied him to her as her undead servant. Linked to her, he can only become human again when she becomes human. In the way of this goal are hordes of monsters and demons from the Shadow World, some desiring Pai's powers, others who seek the Ningen for their own. Yakumo can again become mortal and end his constant need to protect Pai because if Pai dies, then so will he. Along the way, they encounter many followers of the now-dead demon god Kaiyanwang, all of whom wish to kill Pai or siphon off her power in order to resurrect their deity and/or gain immortality.

== Media ==
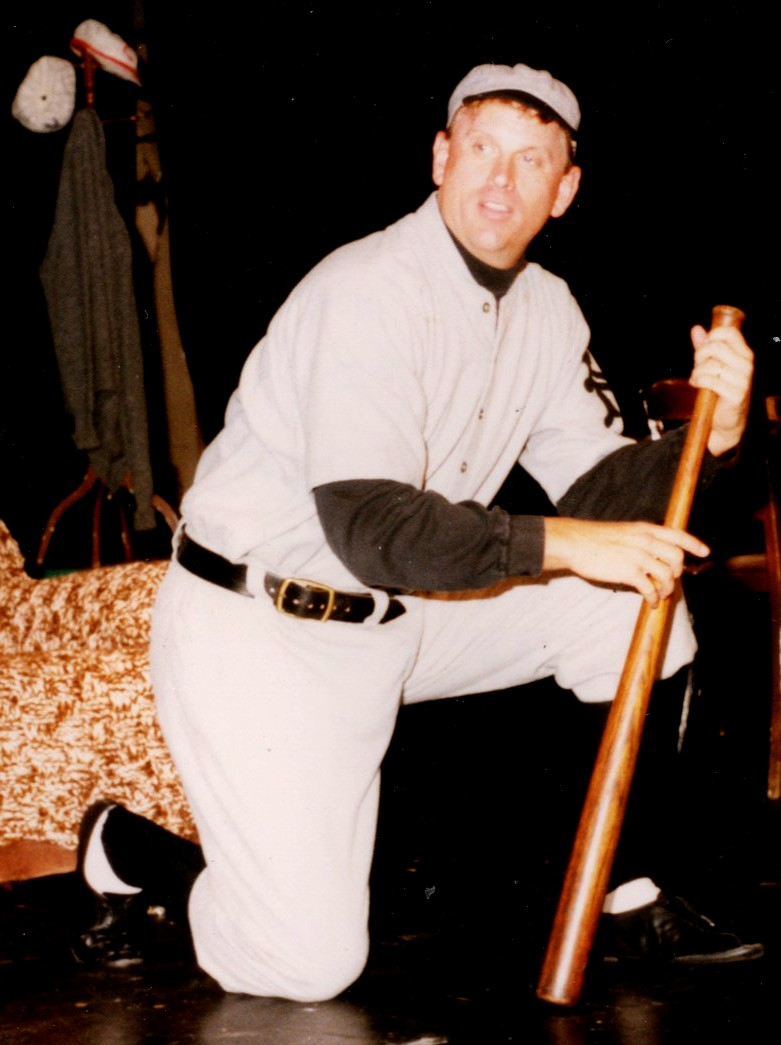
Eddie Frierson

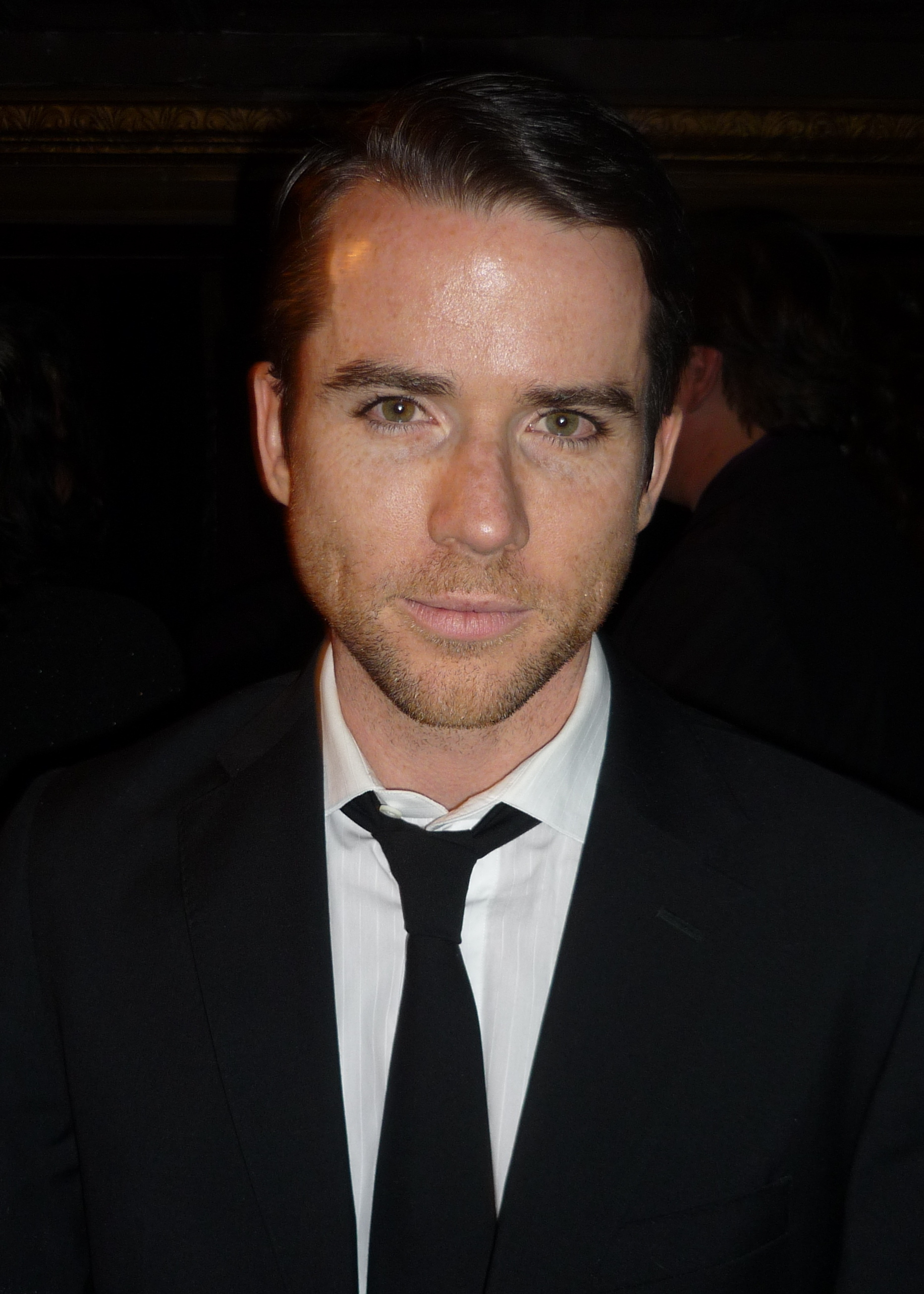
Christian Campbell

Yakumo was voiced by Frierson in the Streamline/Orion English dubs and Campbell in the Pioneer English dub.

=== Manga ===
Written and illustrated by Yuzo Takada, 3×3 Eyes was first published for five chapters in Kodansha's Young Magazine Kaizokuban from December 14, 1987, to April 10, 1989, and was later serialized in Weekly Young Magazine from 1989 to 2002. Kodansha collected its chapters in forty tankōbon volumes, released from October 17, 1988, to November 6, 2002. A limited edition of the final volume was released on the same day of the normal edition containing a video game for PC. Kodansha also released four special edition volumes. The first two were released on April 25, 2002. An additional box set was also released on the same day. The remaining two limited edition volumes were released on May 23, 2002. The manga was re-released into 24 volumes from August 12, 2009, to July 9, 2010. A limited edition of the final 24th volume was released on the same day as the normal edition containing a commemorative art book.

The English-language translation was originally published by Studio Proteus by Innovation Comics in 1991 (resulting in a five-issue miniseries), but in 1995 was published from the beginning by Dark Horse Comics after they purchased Studio Proteus, as well as serialized in Super Manga Blast! magazine. This release altered art to remove several instances of a "penis-like tentacle" emerging from a character's mouth in volume 2, this censorship was done with the approval of Yuzo Takada. A total of eight volumes were published between March 1, 1995, and May 5, 2004.

==== Sequels ====
A manga sequel, titled 3×3 Eyes: Genjū no Mori no Sōnansha (3×3EYES 幻獣の森の遭難者), began on Young Magazine Kaizokuban manga website (later renamed e Young Magazine in 2015) on December 26, 2014. The manga finished on August 12, 2016, and its chapters were collected in four volumes, released from June 27, 2015, to October 20, 2016.

A second manga sequel, titled 3×3 Eyes: Kiseki no Yami no Keiyakusha (3×3EYES 鬼籍の闇の契約者), started on December 22, 2016, on e Young Magazine online manga magazine. The manga was transferred to Monthly Young Magazine on February 20, 2019. The series finished on May 18, 2023. Kodansha collected its chapters in eight volumes, released from June 20, 2017, to September 20, 2023.

In May 2023, Takada announced that he was preparing a new story arc.

=== Original video animation ===
Two original video animations (OVAs) series were produced by Toei Animation and its subsidiary Studio Junio. The first, also entitled 3×3 Eyes, was released as four episodes between July 25, 1991, and May 19, 1992. Three of the episodes were directed by Daisuke Nishio and one was directed by Kazuhisa Takenōchi. The second, 3×3 Eyes: Legend of the Divine Demon (3×3 EYES 聖魔伝説, 3×3 Eyes: Seima Densetsu), was directed by Takenōchi and released as three episodes between July 25, 1995, to June 25, 1996. Both starred Megumi Hayashibara as Pai and Kōji Tsujitani as Yakumo. A four-disc Blu-ray box set, featuring the OVA episodes on the first two discs and the soundtrack on the other two, was released on August 4, 2010.

The first OVA was distributed in the United States by Streamline Pictures, which produced an English dub starring Eddie Frierson as Yakumo and Rebecca Forstadt as Pai. The episodes were first released individually on four VHS tapes from November 1, 1992, to June 6, 1993, and later combined by Orion Home Video on a single volume entitled 3×3 Perfect Collection, released on LaserDisc on August 24, 1994, and VHS on February 21, 1995. An English dub of the second OVA was produced by Pretend Productions, with Frierson and Forstadt reprising their roles, after Orion declined Streamline's plans to produce a release. Orion distributed the first two episodes of the second OVA on individual VHS tapes, but did not release the final episode due to its 1997 bankruptcy. The six episodes distributed by Streamline and Orion were briefly re-released by MGM until April 1999.

In the United Kingdom, Manga Entertainment distributed both OVAs on five VHS tapes from April 5, 1993, to October 14, 1996. Manga's release used the Streamline/Orion dub and included the final episode that was unreleased in the United States. The four episodes of the first OVA were combined into two parts on two VHS tapes and later a single VHS; the episodes of the second OVA were released individually as the third, fourth, and fifth parts.

The two OVAs were re-released in the United States by Pioneer/Geneon Entertainment with a new English dub produced by New Generation Pictures that starred Christian Campbell as Yakumo and Brigitte Bako as Pai. Directed by Greg Weisman, the dub also featured Keith David, Bill Fagerbakke, Thom Adcox-Hernandez, and Ed Asner, who appeared with Bako in Weisman's series Gargoyles. Pioneer/Geneon first released the episodes on two two-set VHS tapes and a two-disc DVD set in 2000 and later on two DVDs for each OVA in 2007. Since Geneon's 2007 bankruptcy, the OVAs have been out of print in the United States.

==== 3×3 Eyes ====
No.	Title	Original release date	Ref.
1	"Transmigration"; Transliteration: "Tensei no shō" (Japanese: 転生の章)	July 25, 1991	
2	"Yakumo"; Transliteration: "Yakumo no shō" (Japanese: 八雲の章)	September 26, 1991	
3	"Sacrifice"; Transliteration: "To-sei no shō" (Japanese: 採生の章)	January 23, 1992	
4	"Straying"; Transliteration: "Meisō no shō" (Japanese: 迷走の章)	March 19, 1992	

==== Legend of the Divine Demon ====
No.	Title	Original release date	Ref.
5	"Descent"; Transliteration: "Matsuei no shō" (Japanese: 末裔の章)	July 25, 1995	
6	"The Key"; Transliteration: "Kagi no shō" (Japanese: 鍵の章)	December 18, 1995	
7	"The Return"; Transliteration: "Kikan no shō" (Japanese: 帰還の章)	June 25, 1996	

=== Audio ===
Kaoru Wada - "Pai Longing" (1991)
Sample of Kaoru Wada's "Pai Longing" from 3×3 Eyes: Dai-ichi Shou (1991), the first soundtrack album of the anime series.

Three drama CDs have been released by King Records. The first, 3×3 Eyes Ten no Maki (3×3EYES 天之巻, 3×3 Eyes Heaven Volume), was released on September 5, 1990. The second, 3×3 Eyes Hito no Maki (3×3EYES 人之巻, 3×3 Eyes Mankind Volume), was released on November 21, 1990. The third, 3×3 Eyes Chi no Maki (3×3EYES 地之巻, 3×3 Eyes Earth Volume), was released on June 23, 1993.

Music for both anime OVA series were composed by Kaoru Wada and primarily performed by a group known as Takada Band. All soundtracks were released under its Star Child label. For the original OVA, a total of four soundtracks were released. The soundtrack titled, 3×3 Eyes: Dai-ichi Shou (3×3EYES 第壱章, 3×3 Eyes Chapter 1) was released on August 21, 1991. The second soundtrack titled, 3×3 Eyes: Dai-ni Shou (3×3 EYES第弐章, 3×3 Eyes Chapter 2) was released on November 21, 1991. The third soundtrack titled, 3×3 Eyes: Dai-san Shou (3×3EYES 第参章, 3×3 Eyes Chapter 3) was released on April 22, 1992. The fourth soundtrack titled 3×3 Eyes TAKADA BAND was released on June 24, 1992, and contains tracks primarily performed by Takada Band.

For the second OVA, 3×3 Eyes: Legend of the Divine Demon, two soundtracks have been released. The first soundtrack titled, 3×3 Eyes: Legend of the Divine Demon - Descendant Musical Terminal (3×3 EYES 聖魔伝説 末裔譜譚詩, 3×3 Eyes: Seima Densetsu - Matsuei Fudanshi) was released on July 5, 1995. The second soundtrack titled, 3×3 Eyes: Legend of the Divine Demon - Descendant Musical Terminal II (3×3 EYES 聖魔伝説 末裔譜譚詩II, 3×3 Eyes: Seima Densetsu - Matsuei Fudanshi Tsu) was released on June 5, 1996.

Kaoru Wada's theme song "Pai Longing" appears on 3×3 Eyes: Dai-ichi Shou (1991). Several reviewers have noted its resemblance to James Horner's theme song to the later 1995 Hollywood film Braveheart.

=== Video games ===
Various video games came out based on the 3×3 Eyes manga and OVA. Two video games were developed for the Super Famicom. The first titled, 3×3 Eyes Seima kōrin-den (3×3EYES 聖魔降臨伝) was developed by Yutaka and released on July 28, 1992. The second titled, 3×3 Eyes Jūma hōkan (3×3EYES 獣魔奉還) was developed by Banpresto and released on December 22, 1995. A video game for the Sega Mega-CD titled, Seima Densetsu 3×3 Eyes MCD (聖魔伝説3×3EYES MCD) was developed by Sega and released on July 23, 1993.

Nihon Create had developed three games for the 3×3 Eyes and ported to several consoles. The first video game developed by Nihon Create titled, 3×3 Eyes Sanjiyan Henjō (3×3 EYES 三只眼變成) was released on PC-9801, FM Towns, PC-Engine, Windows 3.1, and Windows 95. The second video game developed by Nihon Create titled 3×3 Eyes: Kyūsei Kōshu (3×3 EYES 吸精公主) was released on Windows 95, PlayStation, and then a Sega Saturn port titled, 3×3 Eyes: Kyūsei Kōshu S (3×3 EYES 吸精公主 S). The third video game developed by Nihon Create titled 3×3 Eyes Tenrin' ō Genmu (3×3 EYES 転輪王幻夢) was released on Windows 95, Windows 98, Windows 2000, Windows XP and PlayStation. The three games were collected in a 4-disc DVD box set titled 3×3 Eyes Memorial on December 13, 2002.

=== Other ===
Several companion books have been released for 3×3 Eyes manga. The first is titled 3×3 Eyes: Yōma daizukan (3×3 EYES 妖魔大図鑑, 3×3 Eyes Monster Encyclopedia) and released on April 24, 1998. The book features character and monster encyclopedia, commentary, crossword, stickers, and a short story titled Hyōhaku suru Yōma (漂泊する妖魔, Wandering Monster) by Endo Akinori. A second book titled 3×3 Eyes Another World was released on April 1, 2001. It contains a special talk with Endo Akinori and interviews with the characters Pai and Yakumo. An anthology book titled 3×3 Eyes Another Story was released on March 23, 2000, and contains short stories written by Endo Akinori, Katsumi Ishizuka, and Kusano Shinichi. A papercraft book titled 3×3 Eyes: Yōma rittai zukan (3×3 EYES 妖魔立体図鑑, 3×3 Eyes Monster 3D picture book) was released on May 24, 2000. A book titled 3×3 Eyes: Perfect Jiten (3×3 EYES パーフェクト事典, 3×3 Perfect Encyclopedia) was released on April 6, 2001.

The German digital hardcore group Atari Teenage Riot used audio samples from the Streamline English dub of the first episode of 3×3 Eyes in their song "Start the Riot", released on the compilation album Burn, Berlin, Burn! in 1997 (song released in 1995). Alec Empire of Atari Teenage Riot also used samples from the first and second episodes of the Streamline dub on his 1996 solo album The Destroyer.

== Reception ==
As of February 2015, 3×3 Eyes had over 33 million copies in circulation. In 1993, the manga won the Kodansha Manga Award for shōnen.

The OVA adaptation had received mixed reviews. Theron Martin of Anime News Network praised both OVAs stating "While not a spectacular series, 3×3 Eyes is nonetheless a very solid production which should entertain those who don't mind high levels of bloodshed and rampant mystical content." Justin Sevakis also of Anime News Network, criticized the artstyle the animation quality of the series, whilst noting that the series is still entertaining. Carlos Ross of THEM Anime Reviews praised the first OVA for its animation and characters, but criticized the story for its "disjunctive nature" and "anticlimactic" ending. For the second OVA, Ross gave the plot a mix review noting that it is more coherent than the previous OVA, but also more confusing. Stig Høgset also of THEM Anime Reviews, gave both the OVAs a more positive review, praising the characters and artwork, but criticizing the ending for it feeling unfinished. Luis Cruz from Mania gave the first OVA a mixed review, stating, "3×3 Eyes has the material to be a classic series [sic] However, the OVA format limits its potential by constraining the amount of time it can spend building the characters and their world." He continued to state for the second OVA, "It only falls short by being hobbled with a story arc conclusion rather than a proper ending" and "the story stands well enough on its own and provides nearly two hours of action, humor, and intriguing mysteries".
