= 1860s =

Decade

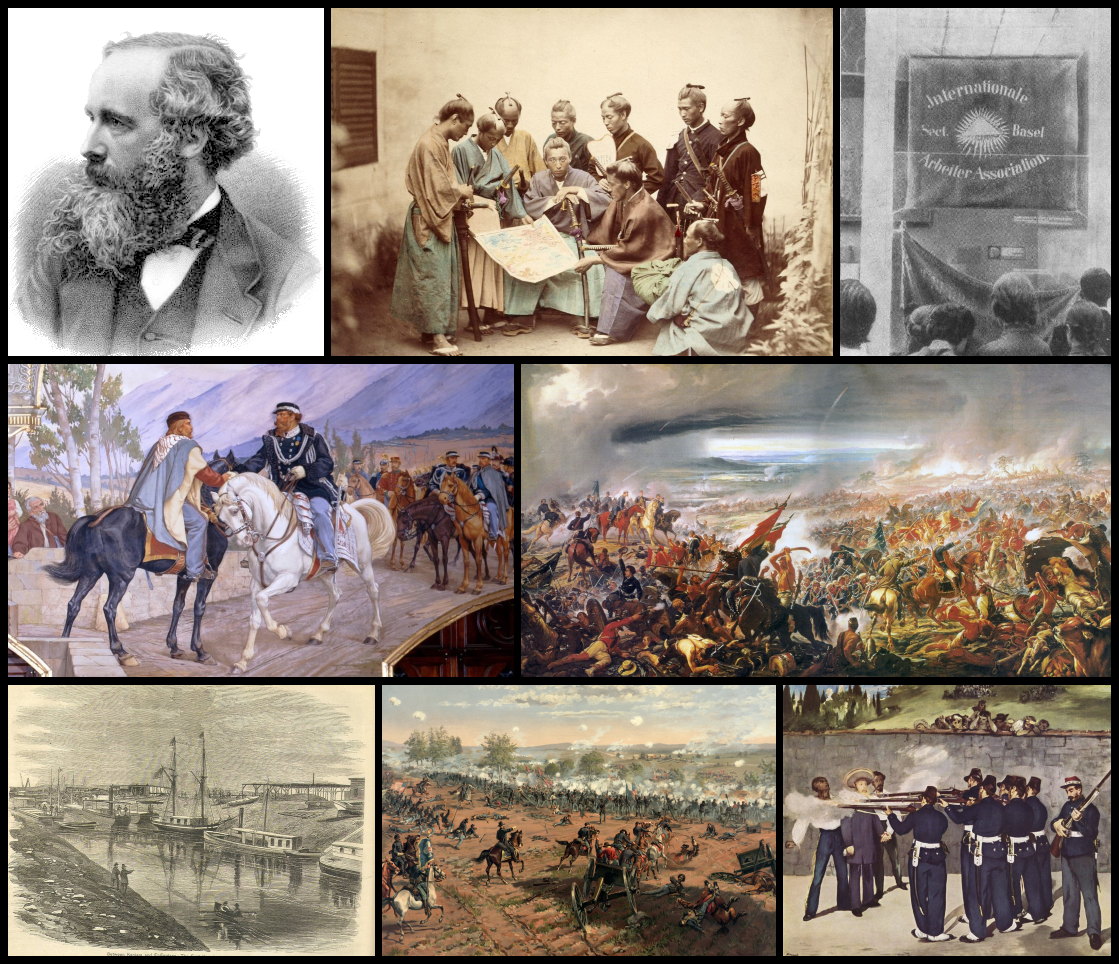
From top left, clockwise: Scottish physicist James Clerk Maxwell formulates the classical theory of electromagnetic radiation, bringing together for the first time electricity, magnetism, and light as different manifestations of the same phenomenon; the Meiji Restoration leads to enormous changes in Japan's political and social structure; the International Workingmen's Association is formed in 1864, aimed at uniting a variety of different left-wing socialist, communist and anarchist groups; the Battle of Avay, fought in 1868 during the Paraguayan War, the bloodiest inter-state war in Latin America's history; execution in 1867 of Maximilian I of Mexico, ruler of the Second Mexican Empire, established during the Second French intervention in Mexico; the Battle of Gettysburg, the turning point of the American Civil War, fought in the United States from 1861 to 1865, between the North (the Union) and the South (the Confederacy) as a result of the long-standing controversy over the enslavement of black people; the Suez Canal is inaugurated in 1869; Victor Emmanuel II meets Garibaldi near Teano in 1860, at the end of the Expedition of the Thousand.

The 1860s (pronounced "eighteen-sixties") was a decade of the Gregorian calendar that began on January 1, 1860 and ended on December 31, 1869.

The decade was noted for featuring numerous major societal shifts in the Americas. In North America, the election of anti-slavery candidate Abraham Lincoln to the presidency in 1860 in the United States led to the secession of eleven southern states as the Confederate States of America (CSA). The resulting American Civil War (1861–1865) would be among the first industrial wars, featuring advanced technology such as steel warships and machine guns. The victory of the Union and subsequent abolition of slavery would contribute to the decline of the global slave trade. Conflict in Mexico ensued after the French Empire installed Maximilian I as Emperor of Mexico; former President Benito Suarez would regain his position in 1867 after a power struggle.

In South America, the Triple Alliance of the Empire of Brazil, Argentina and Uruguay in the Paraguayan War (1864–1870) would be among the bloodiest conflicts in the continent's history, leading to the death of almost 60% of the Paraguayan population.

In Europe, the formation of the union of Austria-Hungary in 1867 and the ongoing campaign to unify Italy by Victor Emmanuel II of Sardinia-Piedmont would affect the European balance of power. The United Kingdom would continue engaging in a series of conflicts known as the New Zealand Wars with the indigenous Māori, with the New Zealand land confiscations beginning in 1863.

In Asia, the Meiji Restoration of 1868 would begin the process of transforming Japan into a global imperial power. The Qing Dynasty of China would experience decline following its defeat to the British in 1860 in the Second Opium War. In 1864, the Russian Empire would embark upon the Circassian genocide in the Caucasus, leading to the deaths or expulsion of at least 75% of the Circassian people.

The last living person from this decade was Nellie Spencer, who died on November 13, 1982.

== Politics and wars ==
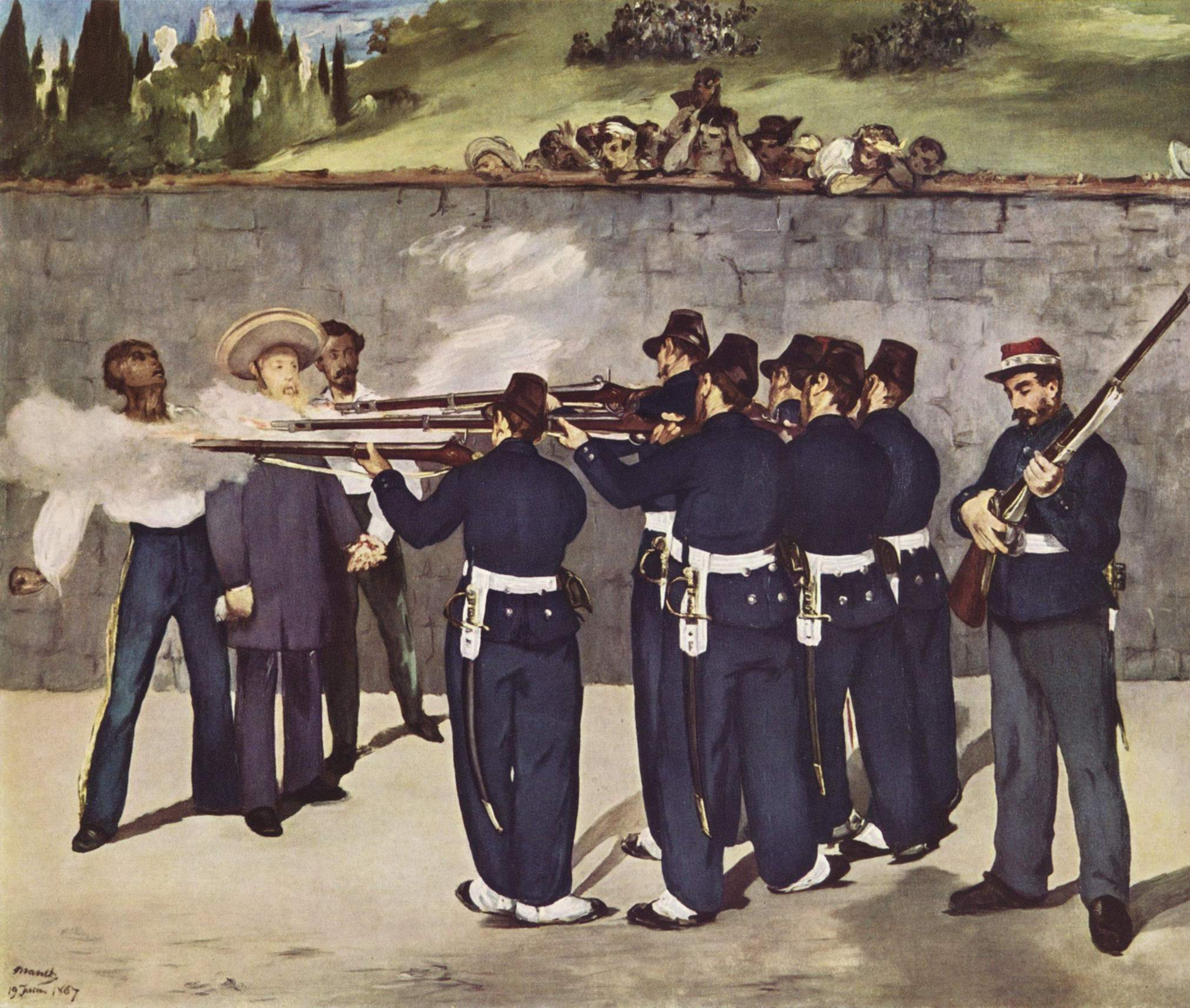
Emperor Maximilian being executed (1867), marking the end of the Second Mexican Empire

=== Wars ===
- French occupation of Mexico (1863–1867). Replacement of President of Mexico Benito Juárez (1861–1863) at first with Juan Nepomuceno Almonte (1863–1864) and then by Emperor Maximilian of Mexico (1864–1867) with the establishment of the Second Mexican Empire. Juárez eventually manages to recover his position (1867–1872).
- On 18 October 1860, the first Convention of Peking formally ended the Second Opium War.
- The American Civil War which lasted from 1861 to 1865.
- The Paraguayan War (1864–1870) starts in South America, with the invasion of Paraguay by the Triple Alliance (Empire of Brazil, Argentina and Uruguay). It will kill almost 60% of the country's population.
- The main phase of the New Zealand Wars between British colonials and the Māori population begins with the First Taranaki War in 1860. The most significant campaign is the Invasion of the Waikato in 1863, which sees some 14,000 British and colonial troops engaged.
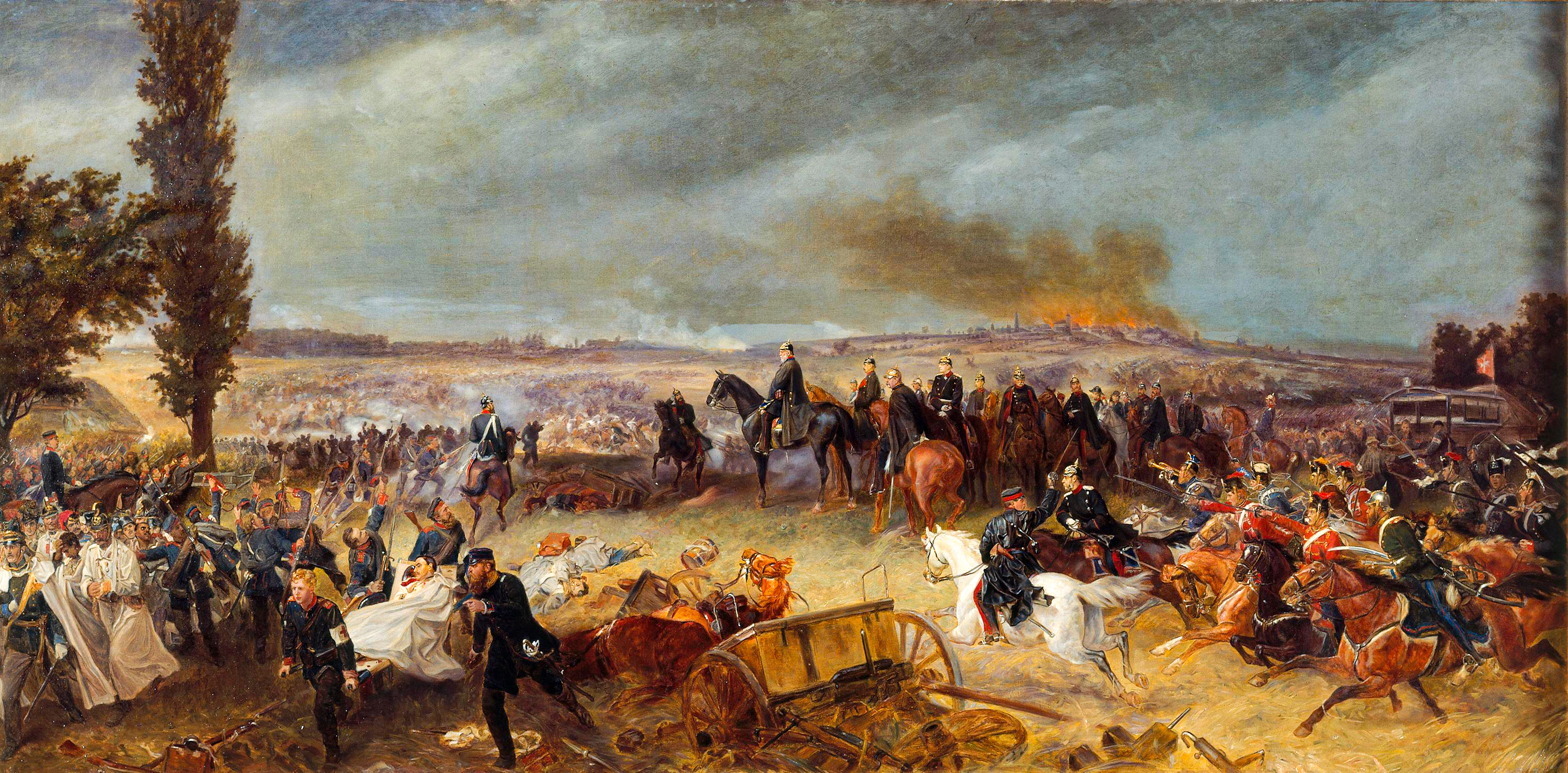
  The Battle of Königgrätz was the decisive battle of the Austro-Prussian War
- The Kingdom of Prussia under Bismarck invaded Denmark in 1864, which ended in the division of Schleswig, the location of a pro-German revolt, between Prussia and the Austrian Empire. Though Prussia and Austria had both fought side by side in this war, Prussia later attacked Austria in the Austro-Prussian war of 1866. The technological and logistical superiority of Prussia's armed forces obliterated Austria and its allies, the former also having to deal with Prussia's ally Italy in Venice. By the end of these conflicts, Prussia was seen as the most powerful state in Germany, and had total hegemony over the other German states. The NGF was formed after the Austro-Prussian war, uniting the states of north Germany, and Prussia soon led it into another conflict with France.
- The Bhutan War between the British Empire and Bhutan lasted from 1864 to 1865. It ended in a British victory and the loss of some Bhutanese territory to British India.
- The British Expedition to Abyssinia was a rescue mission and punitive expedition carried out in 1868 by the armed forces of the British Empire against the Ethiopian Empire.
- Conclusion of the Russo-Circassian War (1763–1864) resulting in Russian victory and subsequent Circassian genocide and diaspora.

=== Internal conflicts ===
American Civil War: Battle of Antietam by Thure de Thulstrup

- The Federal War was a civil war (1859–1863) in Venezuela between the Conservative party and the Liberal party over the monopoly the Conservatives held over government positions and land ownership, and their intransigence to granting any reforms. It was the biggest and bloodiest civil war that Venezuela had since its independence. Hundreds of thousands died in the violence of the war, or from hunger or disease, in a country with a population of just over a million people
- American Civil War fought between the remaining United States of America under President Abraham Lincoln and the self-declared Confederate States of America under President Jefferson Davis (April 12, 1861 – April 9, 1865) and Vice President Alexander Stephens.
  - Beginning of the Reconstruction era under President Andrew Johnson (1865–1869).
- 1863–64 January Uprising in the Russian Empire.
- On 19 July 1864 the fall of Nanjing formally ended the 14-year Taiping Rebellion.
- 1862–1877 Tongzhi Hui Revolt in Qing dynasty of China.
- 1868–1869 Boshin War in Japan, fought between the Tokugawa shogunate and those seeking to return political power to the Imperial Court.

=== Prominent political events ===
- Italian Unification under King Victor Emmanuel II. Wars for expansion and national unity continue until the incorporation of the Papal States (March 17, 1861 – September 20, 1870).
- Abolition of serfdom in Russia by tsar Alexander II (1861).
- Meiji Restoration in Japan (1866–1869). Tokugawa Yoshinobu, 15th and last of the Tokugawa shōguns loses control to the Meiji Emperor. A series of reforms follows. The samurai class fails to survive while the daimyōs turn to politics.
- The Dominion of Canada is created by the British North America Act on July 1, 1867.
- Compromise between Austria and Hungary, hence creating the Austro-Hungarian Empire in 1867.
- The "La Gloriosa"revolution in Spain (1868). Queen Isabella II is deposed.

== Assassinations and attempts ==
Prominent assassinations, targeted killings, and assassination attempts include:

Year	Date	Name	Position	Culprits	Country	Description	Image
1860	March 24	Ii Naosuke	Tairō of the Tokugawa Shogunate	17 young samurai loyalists	Japan	While Naosuke was at staying at the Edo Castle a group of 17 loyalist ambushed and was decapitated.	
1861	October 23	Jorge Córdova	president of Bolivia	Colonel Plácido Yáñez	Bolivia	Jorge was captured by Colonel Plácido Yáñez and executed along with 50 other prisoners.	
1862	January 11	José Santos Guardiola	President of Honduras	unknown presidential guard	Honduras	Jose was sleeping with his wife Ana Arbizú y Flores when an unknown assassin shot him and fled.	
1863	May 12	Radama II	King of Madagascar	Men led by Rainivoninahitriniony	Madagascar	Radama's absolutism in pursuing dramatic reforms in disregard of the advice of his ministers ultimately turned them against him. In a coup led by his prime minister, Rainivoninahitriniony, Radama II was strangled on May 12, 1863.	
1863	October 30	Serizawa Kamo	chief of Shinsen-gumi	likely Hijikata, Okita, Yamanami Keisuke, Inoue, Harada or Tōdō and Saitō	Japan	While sleeping with a woman named Oume he was assassinated by an unknown assassin.	
1865	March 27	Manuel Isidoro Belzu Humérez	President of Bolivia	A group of men led by Mariano Melgarejo	Bolivia	When Belzu entered the Palacio Quemado for a meeting with Mariano Melgarejo he was ambushed by Melgarejo and a group of men who murdered him.	
1865	April 14	Abraham Lincoln	President of America	John Wilkes Booth	United States of America	On the night of April 14 of 1865, John Wilkes Booth sneaked into Ford's Theatre and assassinated the President whilst he watched Our America Cousin.	Image of Lincoln being shot by Booth while sitting in a theater booth.
1868	February 19	Venancio Flores and Bernardo Prudencio Berro	President of Uruguay	Group of unknown assassins	Uruguay	Four days after stepping down as President, Flores and Berro were murdered by a group of unidentified assassins in Montevideo.	
1868	April 7	Thomas D'Arcy McGee	Member of the Canadian Parliament for Montreal West	Patrick J. Whelan	Canada	McGee was entering a boarding house in Ottawa when he was shot in the head by a Catholic Fenian sympathizer.	
1868	October 22	James M. Hinds	Member of the U.S. House of Representatives from Arkansas's 2nd district	George Clark	United States	En route to a campaign event for Grant near the village of Indian Bay in Monroe County, Clark shot Hinds and fellow Republican politician Joseph Brooks in the back with a shotgun. Brooks managed to stay on his horse and ride to the event to bring back assistance, before his death Hinds wrote a message to his wife revealing the killers identity as secretary of the Monroe County Democratic Party and local Klansman, George Clark.	
1868	December 10	Sakamoto Ryōma and Nakaoka Shintarō	Japanese samurai and influential figure of the Bakumatsu	unknown assassin	Tokugawa Shogunate	Ryōma and Shintarō where eating in the Ōmiya Inn when an unknown broke in and killed the men and the bodyguards.	
1869	December 7	Ōmura Masujirō	military leader and theorist	unknown assassin	Japan	Omura was stabbed in a Kyoto inn and died in Osaka.	

== Disasters and natural events ==
- 1860 to 1861 – Upper Doab famine of 1860–1861
- 1860 to 1861 – the Black Winter of 1860-1861 in Qajar Iran
- 1862 – the Great Flood of 1862, the largest flood in the recorded history of California, Oregon, and Nevada, inundated the western United States and portions of British Columbia and Mexico
- 1865 flooding of Bucharest, Romania, the result of snowmelt
- April 27, 1865 - The Steamboat Sultana explodes due to overcrowding putting pressure on a patched boiler which makes it explode and instantly sink, killing up to 1800 people in the worst maritime disaster in US History.
- May 12, 1866 – the 1866 Bingöl earthquake struck the Ottoman Empire, associated with faulting along the East Anatolian Fault
- 1866 to 1868 – famine in French Algeria, 820,000 died
- December 18, 1867 – the 1867 Keelung earthquake and tsunami, affected the northern coast of Taiwan
- 1867 to 1869 – the Swedish famine of 1867–1869
- October 4–5, 1869 – the 1869 Saxby Gale, a Category 2 hurricane struck Canada's Bay of Fundy region

== Science and technology ==
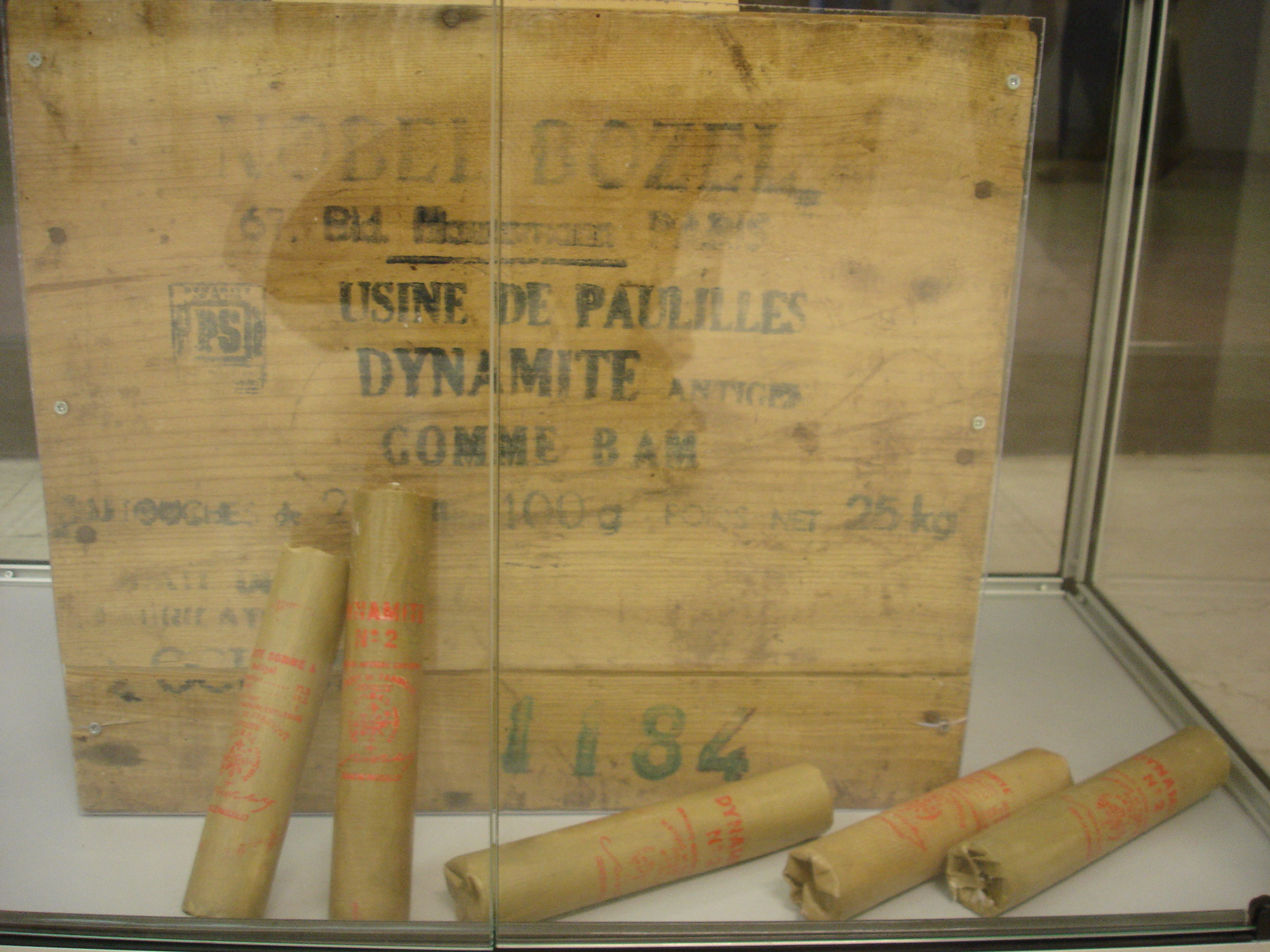
Alfred Nobel invents dynamite in Sweden, patenting it in 1867

- The Metropolitan Railway, the world's first underground railway, opens in London in 1863.
- The Plongeur, the first mechanically powered submarine in the world, is launched in 1863 after three years of construction.
- The United States’ first transcontinental railroad is completed in 1869.
- The Suez Canal in Egypt is opened in 1869.
- Carl Wilhelm Borchardt discovers and proves Cayley's formula in graph theory in 1860.
- The first transatlantic telegraph cable is successfully laid in 1866, enabling almost instant communication between America and Europe.
- Alfred Nobel invents dynamite in Sweden, patenting it in 1867.
- James Clerk Maxwell publishes his equations that quantify the relationship between electricity and magnetism, and shows that light is a form of electromagnetic radiation
- Joseph Lister develops antiseptic methods for use in surgery in 1867, introducing carbolic acid as an antiseptic, turning it into the first widely used surgical antiseptic in surgery, and publishing Antiseptic Principle of the Practice of Surgery. As a result, deaths from infections due to surgery greatly decrease.
- Gregor Mendel formulates Mendel's laws of inheritance, the basis for genetics, in a two-part paper written in 1865 and published in 1866, although it is largely ignored until 1900.
- Dmitri Mendeleev develops the modern periodic table
- Helium was first detected during the total solar eclipse of August 18, 1868, in parts of India. It was the first eclipse expedition in which a spectroscope was used.
- J. Norman Lockyer and Pierre Janssen are honored for their discovery of the nature of the Sun's prominences. They were the first to notice bright spectral emission lines when viewing the limb of the Sun without the aid of a total solar eclipse.
- 1862 International Exhibition in London, England and 1867 International Exposition in Paris.
- Louis Pasteur develops a technique of food preservation known as Pasteurization, advancing understanding of the Germ theory of disease.

== Establishments ==
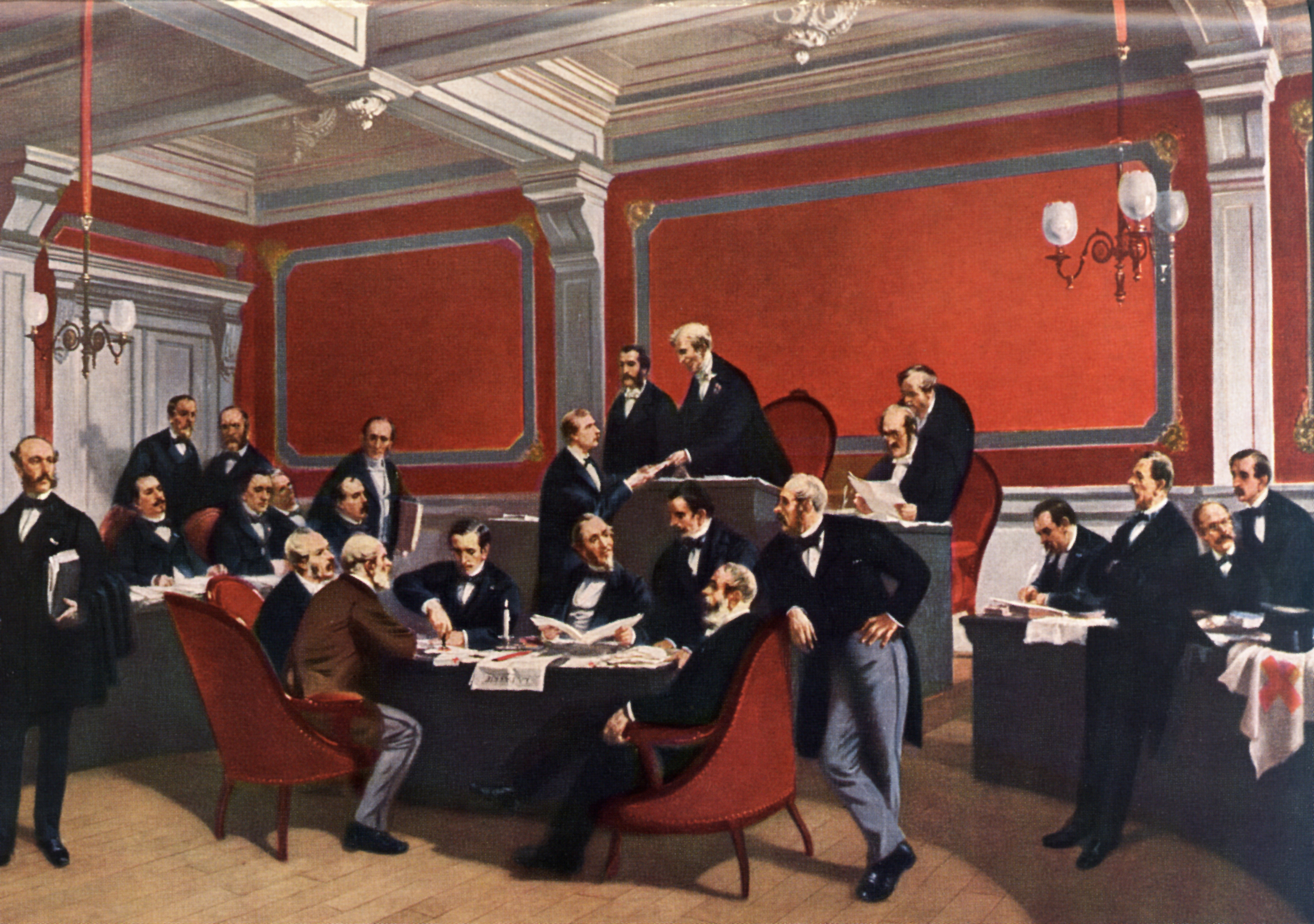
The signing of the First Geneva Convention by some of the major European powers in 1864

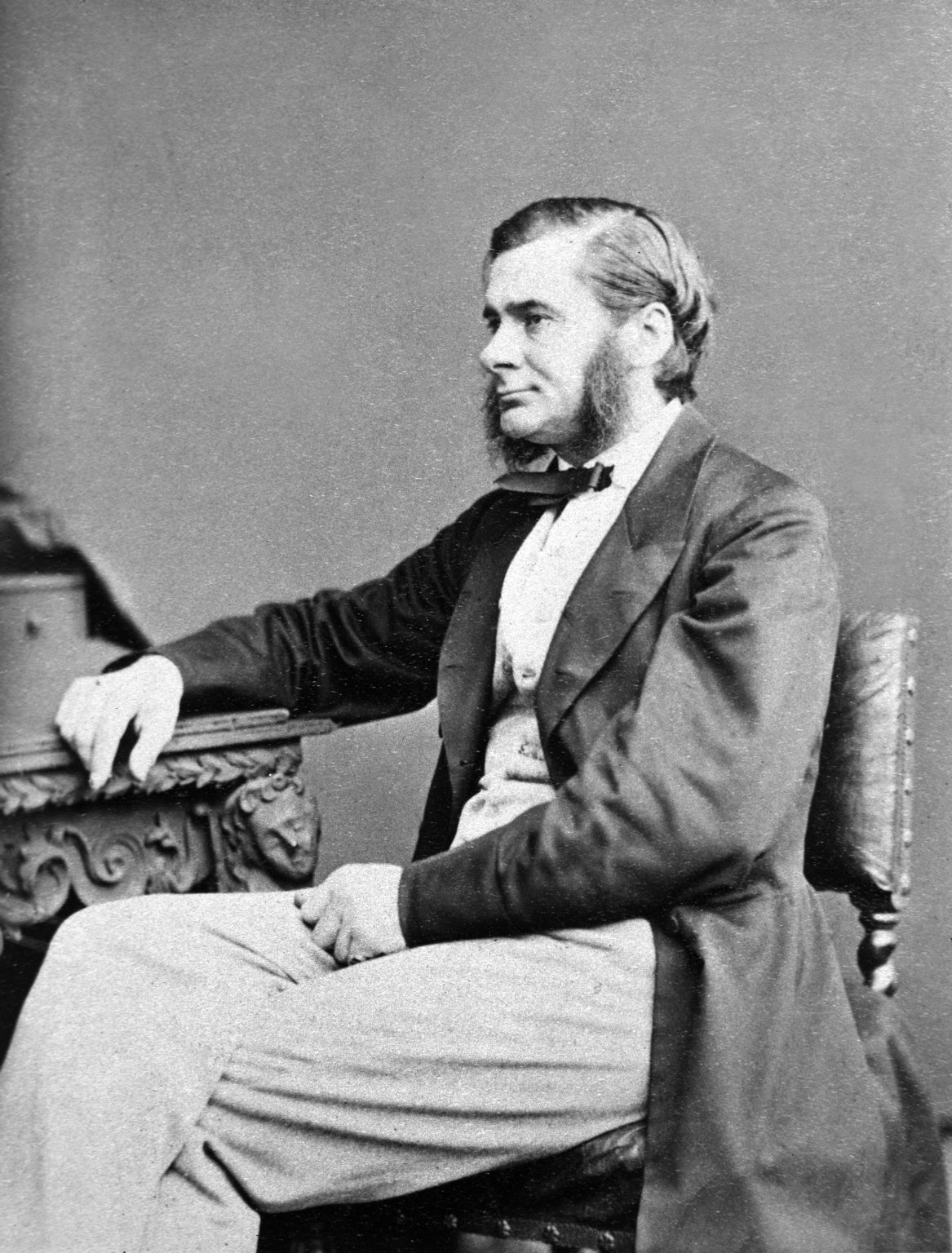
T. H. Huxley's famous debate in 1860 with Samuel Wilberforce was a key moment in the wider acceptance of Charles Darwin's theory of evolution

- The London Fire Brigade was established in 1865.
- Florence Nightingale founds school for nurses in 1860.
- Purdue University in West Lafayette, Indiana, USA opens its doors on May 6, 1869, for the first time under a land grant from the Morrill Act.

== Religion ==
- Within Catholicism, reaction against higher criticism and the liberal movement in Europe
- The Seventh-day Adventist Church becomes officially established in 1863 in Battle Creek, Michigan.
- The Christian Mission, later renamed the Salvation Army, is co-founded by William and Catherine Booth in London in 1865.
- Bahá'u'lláh declares his station as "the One whom God shall make Manifest", in the Garden of Ridván. Baháʼís see this as the beginning date of the Baháʼí Faith.

== Culture ==
=== Literature and arts ===
- Victor Hugo publishes Les Misérables.
- Leo Tolstoy publishes War and Peace.
- Fyodor Dostoevsky publishes Crime and Punishment.
- Lewis Carroll publishes Alice's Adventures in Wonderland.
- Jules Verne publishes Twenty Thousand Leagues Under the Seas.
- Impressionism went public.
- Charles Dickens publishes Great Expectations and Our Mutual Friend.
- George Eliot publishes the Silas Marner.
- Karl Marx publishes Das Kapital.
- Horatio Alger publishes Ragged Dick.
- Winged Victory of Samothrace is discovered, 1863.

=== Sports ===
- The first college football game is played in 1869, with Rutgers beating Princeton 6–4.
- The sport of skiing is invented around 1862.
- The Football Association is formed in the United Kingdom of Great Britain and Ireland, paving the way for association football to become the world's predominant spectator sport.
- The Cincinnati Redstockings became the first openly professional baseball team in 1869. They finished the same season with a perfect 58–0 record, thanks in large part to their Hall of Fame leader Harry Wright.

=== Fashion ===
- The Victorian era and its culture largely thrived from 1860 until 1901.
- The culture of the Victorian era comes to America and remains in place until around the turn of the 20th century, where the year it ends is disputed as to whether it ended with the rise of progressivism in 1896 or with the death of Queen Victoria in 1901.

=== Miscellaneous trends ===
- The start of the bicycle craze of 1860–1900

== People ==
=== Politics ===
- Louis Curchod, Director International Telecommunication Union

=== Famous and infamous personalities ===
- John Wilkes Booth, the assassin of president Abraham Lincoln
- Kit Carson, Wild West, frontiersman, mountain man
- Thomas C. Durant, Wild West, railroad tycoon
- Wild Bill Hickok, Wild West, lawman.

== Births ==
1860

=== January–March ===
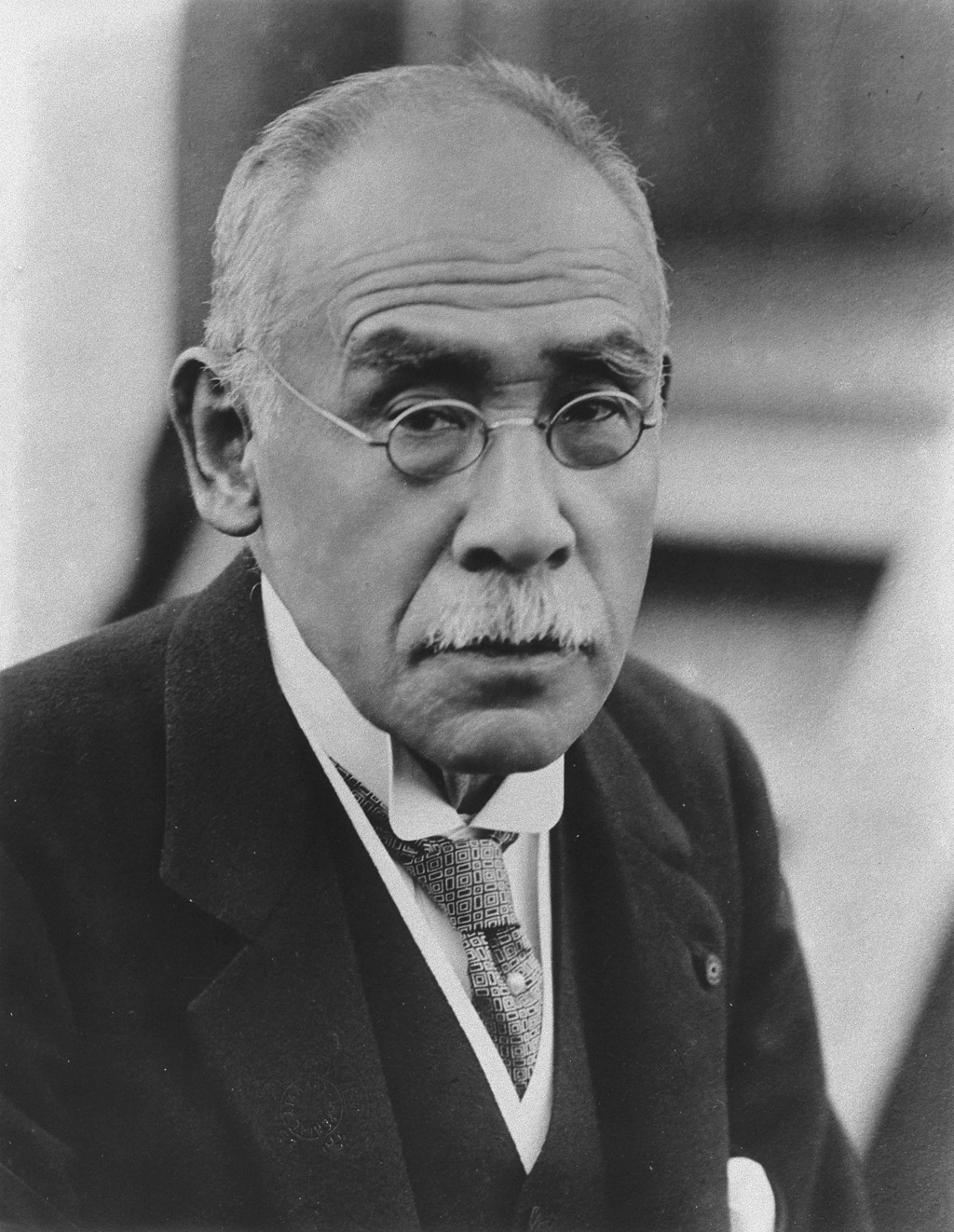
Takaaki Kato

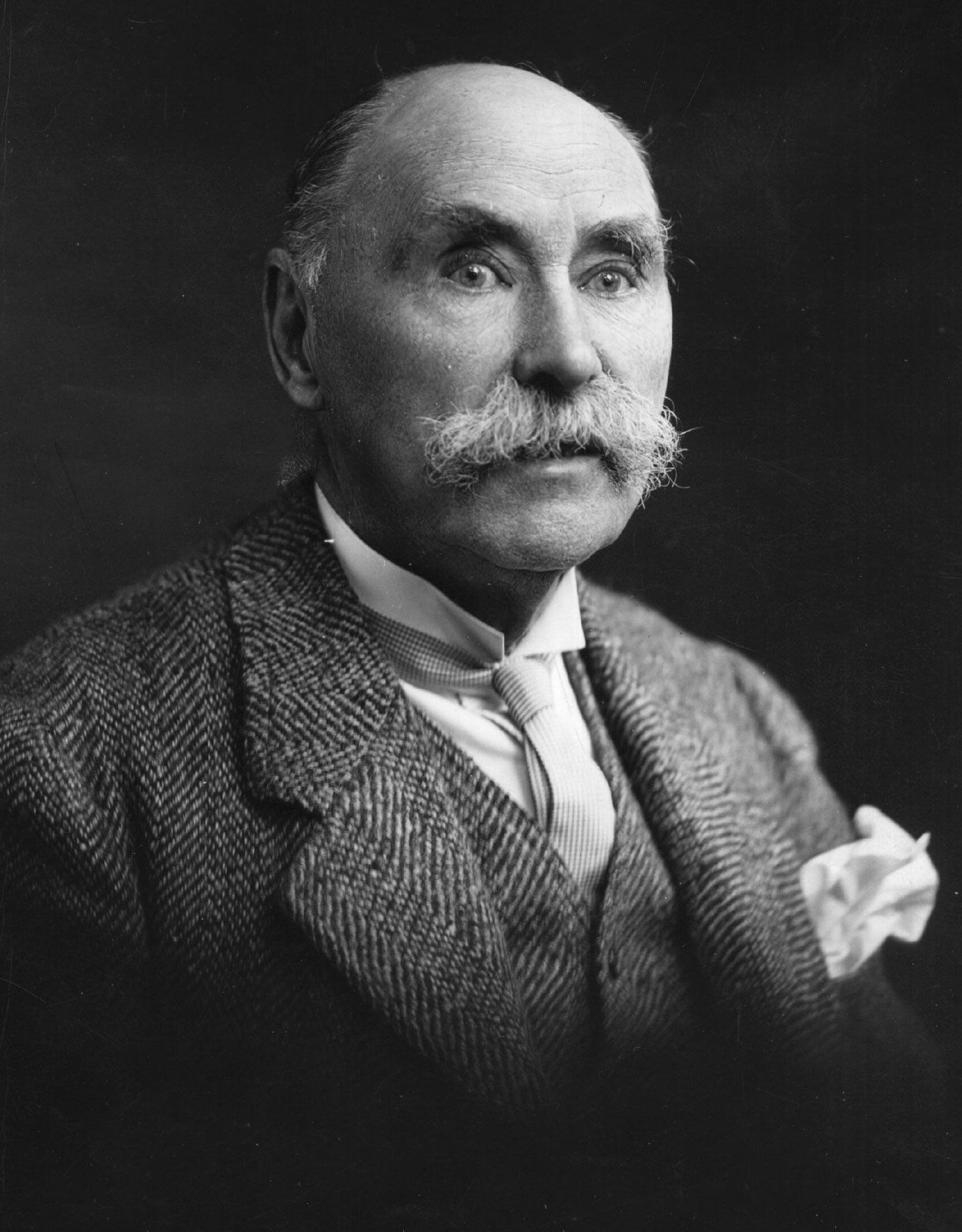
Douglas Hyde

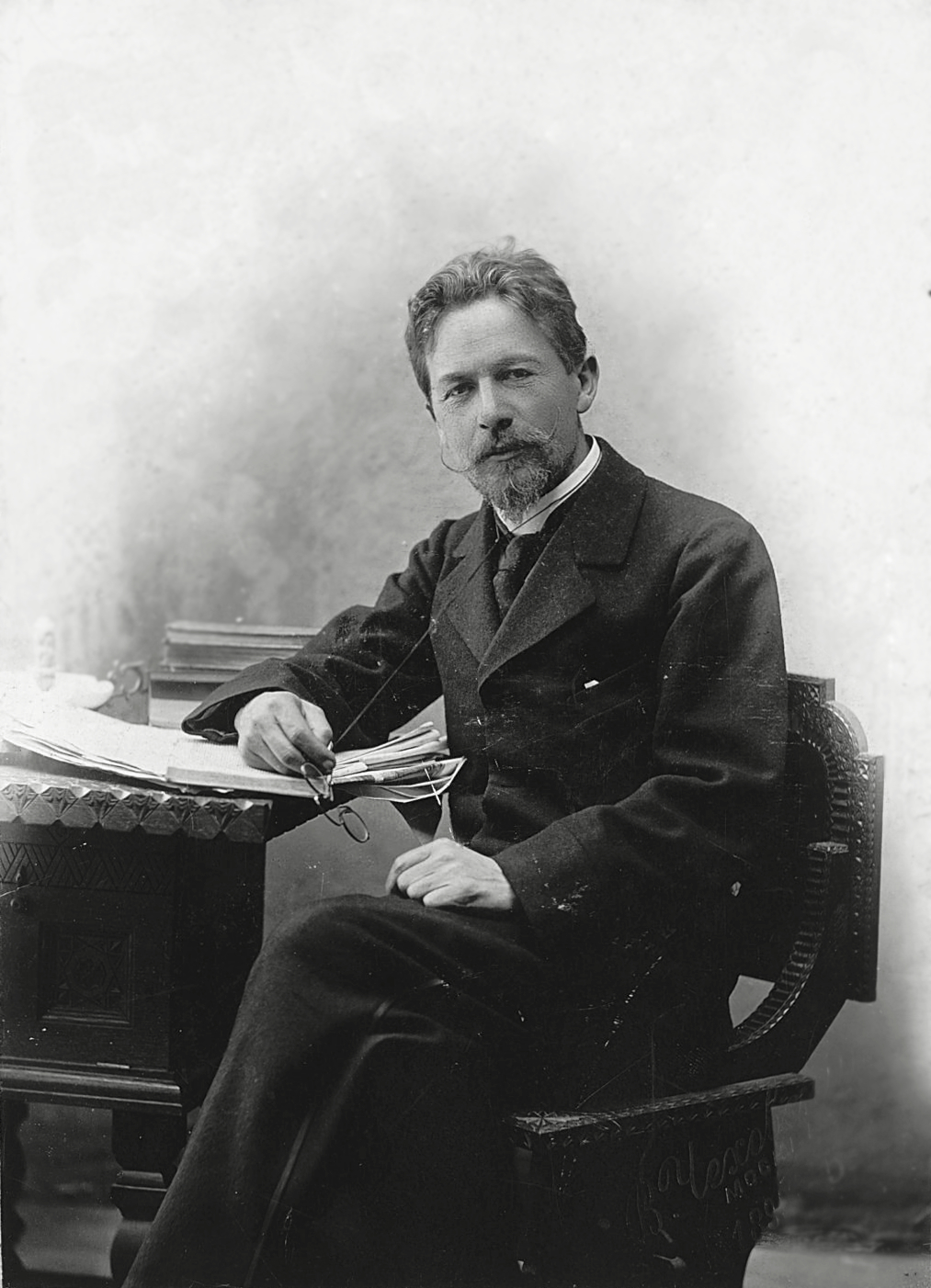
Anton Chekhov

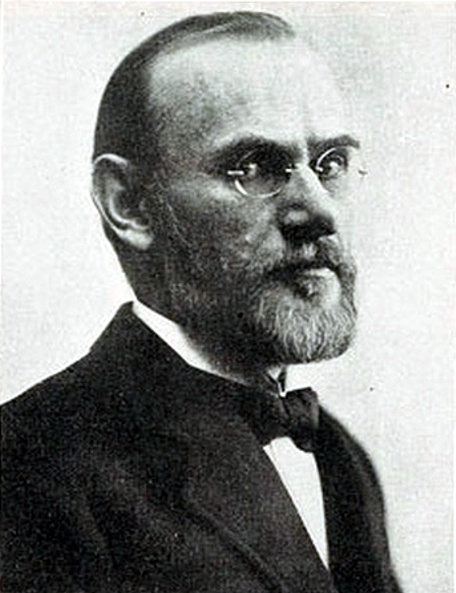
Carl Georg Barth

- January 3
  - Kato Takaaki, 24th Prime Minister of Japan (d. 1926)
  - Yashiro Rokurō, Japanese admiral and politician (d. 1930)
- January 8 – Emma Booth, fourth child of William and Catherine Booth (d. 1903)
- January 17 – Douglas Hyde, 1st President of Ireland (d. 1949)
- January 21 – Karl Staaff, Swedish lawyer, politician, 11th Prime Minister of Sweden (d. 1915)
- January 25 – Charles Curtis, American politician, 31st Vice President (d. 1936)
- January 28 – W. G. Read Mullan, American Jesuit, academic (d. 1910)
- January 29
  - William Jacob Baer, American painter (d. 1941)
  - Anton Chekhov, Russian writer (d. 1904)
- February 11 – Rachilde, French author (d. 1953)
- February 14 – Eugen Schiffer, German politician (d. 1954)
- February 18 – Anders Zorn, Swedish artist (d. 1920)
- February 25 – Sir William Ashley, English economic historian (d. 1927)
- February 28 – Carl Georg Barth, Norwegian-American mathematician, mechanical engineer (d. 1939)
- February 29 – Herman Hollerith, American businessman, inventor (d. 1929)
- March 2 – Susanna M. Salter, first woman mayor in the United States (d. 1961)
- March 5 – Sam Thompson, American baseball player (d. 1922)
- March 13 – Hugo Wolf, Austrian composer (d. 1903)
- March 19 – William Jennings Bryan, American politician (d. 1925)
- March 23 – Horatio Bottomley, British politician and businessman (d. 1933)

=== April–June ===
- April 2 – Zheng Xiaoxu, Chinese statesman, diplomat and calligrapher, first Prime Minister of Manchukuo (d. 1938)
- April 7 – Will Keith Kellogg, American industrialist, founder of the Kellogg Company (d. 1951)
- April 23 – Archibald Murray, British general (d. 1945)
- May 2 – Theodor Herzl, Austrian founder of modern political Zionism (d. 1904)
- May 7 – Tom Norman, English freak showman (d. 1930)
- May 9 – J. M. Barrie, Scottish author (d. 1937)
- May 15 – Ellen Axson Wilson, First Lady of the United States (d. 1914)
- May 20 – Eduard Buchner, German chemist, Nobel Prize laureate (d. 1917)
- May 21 – Willem Einthoven, Dutch inventor, recipient of the Nobel Prize in Physiology or Medicine (d. 1927)
- May 25 – James McKeen Cattell, American psychologist (d. 1944)
- May 27 – Manuel Teixeira Gomes, 7th President of Portugal (d. 1941)
- May 29 – Isaac Albéniz, Spanish composer (d. 1909)
- June 20 – Jack Worrall, Australian cricketer, footballer, and coach (d. 1937)
- June 25 – Gustave Charpentier, French composer (d. 1956)

=== July–September ===
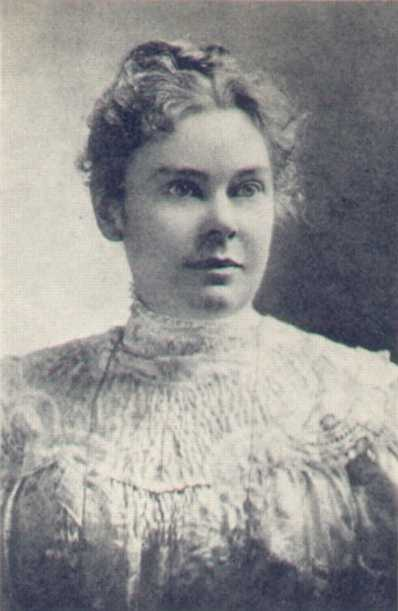
Lizzie Borden

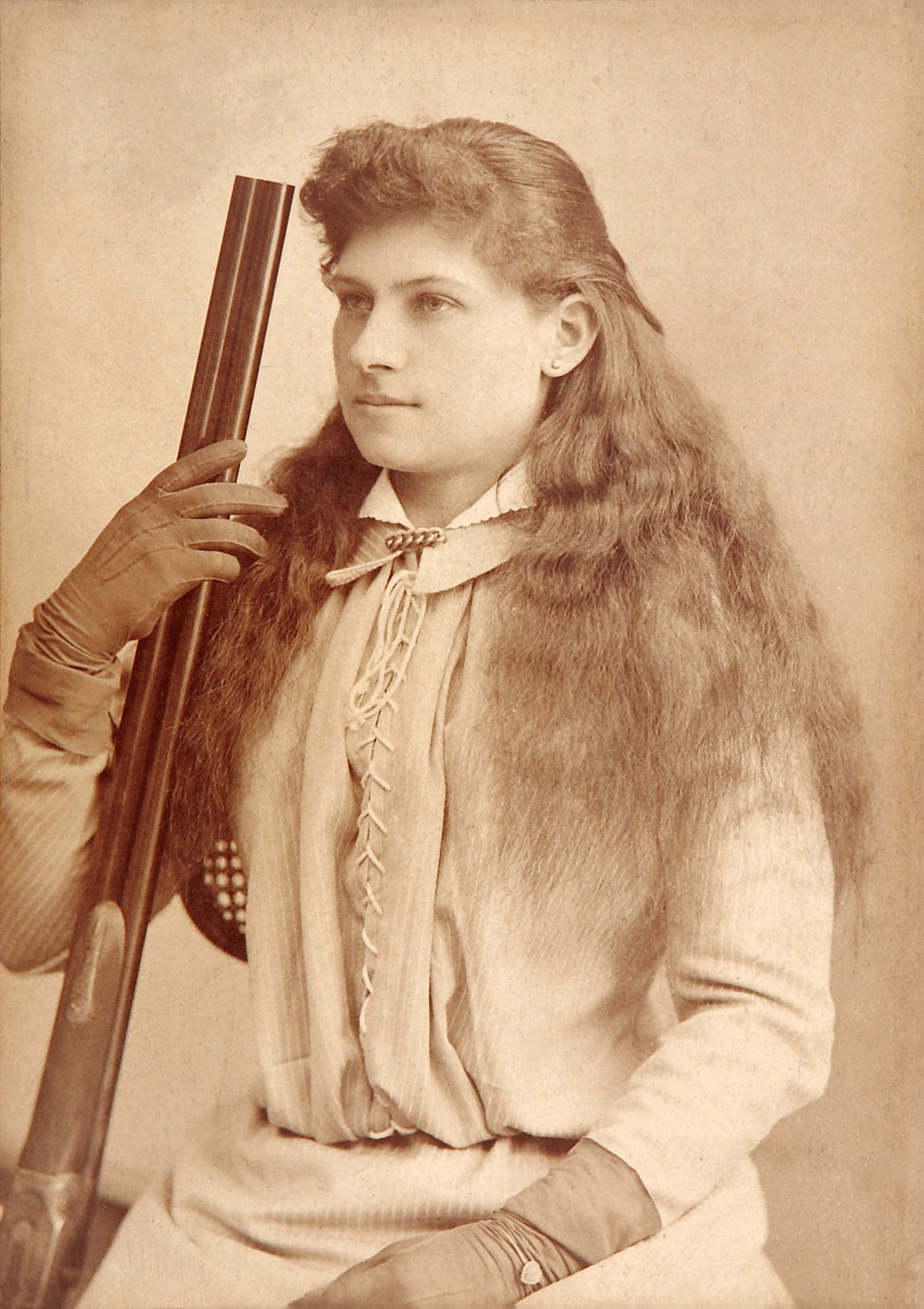
Annie Oakley

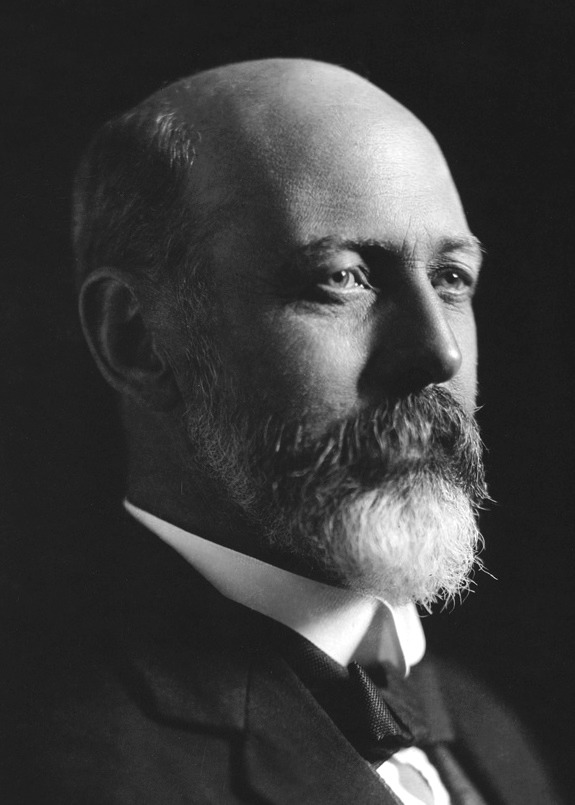
Joseph Cook

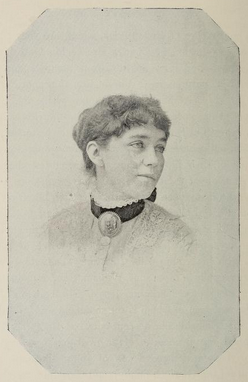
Georgina Fraser Newhall

- July 3 – Charlotte Perkins Gilman, American feminist (d. 1935)
- July 7 – Gustav Mahler, Austrian composer (d. 1911)
- July 13 – Gustav Bachmann, German admiral (d. 1943)
- July 16 – Otto Jespersen, Danish linguist, creator of Ido and Novial languages (d.1943)
- July 19 – Lizzie Borden, American murder suspect (d. 1927)
- July 31 – Sir George Warrender, 7th Baronet, British admiral (d. 1917)
- August 1 – Bazil Assan, Romanian engineer and explorer (d. 1918)
- August 3 – William Kennedy Dickson, Scottish inventor, cinema pioneer, and film director (d. 1935)
- August 5 – Louis Wain, English artist (d. 1939)
- August 7 – Alan Leo, British astrologer (d. 1917)
- August 10 – Vishnu Narayan Bhatkhande, Indian musician (d. 1936)
- August 13 – Annie Oakley, American Wild West show performer (d. 1926)
- August 15
  - Henrietta Vinton Davis, American elocutionist, dramatist, and impersonator (d. 1941)
  - Florence Harding, First Lady of the United States (d. 1924)
- August 16 – Jules Laforgue, French poet (d. 1887)
- August 20 – Raymond Poincaré, French president (d. 1934)
- August 22 – Alfred Ploetz, German physician, biologist, and eugenicist (d. 1940)
- August 25 – George Fawcett, American actor (d. 1939)
- August 26 – Eudora Stone Bumstead, American poet and hymnwriter (d. 1892)
- September 1 – Mary E. C. Bancker, American author (d. 1921)
- September 5 – Andrew Volstead, American politician (d. 1947)
- September 6 – Jane Addams, American social worker, recipient of the Nobel Peace Prize (d. 1935)
- September 7 – Anna Mary Robertson Moses (a.k.a. Grandma Moses), American painter (d. 1961)
- September 13 – John J. Pershing, American general (d. 1948)
- September 16 – Hermann Kusmanek von Burgneustädten, Austro-Hungarian general (d. 1934)

=== October–December ===
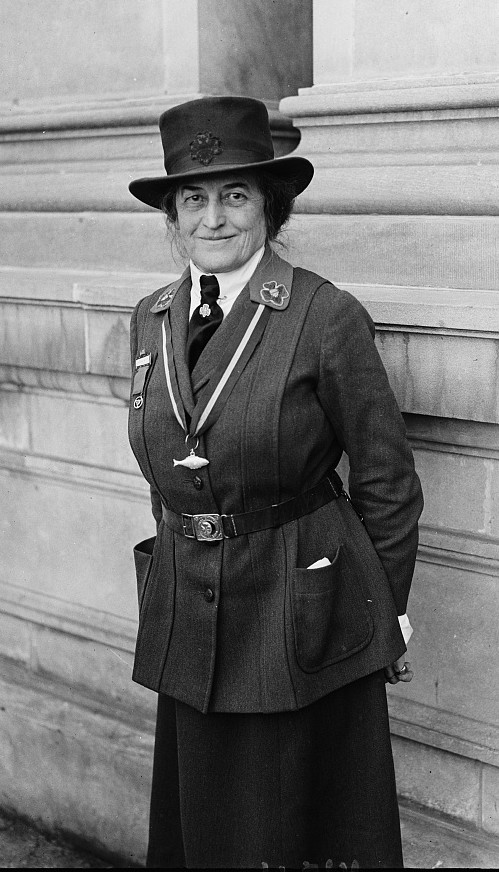
Juliette Gordon Low

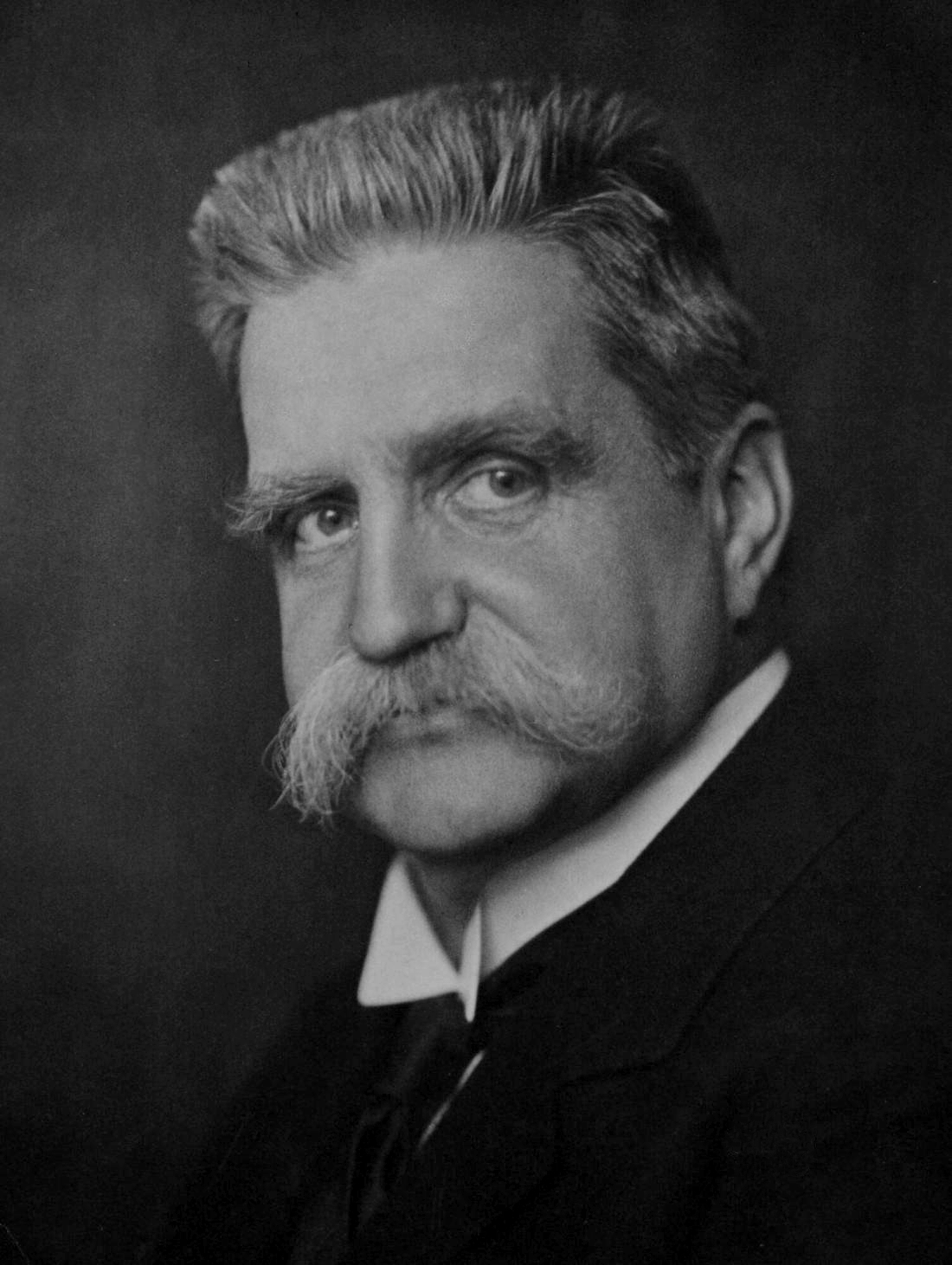
Hjalmar Branting

- October 31 – Juliette Gordon Low, American founder of the Girl Scouts (d. 1927)
- November 1 – Boies Penrose, United States Senator from Pennsylvania (d. 1921)
- November 2 – Soapy Smith, American con artist and gangster (d. 1898)
- November 6 – Ignacy Jan Paderewski, Polish pianist and composer, 3rd Prime Minister of Poland (d. 1941)
- November 16 – John Henry Kirby, Texas legislator, American businessman (d. 1940)
- November 23 – Hjalmar Branting, Prime Minister of Sweden, recipient of the Nobel Peace Prize (d. 1925)
- November 26 – Gabrielle Petit, French feminist activist (d. 1952)
- November 27 – Yui Mitsue, Japanese general (d. 1925)
- December 4 – Charles de Broqueville, Prime Minister of Belgium (d. 1940)
- December 7 – Joseph Cook, 6th Prime Minister of Australia (d. 1947)
- December 15 – Niels Ryberg Finsen, Danish physician, recipient of the Nobel Prize in Physiology or Medicine (d. 1904)
- December 16 – Ion Dragalina, Romanian general (d. 1916)
- December 25 – Manuel Dimech, Maltese philosopher, social reformer (d. 1921)
- December 31
  - Joseph S. Cullinan, American oil industrialist, founder of Texaco (d. 1937)
  - John T. Thompson, United States Army officer, inventor of the Tommy gun (d. 1940)

1861

=== January–June ===
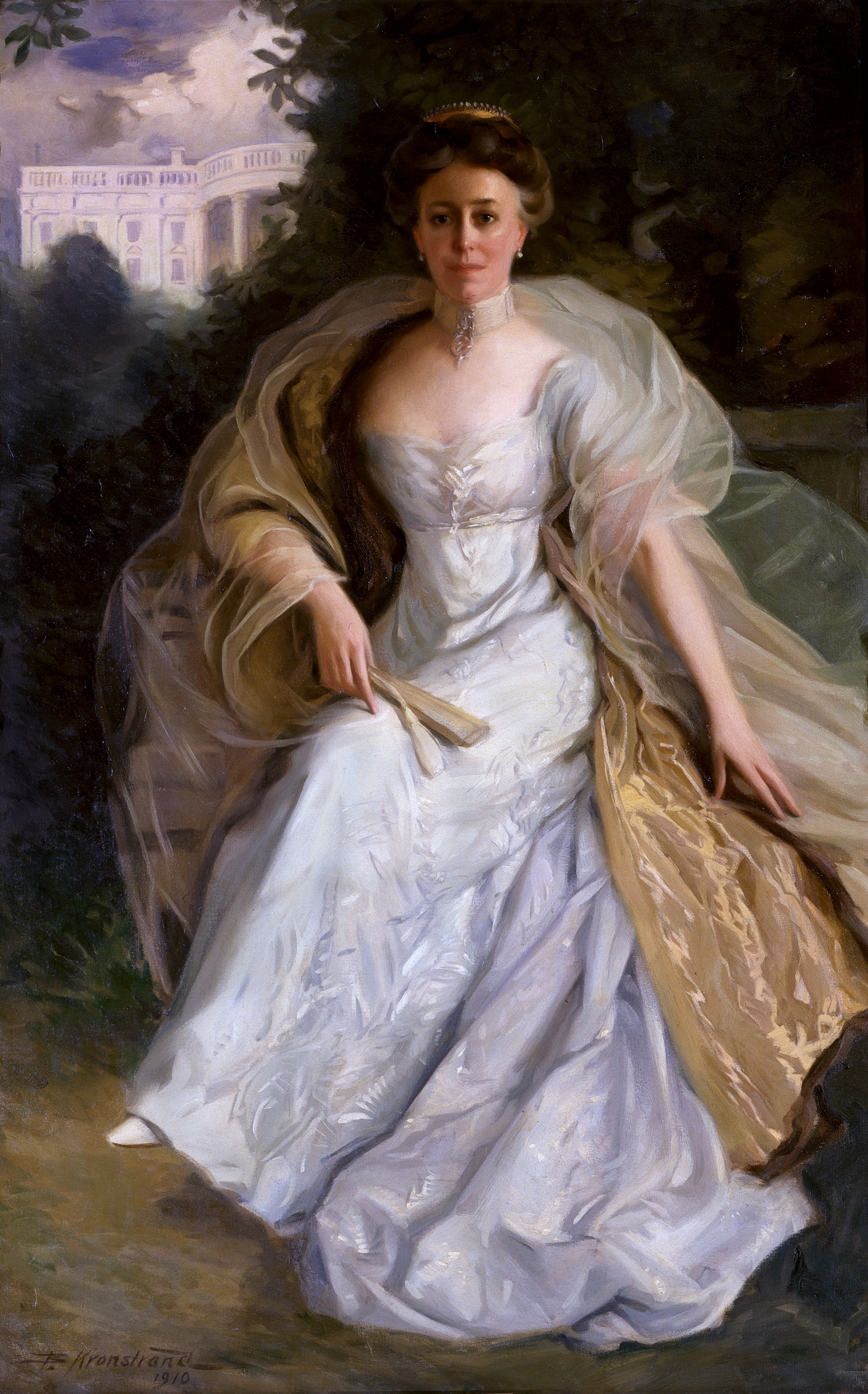
Helen Herron Taft

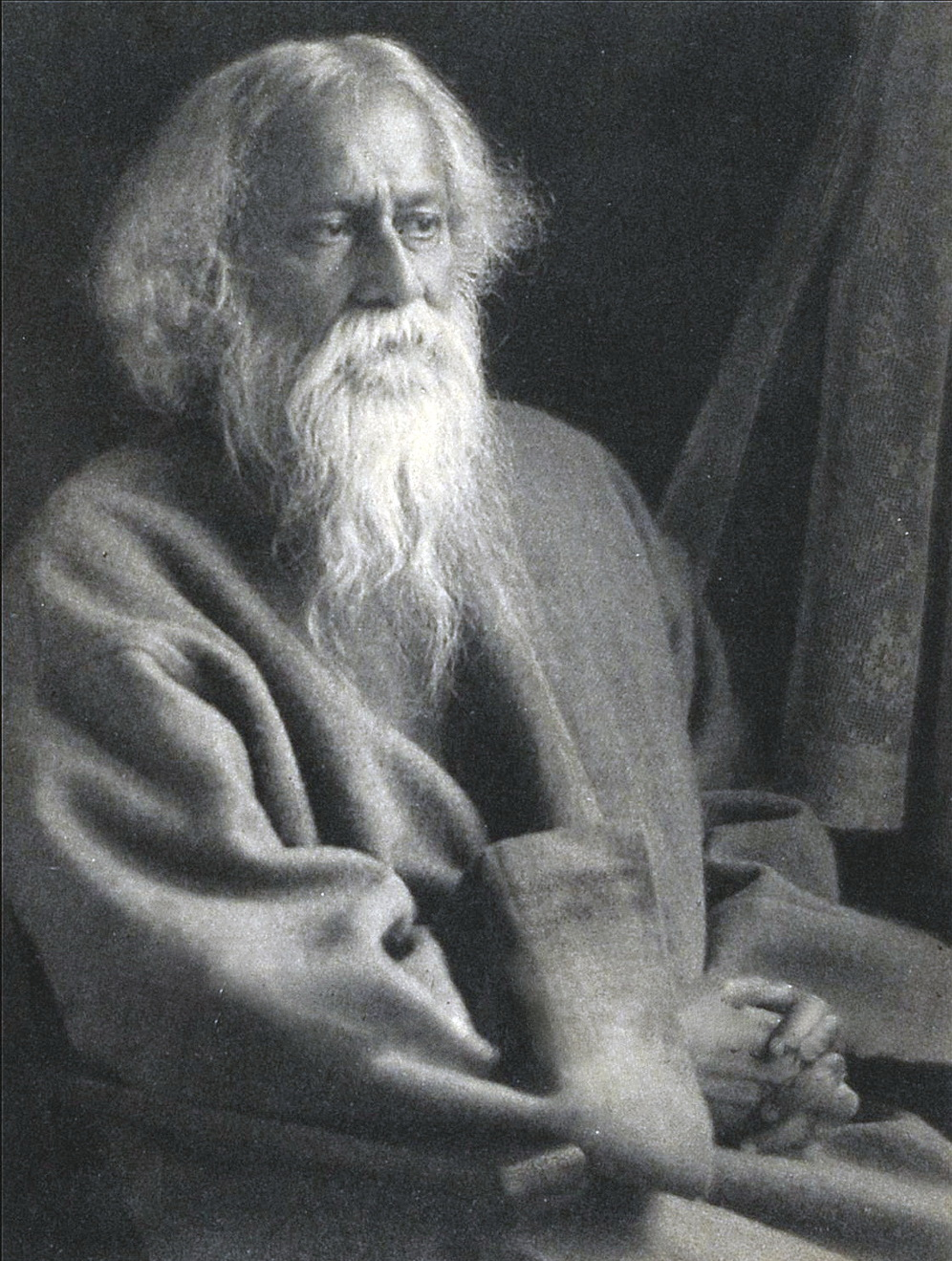
Rabindranath Tagore

- January 5 – Robert Lee Bullard, American general (d. 1947)
- January 6 – Victor Horta, Belgian architect and designer (d. 1947)
- January 10 – Germogen (Maximov), Russian Orthodox Metropolitan (d. 1945)
- January 14 – Mehmed VI, Ottoman Sultan (d. 1926)
- January 27 – Constantin Prezan, Romanian general, Marshal of Romania (d. 1943)
- January 28
  - Julián Felipe, Filipino musician, bandleader (d. 1944)
  - Ramón Meza y Suárez Inclán, Cuban literary critic, historian, professor and author (d. 1911)
- January 30 – Charles Martin Loeffler, American composer (d. 1935)
- February 12 – Lou Andreas-Salomé, Russian-born author (d. 1937)
- February 15
  - Charles Édouard Guillaume, French physicist, Nobel Prize laureate (d. 1938)
  - Alfred North Whitehead, English mathematician and philosopher (d. 1947)
- February 17 – Princess Helena of Waldeck and Pyrmont, Duchess of Albany, German-born member of the British royal family (d. 1922)
- February 19 – Henry Horne, 1st Baron Horne, British general (d. 1929)
- February 22
  - Lewis Akeley, American academic (d. 1961)
  - Mabelle Biggart, American elocutionist (unknown year of death)
  - Katō Tomosaburō, Imperial Japanese Navy officer, 12th Prime Minister of Japan (d. 1923)
- February 26 – King Ferdinand I of Bulgaria (d. 1948)
- February 27 – Rudolf Steiner, Austrian philosopher, social reformer and author (d. 1925)
- March 2 – Nikola Ivanov, Bulgarian general (d. 1940)
- March 21 – Charles Swickard, German-American film director (d. 1929)
- April 3 – Alice Sollier, French doctor, first Black French woman to qualify as a medical doctor (d. 1942)
- April 6 – Stanislas de Guaita, French poet (d. 1897)
- April 8 – Son Byong-hi, Korean independence activist (d. 1922)
- April 15 – Bliss Carman, Canadian poet (d. 1929)
- April 22 – István Tisza, 2-time prime minister of Hungary (d. 1918)
- April 22 – Hinke Bergegren, Swedish anarchist and birth control agitator (d. 1936)
- April 23 – Edmund Allenby, 1st Viscount Allenby, British soldier, administrator (d. 1936)
- April 26 – Rudolf Stöger-Steiner von Steinstätten, Austro-Hungarian general and politician (d. 1921)
- May 5 – Peter Cooper Hewitt, American electrical engineer, inventor (d. 1921)
- May 7 – Rabindranath Tagore, Poet, novelist, dramatist, essayist, story-writer, composer, painter, philosopher, social reformer, educationist, linguist, grammarian, and Nobel Prize in Literature laureate for the collection of poems Gitanjali. (d. 1941)
- May 11 – Frederick Russell Burnham, American scouter (d. 1947)
- May 14 – Harro Magnussen, German sculptor (d. 1908)
- May 16 – Herman Webster Mudgett (alias H. H. Holmes), American serial killer (d. 1896)
- May 24 – Gerald Strickland, 4th prime minister of Malta, 23rd Governor of New South Wales, 15th Governor of Western Australia and 9th Governor of Tasmania (d. 1940)
- June 2 – Helen Herron Taft, First Lady of the United States (d. 1943)
- June 19 – José Rizal, Filipino national hero (d. 1896)
- June 20 – Frederick Gowland Hopkins, English biochemist, recipient of the Nobel Prize in Physiology or Medicine (d. 1947)
- June 22 – Maximilian von Spee, German admiral (d. 1914)
- June 27 – Fanny Davies, Guernesiaise pianist (d. 1934)

=== July–December ===
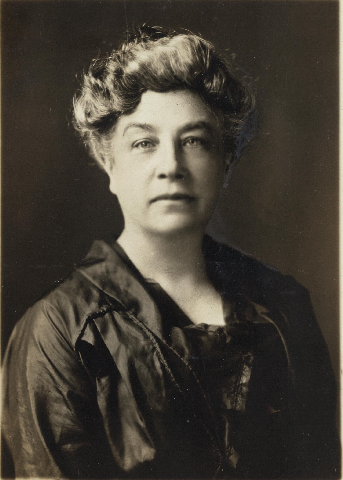
Kate M. Gordon

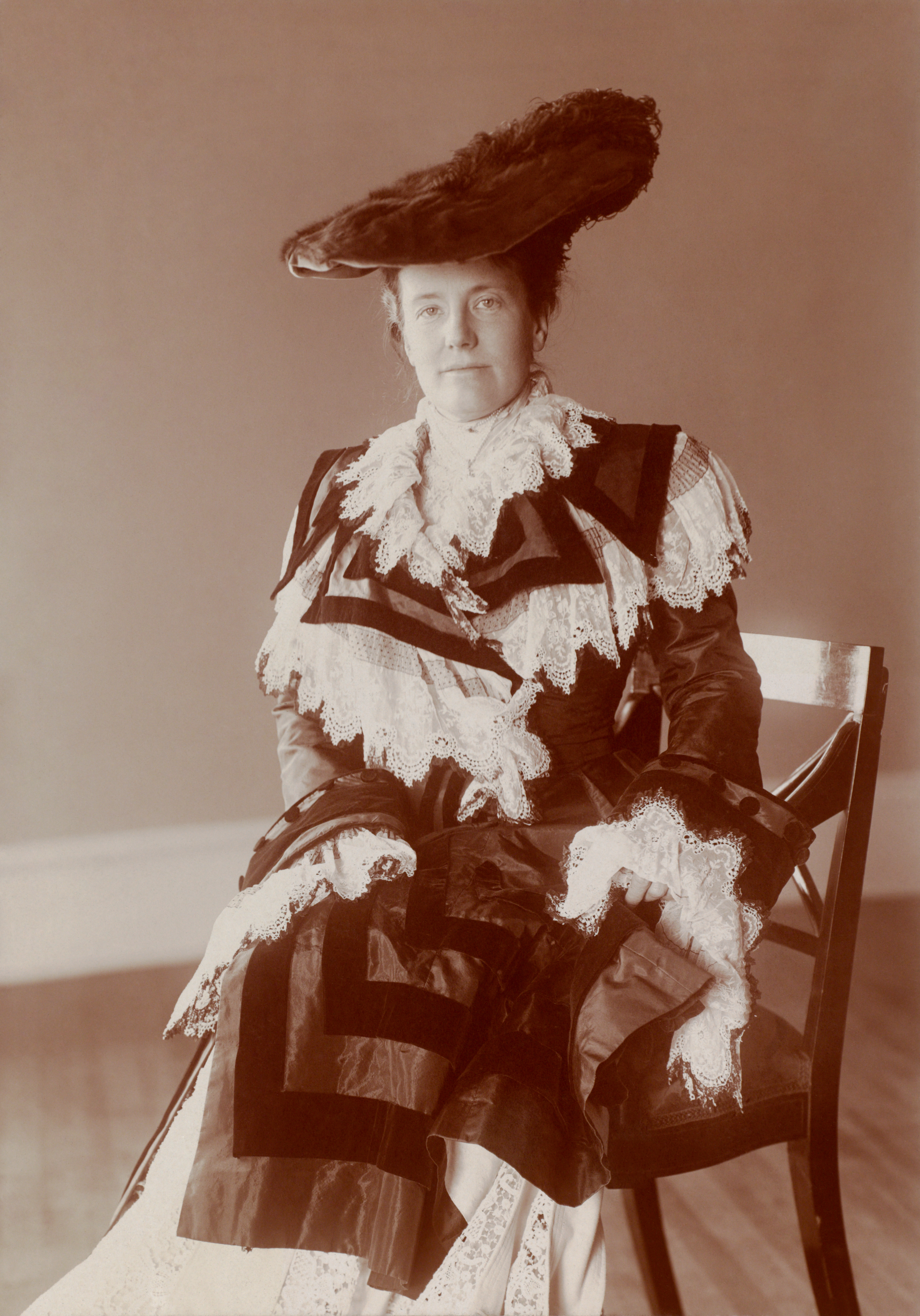
Edith Roosevelt

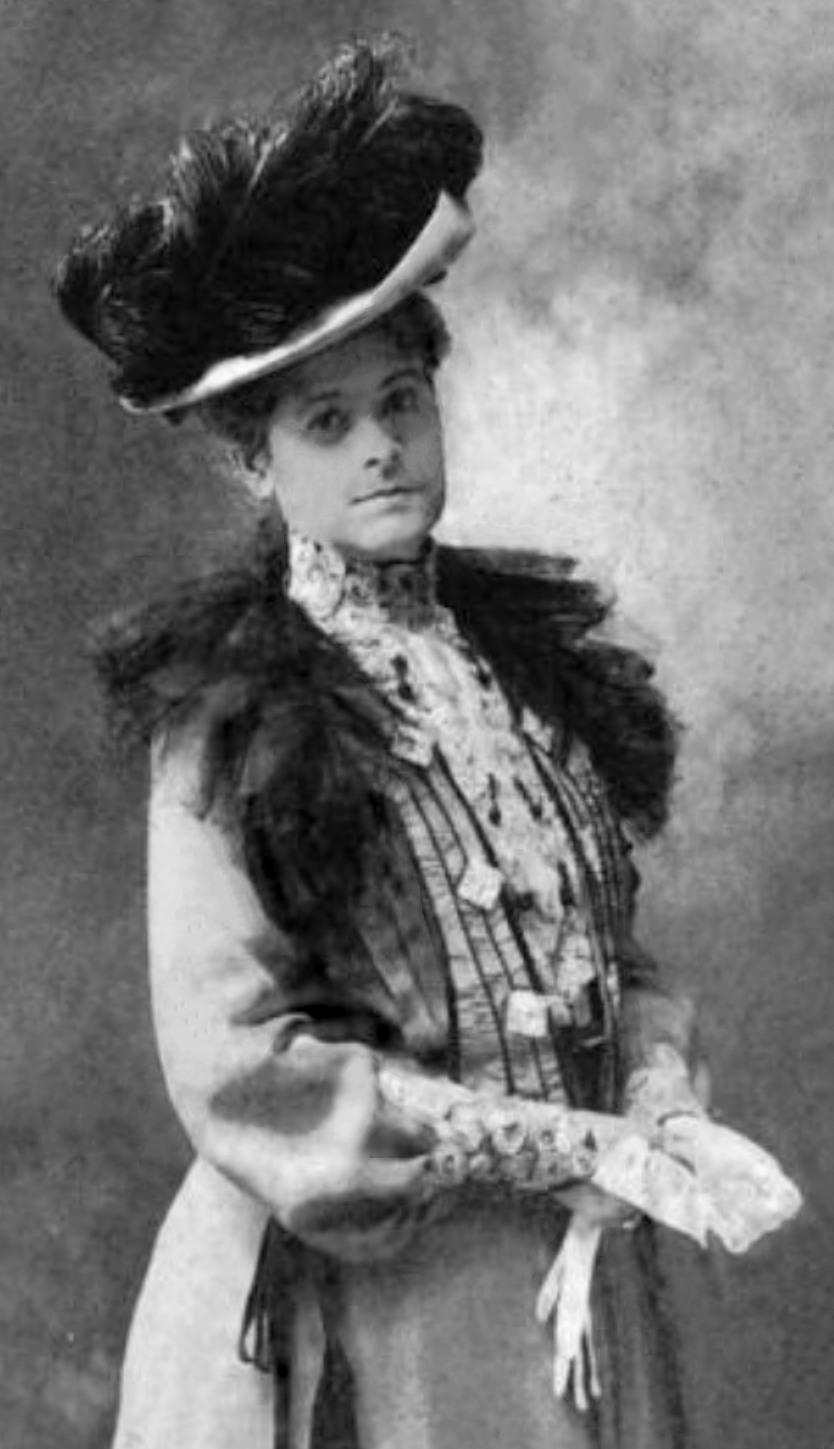
Myra Belle Martin

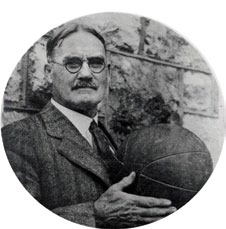
James Naismith

- July 7 – Nettie Stevens, American geneticist credited with the discovery of sex chromosomes (d. 1912)
- July 14 – Kate M. Gordon, American suffragette (d. 1932)
  - July 18 – Kadambini Ganguly, first Indian female doctor (d. 1923)
- August 2 – Edith Cowan, Australian social reformer and politician (d. 1932)
- August 4
  - Henry Head, English neurologist (d. 1940)
  - Daniel Edward Howard, 16th president of Liberia (d. 1935)
- August 6 – Edith Roosevelt, First Lady of the United States (d. 1948)
- August 7 – Spencer S. Wood, United States Navy rear admiral (d. 1940)
- August 9 – Dorothea Klumpke, American astronomer, Director of the Bureau of Measurements at the Paris Observatory (d. 1942)
- August 10 – Almroth Wright, British bacteriologist, immunologist (d. 1947)
- August 24 – Simon de Graaff, Dutch civil servant, politician (d. 1948)
- September 2 – Henrietta Crosman, American stage, film actress (d. 1944)
- September 7 – Patriarch Ambrosius of Georgia (d. 1927)
- September 10 – Niels Hansen Jacobsen, Danish sculptor, ceramist (d. 1941)
- September 11
  - Juhani Aho, Finnish author, journalist (d. 1921)
  - Erich von Falkenhayn, German general (d. 1922)
- September 15
  - M. Visvesvaraya, Indian civil engineer (d. 1962)
- September 23
  - Robert Bosch, German industrialist, engineer and inventor (d. 1942)
  - Mary Elizabeth Coleridge, British poet, novelist (d. 1907)
- September 30
  - Morgan Robertson, American author (d. 1915)
  - William Wrigley Jr., American chewing gum industrialist (d. 1932)
- October 4 – Frederic Remington, American cowboy artist, sculptor (d. 1909)
- October 6 – Myra Belle Martin, American financier (d. 1936)
- October 10 – Fridtjof Nansen, Norwegian explorer, scientist and humanitarian, Nobel Prize laureate (d. 1930)
- October 16 – J. B. Bury, British historian (d. 1927)
- October 24 – Alexey Kaledin, Russian general (d. 1918)
- October 30 – Antoine Bourdelle, French sculptor (d. 1929)
- November 4
  - Dimitrios Ioannou, Greek general (d. 1926)
  - Alice Gossage, American journalist (d. 1929)
- November 6 – James Naismith, Canadian inventor of basketball (d. 1939)
- November 14
  - William Allardyce, British colonial governor (d. 1930)
  - Frederick Jackson Turner, American historian (d. 1932)
- November 16 – Georgina Febres-Cordero, Venezuelan nun (d. 1925)
- November 23 – Clara H. Hazelrigg, American author, educator and reformer (d. 1937)
- November 24 – August Bier, German surgeon (d. 1949)
- December 4
  - Lillian Russell, American singer, vaudeville star (d. 1922)
  - Hannes Hafstein, 1st Prime Minister of Iceland (d. 1922)
- December 5 – Armando Diaz, Italian general, Marshal of Italy (d. 1928)
- December 7 – Henri Mathias Berthelot, French general (d. 1931)
- December 8
  - Aristide Maillol, French sculptor (d. 1944)
  - Georges Méliès, French film director (d. 1938)
- December 15 – Pehr Evind Svinhufvud, Prime Minister and President of Finland (d. 1944)
- December 16 – Antonio de La Gándara, French painter (d. 1917)
- December 20 – Ivana Kobilca, Slovenian painter (d. 1926)
- December 29 – Kurt Hensel, German mathematician (d. 1941)

=== Date unknown ===
- Dixie Haygood, American magician (d. 1915)
- Kallirhoe Parren, founder of the Greek women's movement (d. 1940)
- Victoire Jean-Baptiste, Haitian politician (d. 1923)
- Abba Jifar II, king of the Gibe Kingdom of Jimma (d. 1932)

1862

=== January–March ===
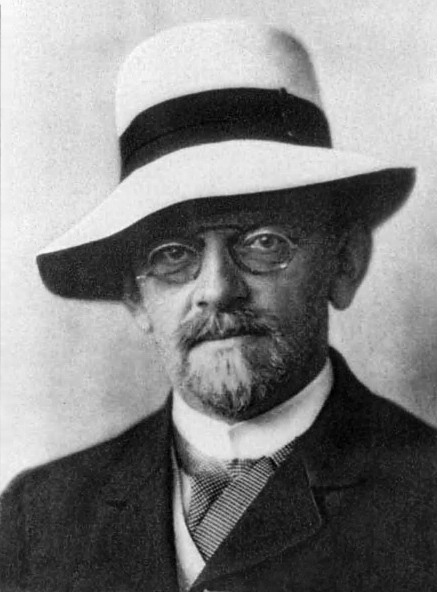
David Hilbert

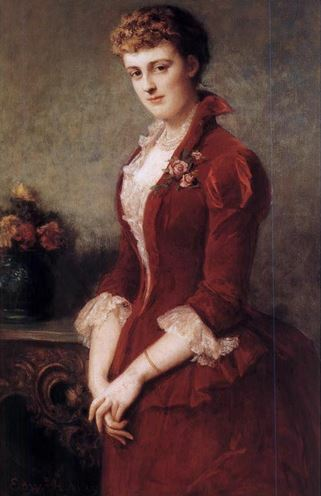
Edith Wharton

- January 9 – Carrie Clark Ward, American silent film actress (d. 1926)
- January 14 – Carrie Derick, Canadian botanist and geneticist (d. 1941)
- January 15 – Loie Fuller, American dancer (d. 1928)
- January 23 – David Hilbert, German mathematician (d. 1943)
- January 24 – Edith Wharton, American fiction writer (d. 1937)
- January 29 – Frederick Delius, English composer (d. 1934)
- January 30 – Walter Damrosch, German-born American orchestral conductor (d. 1950)
- February 3 – James Clark McReynolds, Associate Justice of the Supreme Court of the United States (d. 1946)
- February 4
  - Hjalmar Hammarskjöld, 13th Prime Minister of Sweden (d. 1953)
  - George Ernest Morrison, Australian adventurer, journalist (d. 1920)
- February 7 – Bernard Maybeck, American Arts and Crafts architect (d. 1957)
- February 8 – Ferdinand Ferber, French Army captain, aviation pioneer (d. 1909)
- February 17 – Edward German, English composer (d. 1936)
- March 4 – Robert Emden, Swiss astrophysicist, meteorologist (d. 1940)
- March 8 – George Frederick Phillips, Canadian-born American military hero (d. 1904)
- March 13 – Jane Delano, American founder of the American Red Cross Nursing Service (d. 1919)
- March 14 – Vilhelm Bjerknes, Norwegian physicist, meteorologist (d. 1951)
- March 25 – George Sutherland, American politician, Associate Justice of the Supreme Court of the United States (d. 1942)
- March 28 – Aristide Briand, French politician, winner of the Nobel Peace Prize (d. 1932)
- March 29 – Adolfo Müller-Ury, Swiss-born American painter (d. 1947)

=== April–June ===
- April 2 – Nicholas Murray Butler, American president of Columbia University, winner of the Nobel Peace Prize (d. 1947)
- April 6 – Georges Darien, French writer (d. 1921)
- April 11
  - Charles Evans Hughes, American jurist, politician, Chief Justice of the United States (d. 1948)
  - Lurana W. Sheldon, American author and editor (d. 1945)
- April 26 – Edmund C. Tarbell, American Impressionist painter (d. 1938)
- April 27 – Rudolph Schildkraut, Ottoman-born Austrian actor (d. 1930)
- May 15 – Arthur Schnitzler, Austrian dramatist, narrator (d. 1931)
- May 27 – John Kendrick Bangs, American author, satirist (d. 1922)
- June 5 – Allvar Gullstrand, Swedish ophthalmologist, winner of the Nobel Prize in Physiology or Medicine (d. 1930)
- June 7 – Philipp Lenard, Hungarian–German physicist, winner of the Nobel Prize in Physics (d. 1947)
- June 10 – John de Robeck, British admiral (d. 1928)
- June 21 – Damrong Rajanubhab, Thai prince, historian (d. 1943)
- June 27 – May Irwin, Canadian actress, singer (d. 1938)

=== July–September ===
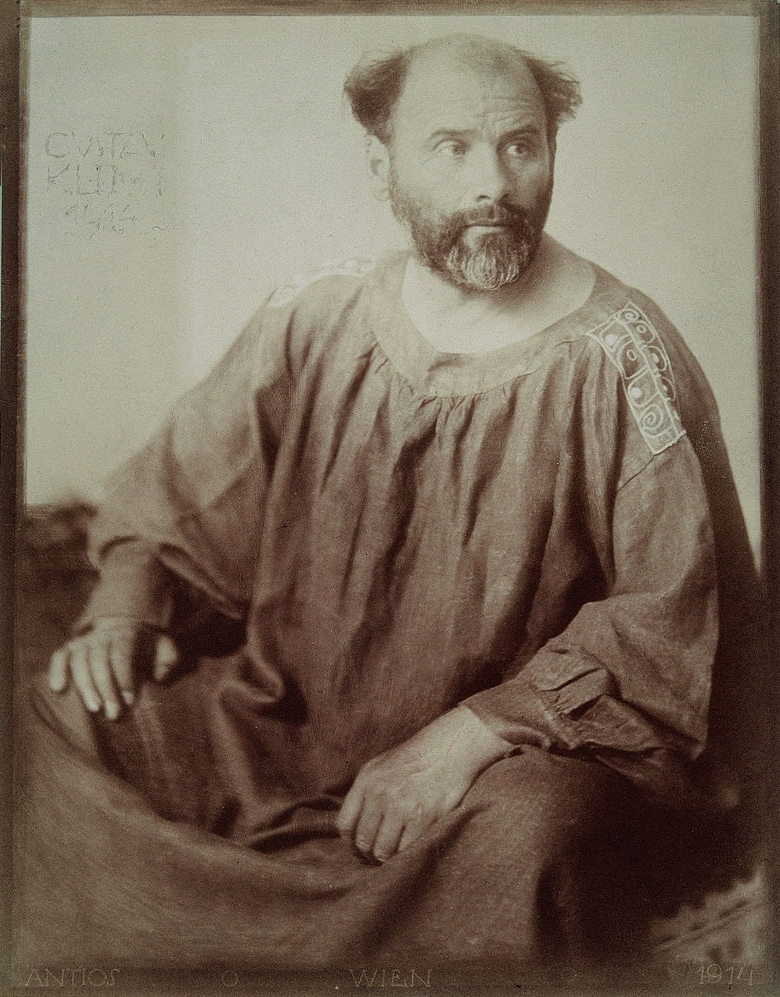
Gustav Klimt

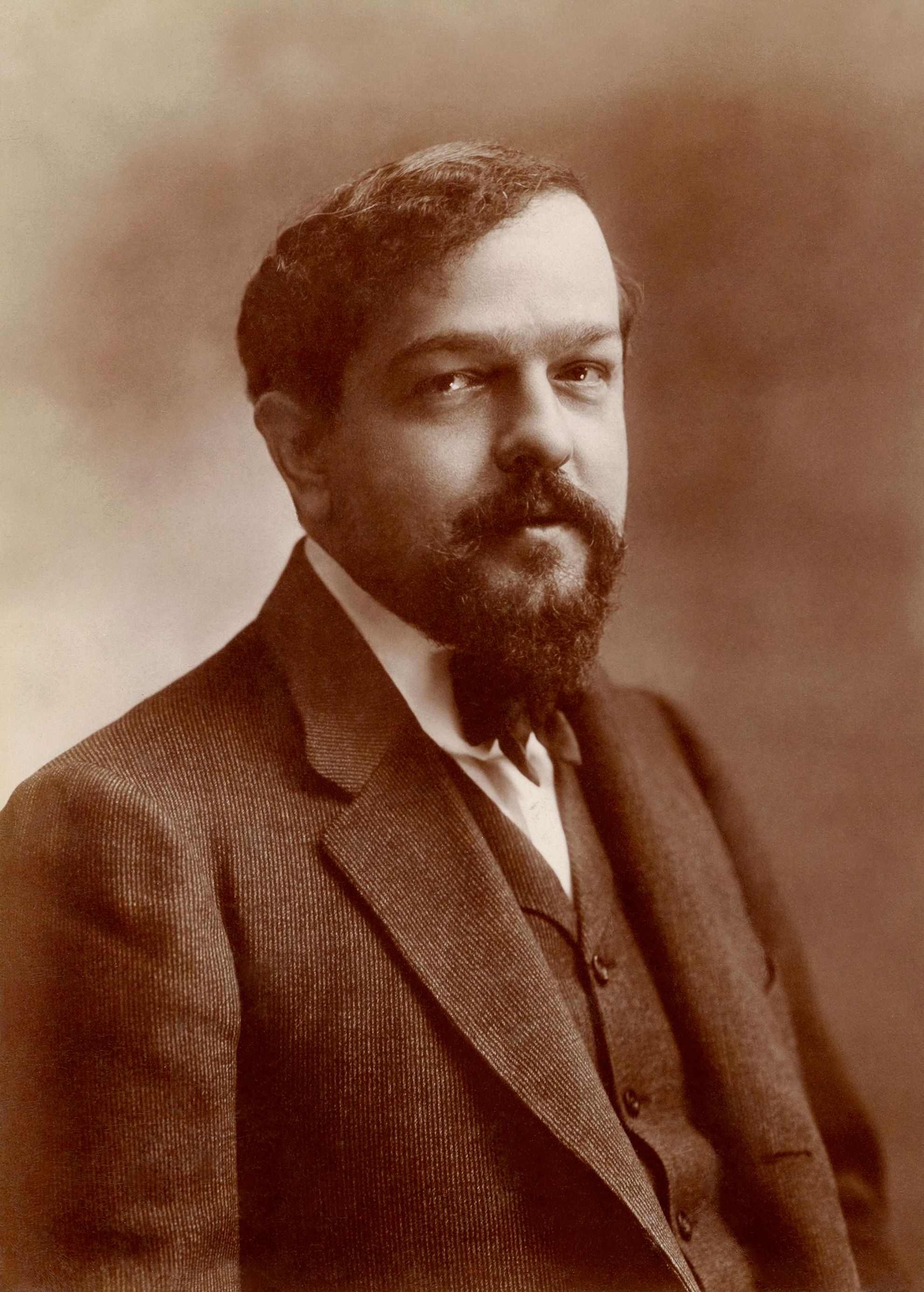
Claude Debussy

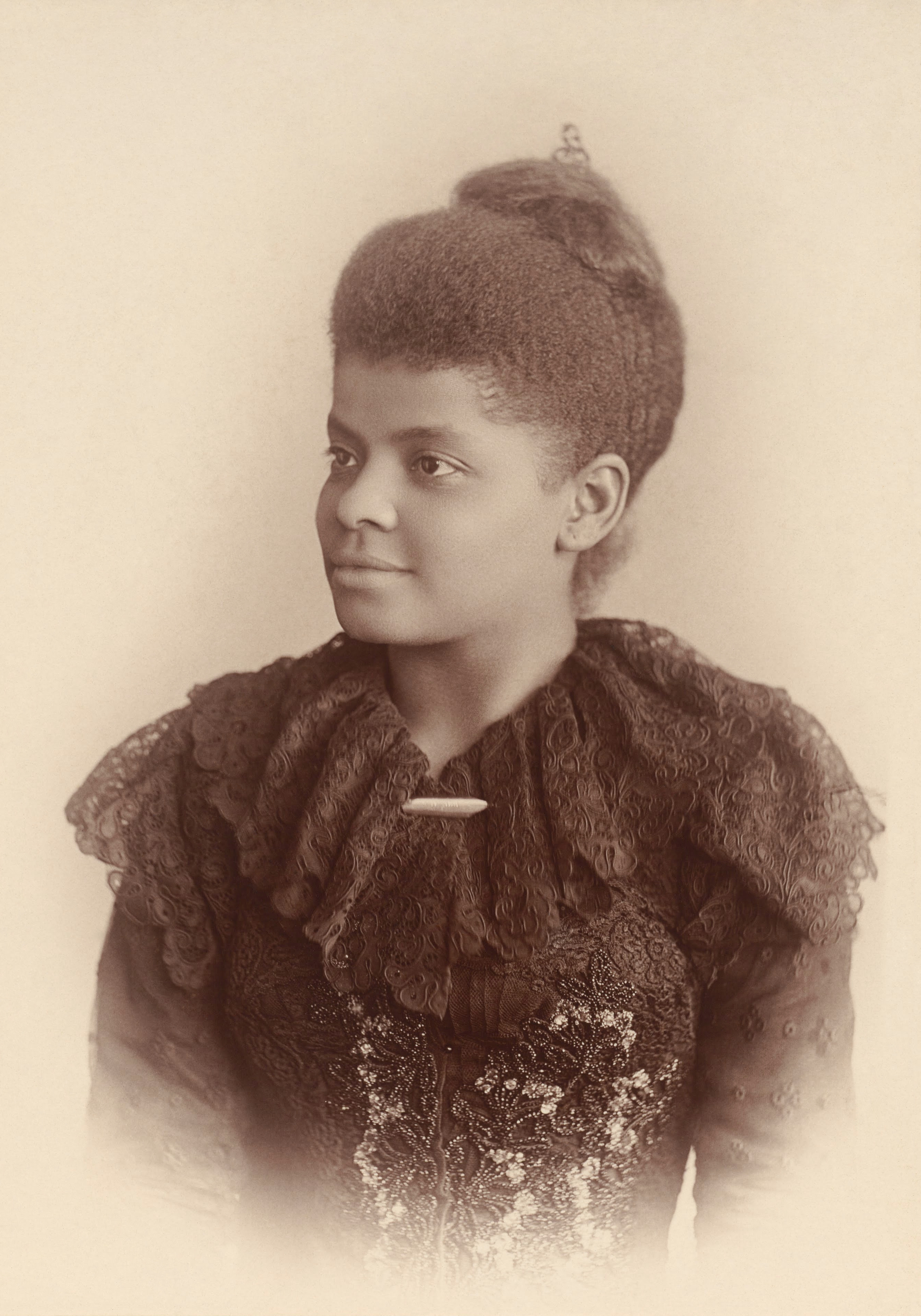
Ida B. Wells

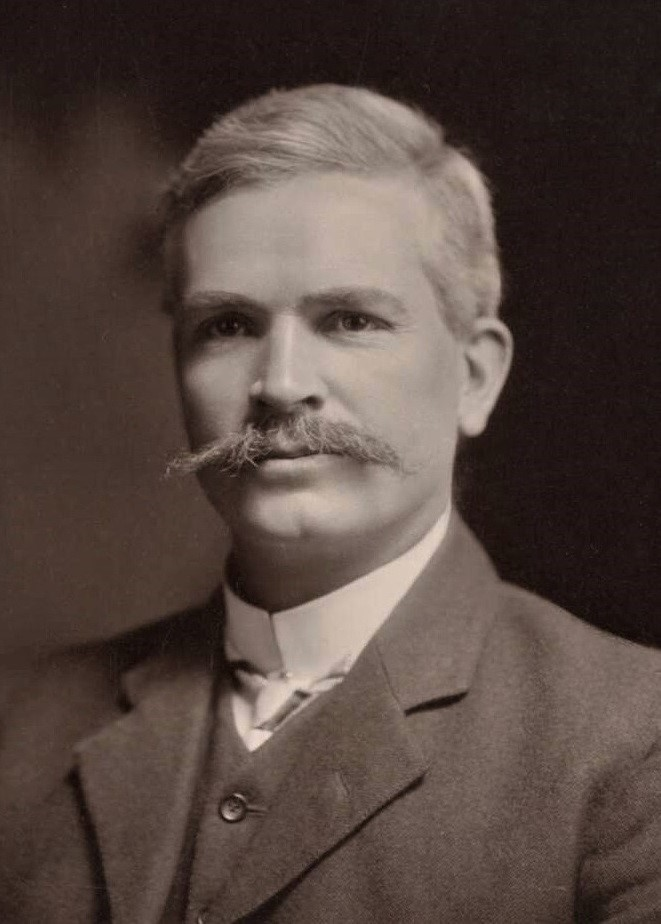
Andrew Fisher

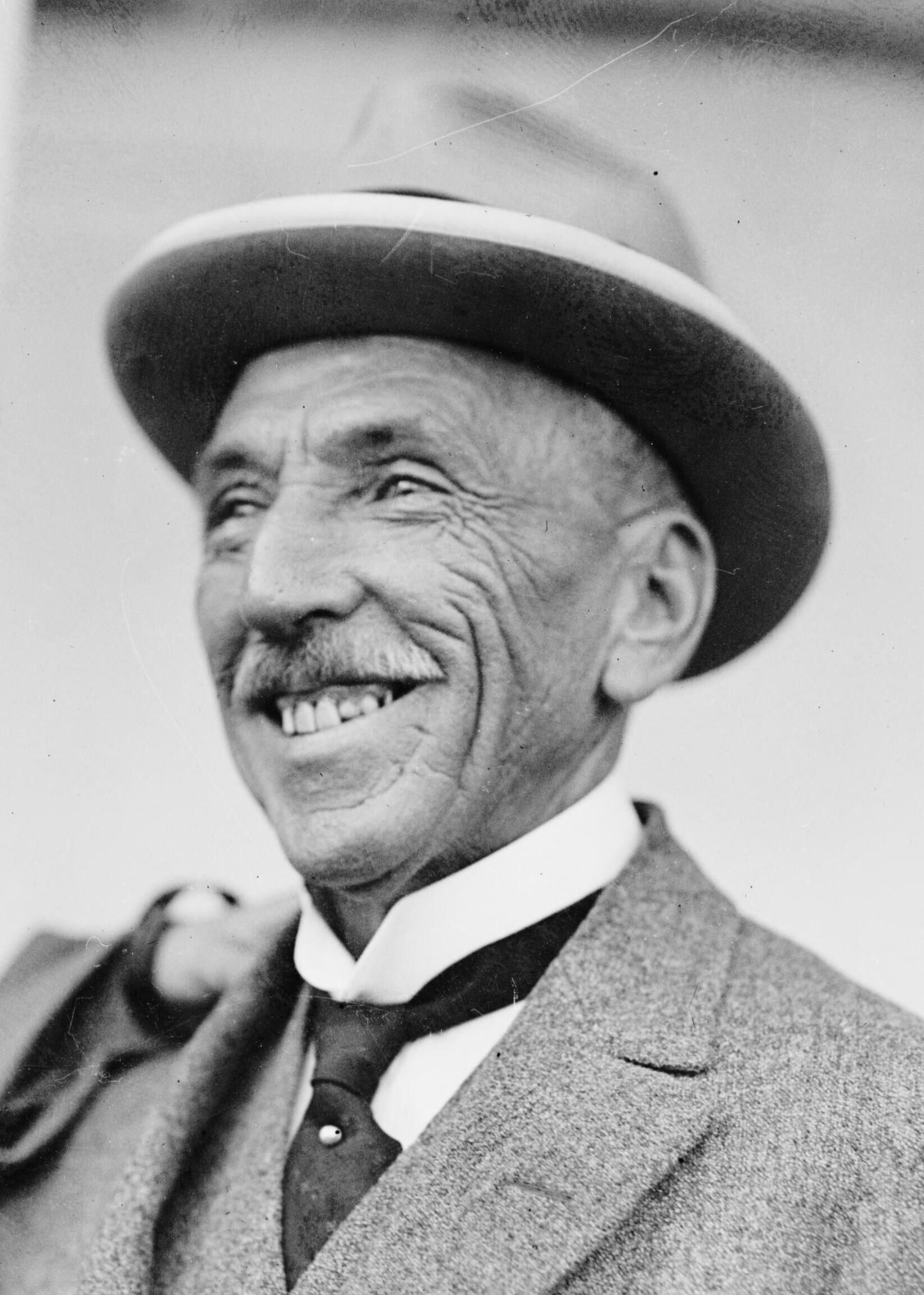
Billy Hughes

- July 2
  - William Henry Bragg, English physicist, Nobel Prize laureate (d. 1942)
  - Christopher Cradock, British admiral (d. 1914)
- July 8 – Josephine White Bates, Canadian-born American author (d. 1934)
- July 14
  - Florence Bascom, American geologist and educator (d. 1945)
  - Gustav Klimt, Austrian artist (d. 1918)
- July 15 – Ernest Troubridge, British admiral (d. 1926)
- July 16 – Ida B. Wells, American journalist, suffragist, and anti-lynching crusader (d. 1931)
- July 24 – Percy FitzPatrick, South African author, politician and mining financier (d. 1931)
- August 1 – M. R. James, English medievalist scholar and author (d. 1936)
- August 5 – Joseph Merrick (the Elephant Man), English sufferer from deformities (d. 1890)
- August 16 – Amos Alonzo Stagg, American football player, coach (d. 1965)
- August 21 – Emilio Salgari, Italian writer (d. 1911)
- August 22 – Claude Debussy, French composer (d. 1918)
- August 24 – Zonia Baber, American geographer and geologist (d. 1956)
- August 26 – Herbert Booth, English-born Salvationist, third son of William and Catherine Booth (d. 1926)
- August 29
  - Andrew Fisher, 5th Prime Minister of Australia (d. 1928)
  - Maurice Maeterlinck, Belgian writer, Nobel Prize in Literature laureate (d. 1949)
- September 7 – Edgar Speyer, American-born international financier and philanthropist (d. 1932)
- September 11
  - Julian Byng, 1st Viscount Byng of Vimy, British general, 12th Governor General of Canada (d. 1935)
  - Hawley Harvey Crippen, American-born medical practitioner, uxoricide (hanged 1910)
  - O. Henry, born William Sydney Porter, American short-story writer (d. 1910)
- September 12 – Carl Eytel, German-American artist working in Palm Springs, California (d. 1925)
- September 19 – Arvid Lindman, Swedish admiral, industrialist, and politician, 12th Prime Minister of Sweden (d. 1936)
- September 22 – Anastasios Charalambis, Prime Minister of Greece (d. 1949)
- September 23 – Denis Auguste Duchêne, French general (d. 1950)
- September 25 – Billy Hughes, 7th Prime Minister of Australia (d. 1952)
- September 27 – Louis Botha, Boer general, first Prime Minister of South Africa (d. 1919)

=== October–December ===
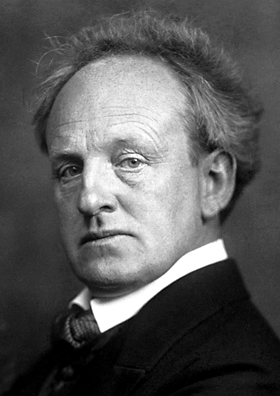
Gerhart Hauptmann

- October 3 – Johnny Briggs, English cricketer (d. 1902)
- October 12 – Theodor Boveri, German biologist (d. 1915)
- October 13 – Mary Kingsley, English explorer (d. 1900)
- October 18 – Mehmet Esat Bülkat, Ottoman general (d. 1952)
- October 19 – Auguste Lumière, French inventor (d. 1954)
- October 26 – Hilma af Klint, Swedish abstract painter (d. 1944)
- October 27 – Hugh Evan-Thomas, British admiral (d. 1928)
- October 28 – Nicholas Timothy Clerk, Gold Coast theologian, missionary and Presbyterian minister (d. 1961)
- November 5 – Annie Laurie Wilson James, American journalist focused on horses (unknown year of death)
- November 14 – George Washington Vanderbilt II, American businessman (d. 1914)
- November 15 – Gerhart Hauptmann, German writer, Nobel Prize laureate (d. 1946)
- November 16 – Charles Turner, Australian cricketer (d. 1944)
- November 19 – Billy Sunday, American baseball player, evangelist and prohibitionist (d. 1935)
- November 23 – Ernest Guglielminetti, Swiss physician (d. 1943)
- November 24 – Konrad Krafft von Dellmensingen, Bavarian general (d. 1953)
- December 5
  - William Walker Atkinson, American spiritual writer (d. 1932)
  - John Henry Leech, English entomologist (d. 1900)
- December 8 – Georges Feydeau, French playwright (d. 1921)
- December 12 – J. Bruce Ismay, English shipping magnate, White Star Line (d. 1937)
- December 15 – Adrien Loir, French biologist, bacteriologist (d. 1941)
- December 25 – Wilhelm Weinberg, German physician (d. 1937)

=== Date unknown ===
- Al Herpin (The Man Who Never Slept), notable French-born American insomniac (d. 1947)
- Jessie King, Scottish author (unknown year of death)
- Antoinette Kinney, American state senator (d. 1945)
- Sufi Azizur Rahman, Bengali Muslim theologian and teacher (d. 1922)

1863

=== January–March ===
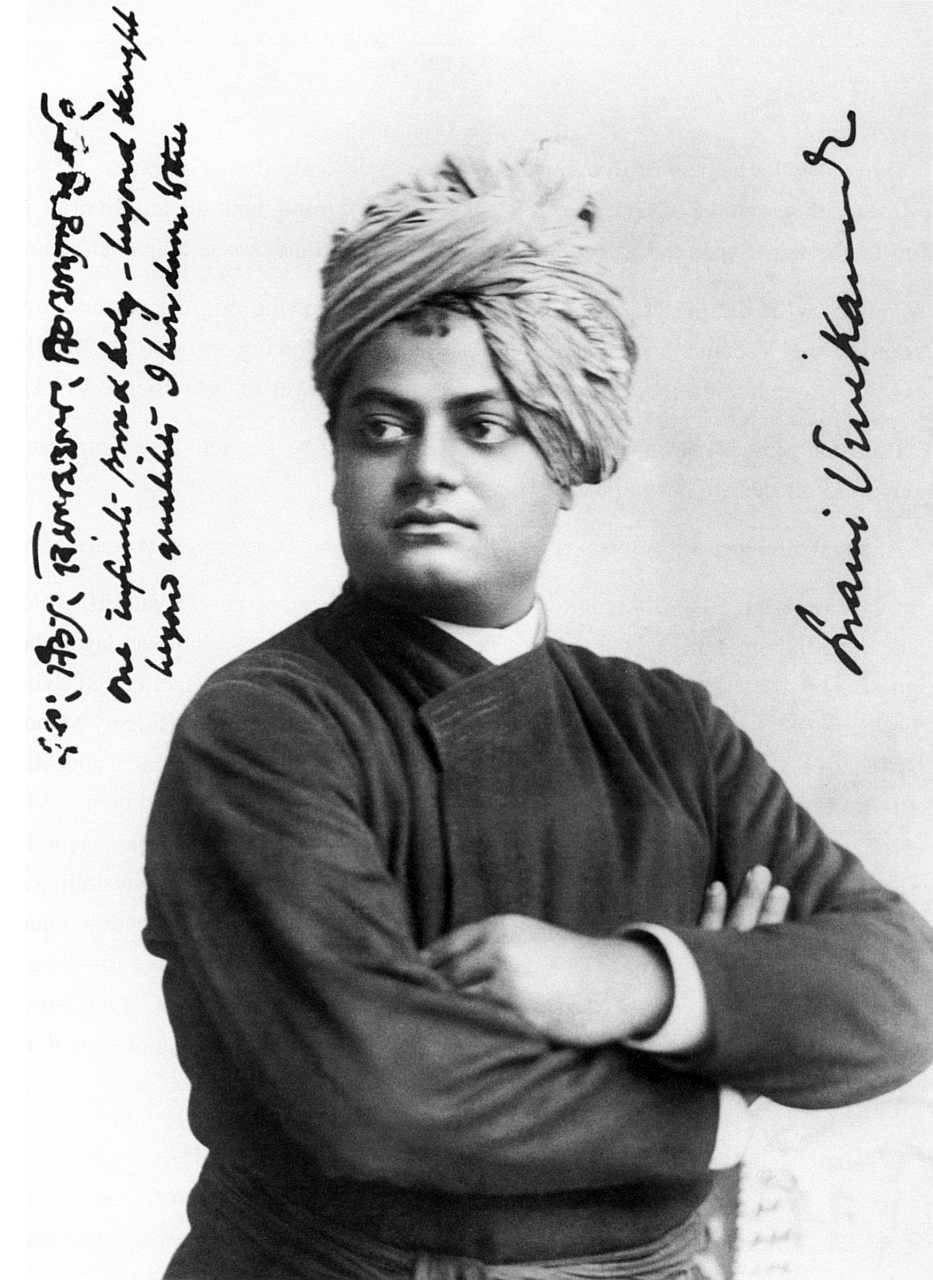
Swami Vivekananda

- January 1 – Pierre de Coubertin, French founder of the modern Olympic Games (d. 1937)
- January 7 – Anna Murray Vail, American botanist and first librarian of the New York Botanical Garden (d. 1955)
- January 12 – Swami Vivekananda, Indian Hindu religious leader (d. 1902)
- January 14 – Manuel Gomes da Costa, Portuguese general, 10th president of Portugal (d. 1929)
- January 15 – Wilhelm Marx, Chancellor of Germany (d. 1946)
- January 17
  - David Lloyd George, Prime Minister of the United Kingdom (d. 1945)
  - Constantin Stanislavski, Russian theatre practitioner, founder of modern realistic acting (d. 1938)
- January 28 – Ernest William Christmas, Australian painter (d. 1918)
- February 11 – John F. Fitzgerald, Mayor of Boston (d. 1950)
- March 1 – Sydney Deane, Australian cricketer, actor (d. 1934)
- March 9 – Emelie Tracy Y. Swett, American author (d. 1892)
- March 11 – Andrew Stoddart, English sportsman (d. 1915)
- March 12 – Gabriele D'Annunzio, Italian writer, war hero and politician (d. 1938)
- March 13 – Maria Mikhailovich Volkonskaya, Russian princess, Catholic convert and writer (d. 1943)
- March 19 – Howard Gould, American actor (d. 1938)
- March 27 – Henry Royce, English automobile pioneer (d. 1933)

=== April–June ===
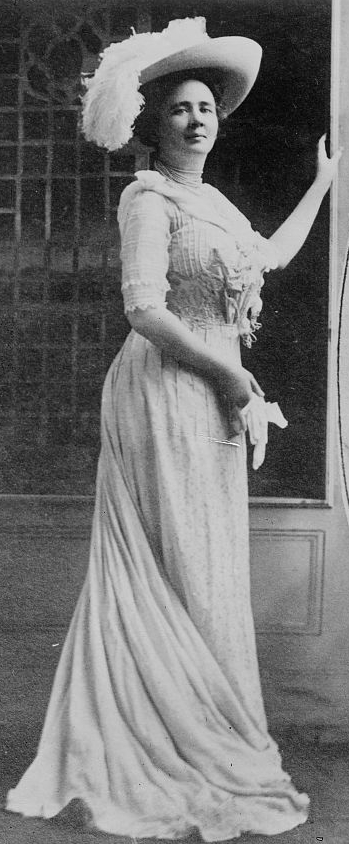
Helen Dortch Longstreet

- April 15 – Ida Freund, Austrian-born chemist and educator (d. 1914)
- April 18 – Count Leopold Berchtold, Austro-Hungarian foreign minister (d. 1942)
- April 20 – Helen Dortch Longstreet, American social advocate, librarian and newspaper woman (d. 1962)
- April 28 – Josiah Thomas, Australian politician (d. 1933)
- April 29
  - William Randolph Hearst, American newspaper publisher (d. 1951)
  - Mary Theresa Ledóchowska, Polish missionary sister (d. 1922)
- May 18 – Ehrhard Schmidt, German admiral (d. 1946)
- May 21 – Archduke Eugen of Austria, Austrian field marshal (d. 1954)
- May 24 – George Grey Barnard, American sculptor (d. 1938)
- May 29 – Arthur Mold, English cricketer (d. 1921)
- June 2 – Felix Weingartner, Austrian conductor (d. 1942)
- June 13 – Lucy, Lady Duff-Gordon, English fashion designer (d. 1942)
- June 17 – Charles Michael, Duke of Mecklenburg, head of the House of Mecklenburg-Strelitz (d. 1934)

=== July–September ===
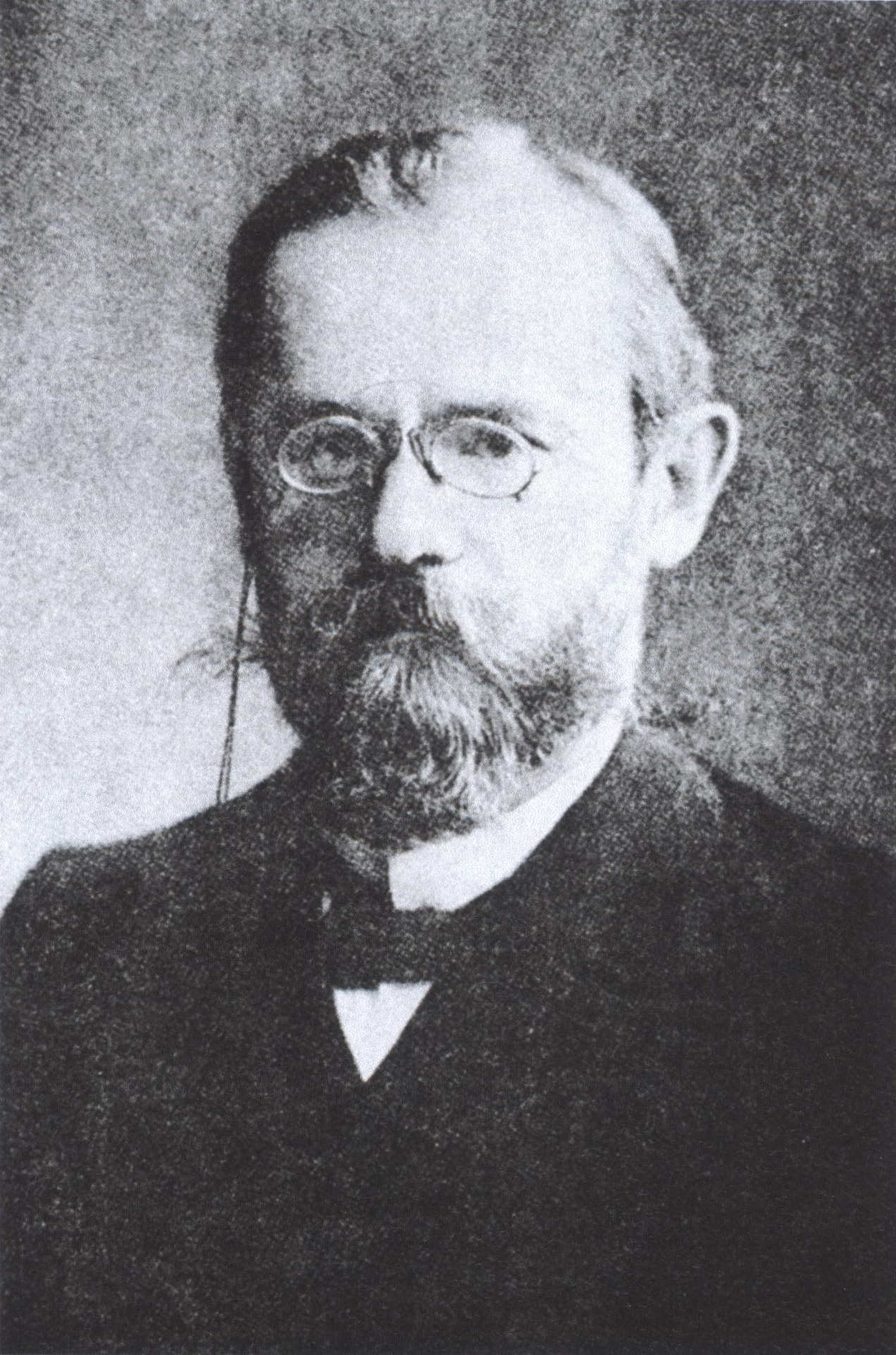
Hugo Winckler

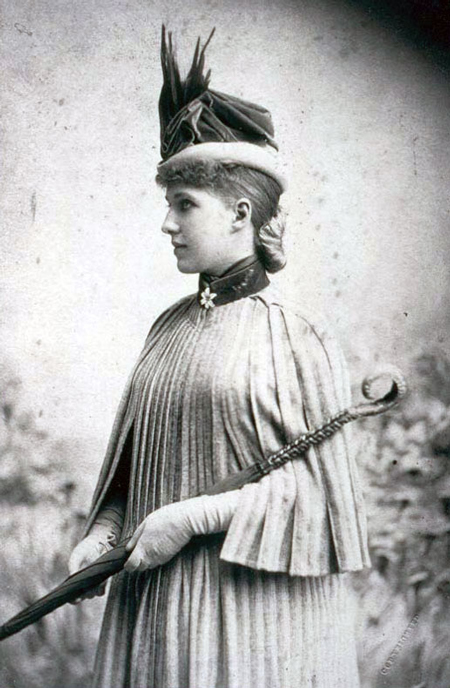
Amélie Rives Troubetzkoy

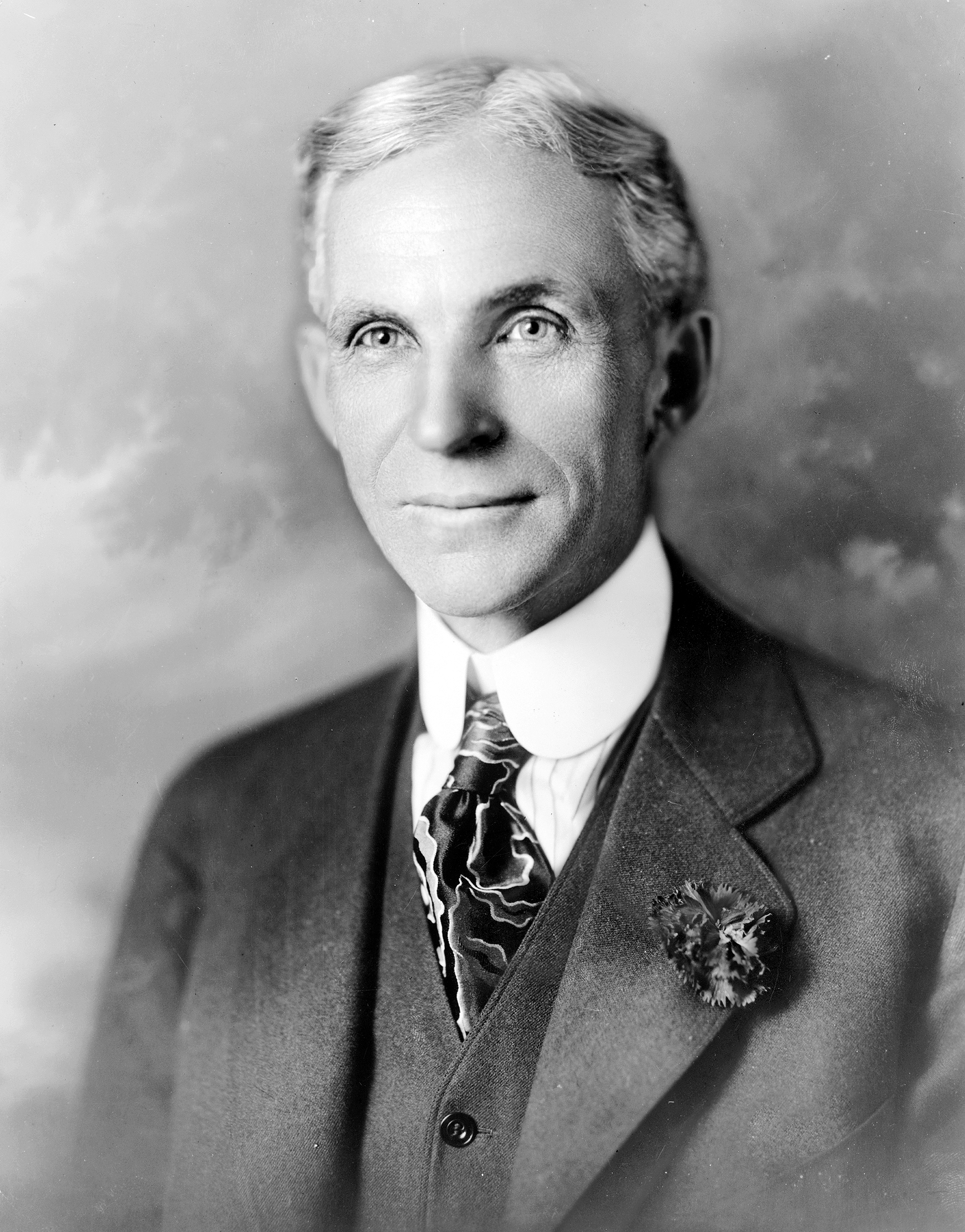
Henry Ford

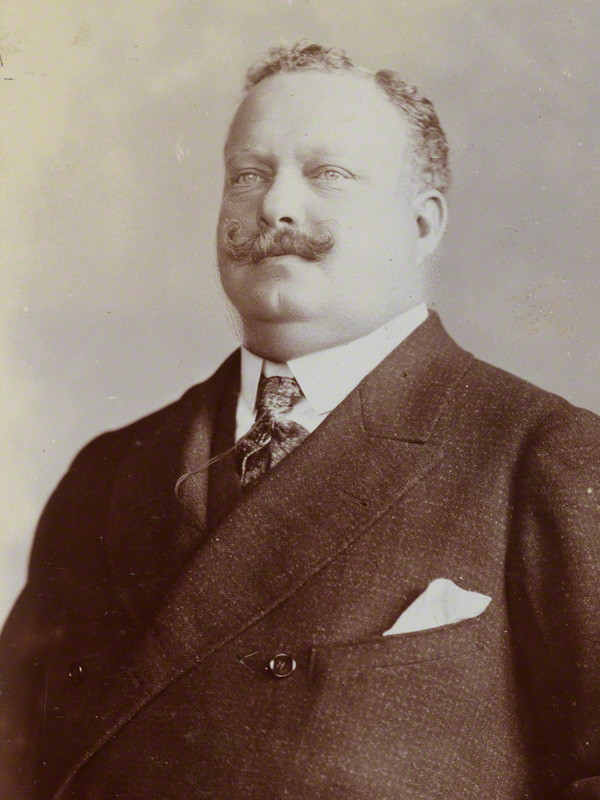
Carlos I of Portugal

- July 1 – William Grant Stairs, Canadian explorer (d. 1892)
- July 4 – Hugo Winckler, German archaeologist and historian, uncovers the capital of the Hittite Empire (Hattusa) (d. 1913)
- July 6 – Reginald McKenna, British Chancellor of the Exchequer (1915–1916) (d. 1943)
- July 15 – Gonzalo Córdova, 21st president of Ecuador (d. 1928)
- July 21 – C. Aubrey Smith, English actor (d. 1948)
- July 25 – Alison Skipworth, English actress (d. 1952)
- July 30 – Henry Ford, American automobile manufacturer, industrialist (d. 1947)
- August 1 – Gaston Doumergue, President of France during the Third Republic (d. 1937)
- August 3 – Géza Gárdonyi, Hungarian author (d. 1922)
- August 15 – Jesse Price, American politician and member of the United States House of Representatives from 1914 to 1919 (d. 1939)
- August 17 – Gene Stratton-Porter, American author, screenwriter and naturalist (d. 1924)
- August 23 – Princess Amélie Rives Troubetzkoy, American author (d. 1945)
- August 24 – Carrie Ashton Johnson, American editor, author (d. 1949)
- August 24 – Dragutin Lerman, Croatian writer, African explorer, East Congo commissioner (d. 1918)
- September 1 – João Pinheiro Chagas, Prime Minister of Portugal (d. 1925)
- September 13
  - Arthur Henderson, Scottish politician, recipient of the Nobel Peace Prize (d. 1935)
  - Franz von Hipper, German admiral (d. 1932)
- September 21
  - John Bunny, American film comedian (d. 1915)
  - Catherine Backus, American sculptor (d. 1955)
- September 22
  - Alexandre Yersin, Swiss-French physician, bacteriologist (d. 1943)
  - G. R. S. Mead, British writer (d. 1933)
- September 25 – S. Isadore Miner, American columnist writing as "Pauline Periwinkle" (d. 1916)
- September 28 – King Carlos I of Portugal (k. 1908)
- September 30 – Reinhard Scheer, German admiral (d. 1928)

=== October–December ===
- October 4 – Samuel P. Bush, American businessman and industrialist (d. 1948)
- October 7 – Clarence Stewart Williams, American admiral (d. 1951)
- October 11
  - Lionel Cripps, Rhodesian politician (d. 1950)
  - Louis Cyr, Canadian strongman (d. 1912)
- October 16 – Austen Chamberlain, English politician, recipient of the Nobel Peace Prize (d. 1937)
- November 8 – Eero Järnefelt, Finnish realist painter (d. 1937)
- November 11 – Paul Signac, French Neo-Impressionist painter (d. 1935)
- November 14 – Leo Baekeland Belgian-born American chemist (d. 1944)
- November 20 – Zeffie Tilbury, English stage, film actress (daughter of Lydia Thompson) (d. 1950)
- November 23 – János Hadik, 19th prime minister of Hungary (d. 1933)
- November 24 – Leberecht Maass, German admiral (d. 1914)
- November 28 – Eremia Grigorescu, Romanian general (d. 1919)
- November 30 – Andrés Bonifacio, Filipino revolutionary leader (d. 1897)
- December 1
  - Qasim Amin, Egyptian writer (d. 1908)
  - Black Elk/ Heȟáka Sápa', Oglala Teton Lakota (Western Sioux) medicine/holy man (d. 1950)
- December 5 – Paul Painlevé, mathematician and 2-time prime minister of France (d. 1933)
- December 7
  - Felix Calonder, Swiss politician (d. 1952)
  - Richard Warren Sears, American businessman (d. 1914)
  - Pietro Mascagni, Italian composer (d. 1945)
- December 8 – Albert Abrams, American doctor (d. 1924)
- December 11
  - Georg Bruchmüller, German artillery officer (d. 1948)
  - Annie Jump Cannon, American astronomer (d. 1941)

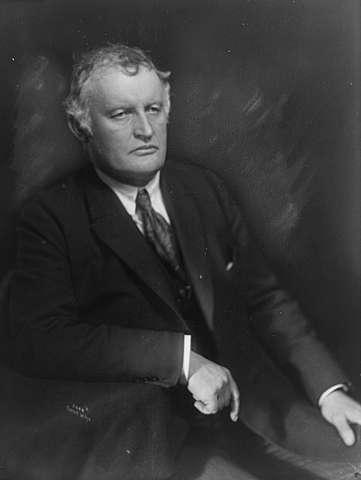
Edvard Munch

- December 12
  - Edvard Munch, Norwegian painter (d. 1944)
  - Sahibzada Abdul Qayyum, British India politician, educationist (d. 1937)
- December 13 – Harry Todd, American actor (d. 1935)
- December 14 – Kenneth Balfour, British Conservative Party politician (d. 1936)
- December 16 – George Santayana, Spanish-born philosopher, poet, essayist and novelist (d. 1952)
- December 18 – Archduke Franz Ferdinand of Austria (k. 1914)

1864

=== January–March ===
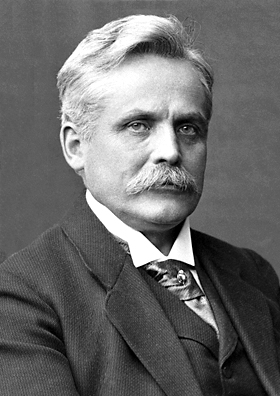
Wilhelm Wien

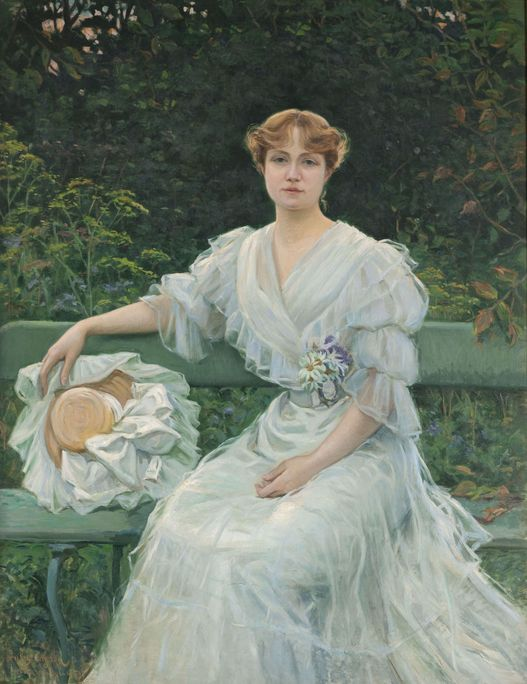
Marguerite Durand

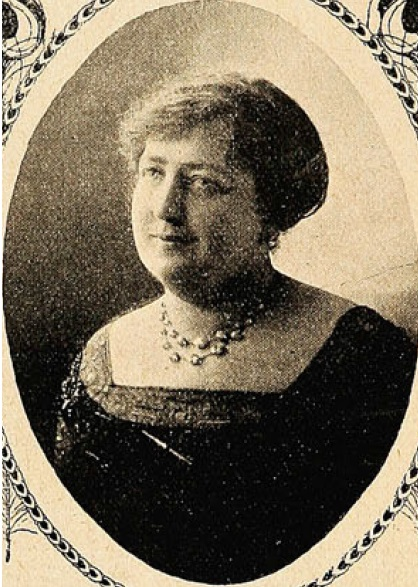
Ana Echazarreta

- January 1
  - Qi Baishi, Chinese painter (d. 1957)
  - Alfred Stieglitz, American photographer (d. 1946)
- January 8 – Prince Albert Victor, Duke of Clarence and Avondale (d. 1892)
- January 13 – Wilhelm Wien, German physicist, Nobel Prize laureate (d. 1928)
- January 21 – Israel Zangwill, British novelist, playwright (d. 1926)
- January 24 – Marguerite Durand, French actress, journalist and feminist leader (d. 1936)
- January 28 – Herbert Akroyd Stuart, English mechanical engineer, inventor (d. 1927)
- February 4 – James Fenton, Australian politician (d. 1950)
- February 7 – Arthur Collins, early American recording artist (d. 1933)
- February 11 – Louis Bouveault, French chemist (d. 1909)
- February 14 – Hadley Williams, Canadian surgeon and educator (d. 1932)
- February 17 – Banjo Paterson, Australian poet (d. 1941)
- February 20 – Henry Rawlinson, 1st Baron Rawlinson, British general (d. 1925)
- March 4 – David W. Taylor, American naval architect (d. 1940)
- March 12 – W. H. R. Rivers, English psychiatrist (d. 1922)
- March 13 – Alexej von Jawlensky, Russian expressionist painter (d. 1941)
- March 14 – Casey Jones, American railway engineer (d. 1900)
- March 14 – Alfred Redl, Austrian military intelligence officer and double agent (suicide 1913)
- March 15 – Johan Halvorsen, Norwegian composer (d. 1935)
- March 17 – Joseph Baptista, Indian Home Rule Movement founder (d. 1930)
- March 19 – Charles Marion Russell, American artist (d. 1926)
- March 23
  - Robert Arbuthnot, British admiral (d. 1916)
  - Sándor Simonyi-Semadam, 26th Prime Minister of Hungary (d. 1946)

=== April–June ===
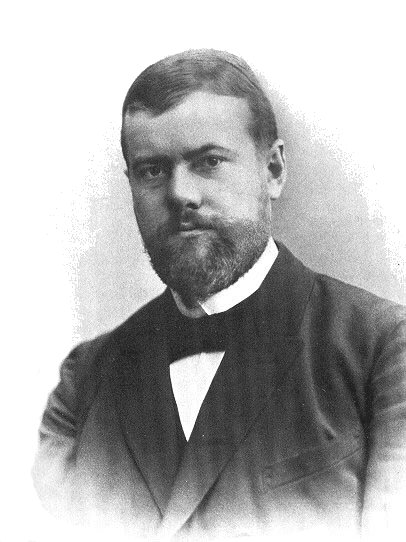
Max Weber

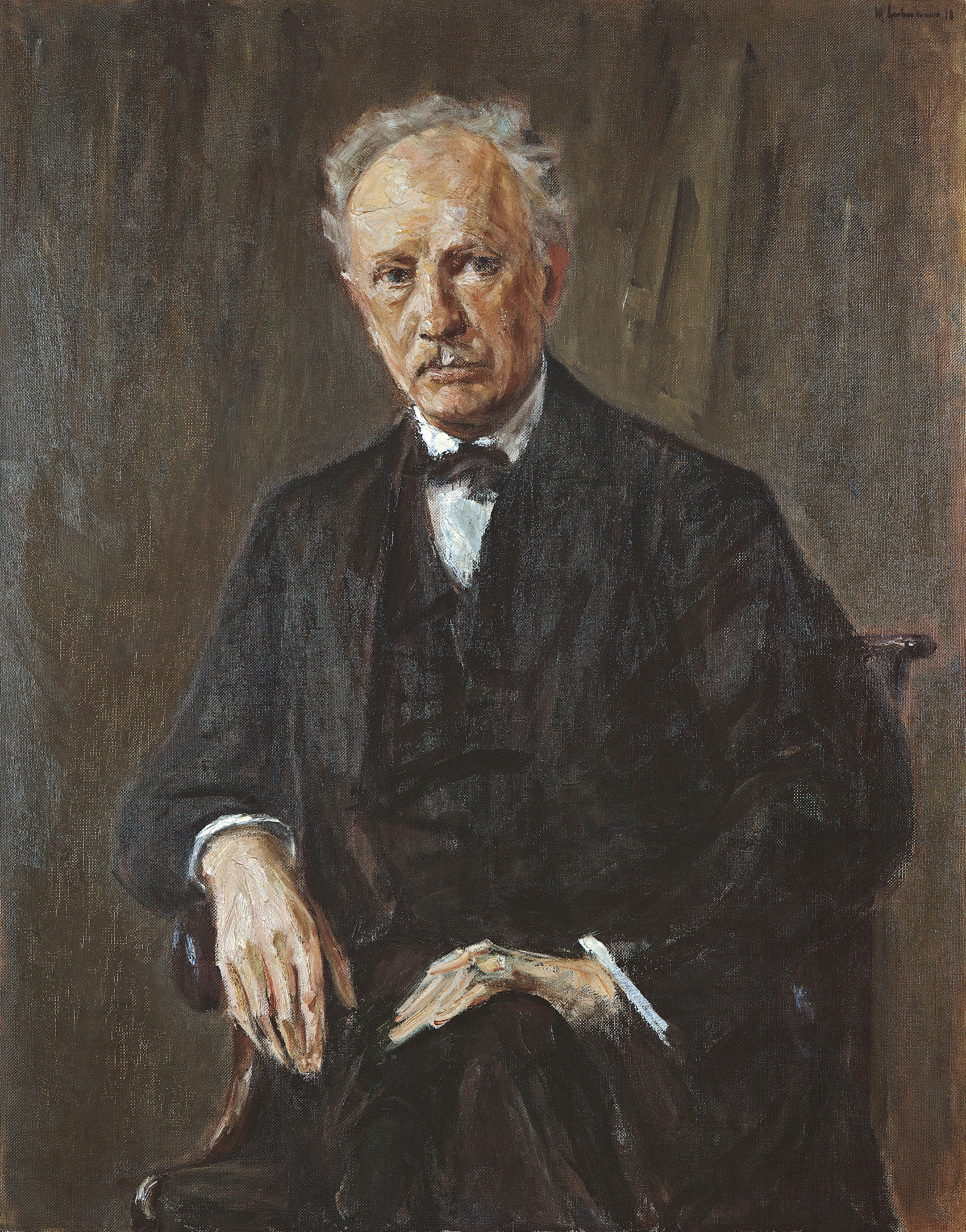
Richard Strauss, 1918

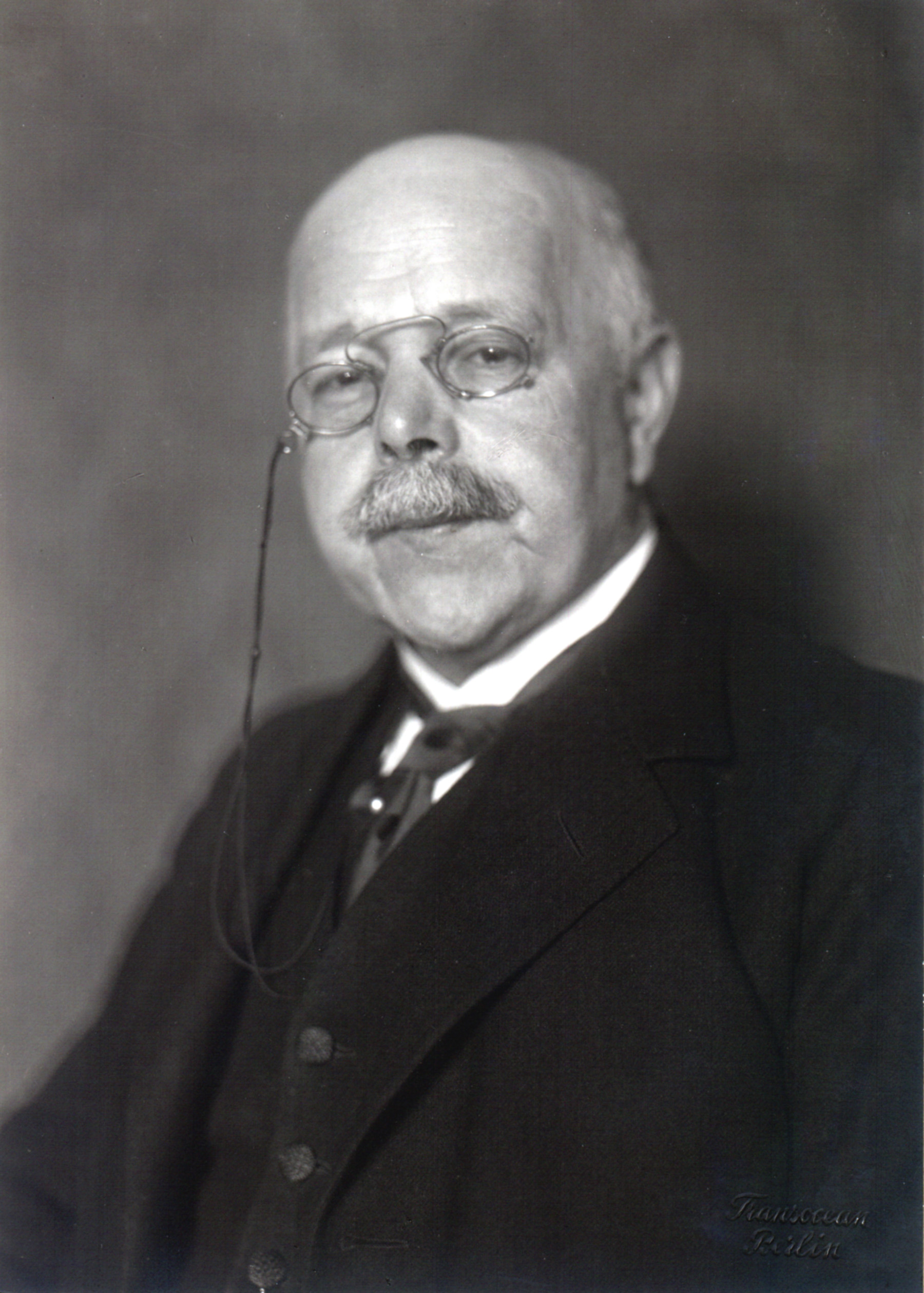
Walther Nernst

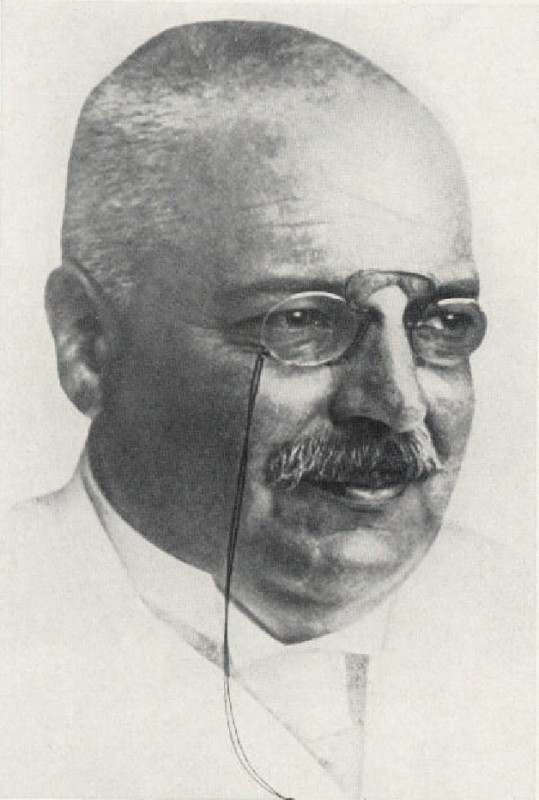
Alois Alzheimer

- April 10
  - Clara Lachmann, Danish-Swedish patron of the arts (d. 1920)
  - Michael Mayr, 2nd Chancellor of Austria (d. 1922)
  - Tully Marshall, American actor (d. 1943)
- April 11 – Johanna Elberskirchen, German feminist (d. 1943)
- April 12 – Rosslyn Wemyss, 1st Baron Wester Wemyss, British admiral (d. 1933)
- April 14 – Artur Văitoianu, Romanian general and politician, 27th Prime Minister of Romania (d. 1956)
- April 21 – Max Weber, German sociologist (d. 1920)
- May 5 – Sir Henry Wilson, 1st Baronet, British field marshal, politician (d. 1922)
- May 10 – Léon Gaumont, French film pioneer (d. 1946)
- May 15 – Vilhelm Hammershøi, Danish painter (d. 1916)
- May 20 – Vasily Gurko, Russian general (d. 1937)
- May 25 – Princess Anne of Löwenstein-Wertheim-Freudenberg, British-born German aristocrat, aviation enthusiast (d. 1927, officially declared dead February 1928)
- June 2 – Wilhelm Souchon, German admiral (d. 1946)
- June 3 – Ransom E. Olds, American automotive pioneer (d. 1950)
- June 10 – Ninian Comper, British architect (d. 1960)
- June 11 – Richard Strauss, German composer (d. 1949)
- June 13 – Dwight B. Waldo, American educator, historian (d. 1939)
- June 14 – Alois Alzheimer, German psychiatrist, neuropathologist (d. 1915)
- June 22 – Hermann Minkowski, German mathematician (d. 1909)
- June 25 – Walther Nernst, German chemist, Nobel Prize laureate (d. 1941)
- June 30 – Frederick Bligh Bond, English architect (d. 1945)

=== July–September ===
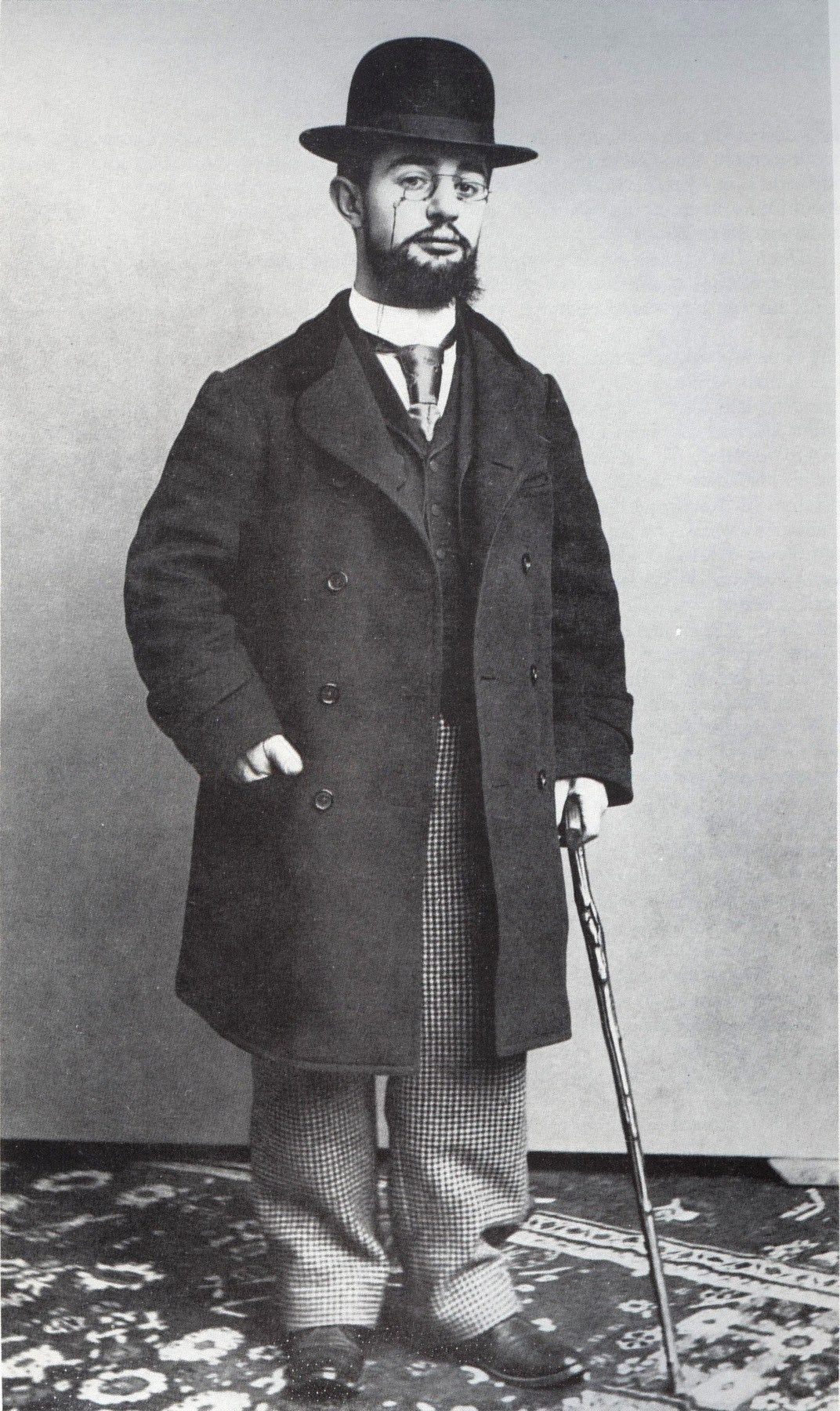
Henri de Toulouse-Lautrec

- July 12
  - George Washington Carver, African-American botanist (d. 1943)
  - Peter Deunov, Bulgarian spiritual teacher (d. 1944)
- July 13 – John Jacob Astor IV, American businessman, inventor (d. 1912)
- July 15 – Marie Tempest, English stage, film actress (d. 1942)
- July 20 – Erik Axel Karlfeldt, Swedish writer, Nobel Prize laureate (d. 1931)
- July 21 – Frances Cleveland, First Lady of the United States (d. 1947)
- July 23 – Apolinario Mabini, Filipino political theoretician, Prime Minister (d. 1903)
- August 9 – Roman Dmowski, Polish politician (d. 1939)
- August 20 – Ion I. C. Brătianu, 5-time prime minister of Romania (d. 1927)
- August 23 – Eleftherios Venizelos, 7-time prime minister of Greece (d. 1936)
- September 14 – Robert Cecil, 1st Viscount Cecil of Chelwood, English politician, diplomat, recipient of the Nobel Peace Prize (d. 1958)

=== October–December ===
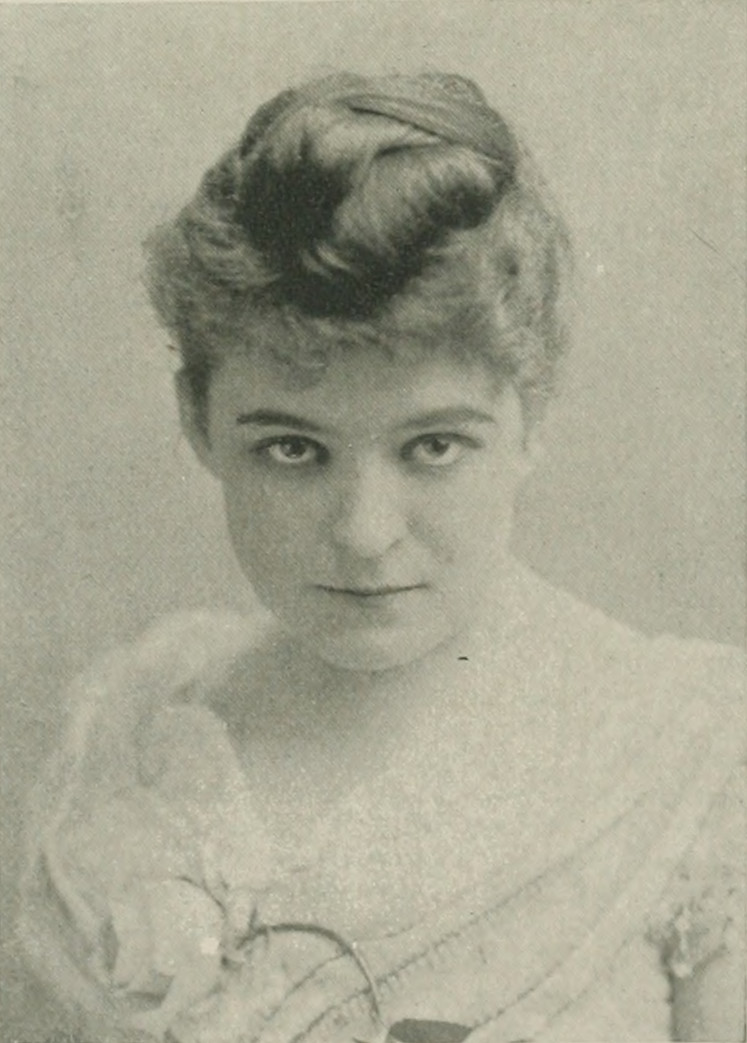
Emma Sheridan Fry

- October 1 – Emma Sheridan Fry, American actress and playwright (d. 1936)
- October 3 – Sentō Takenaka, Japanese admiral (d. 1919)
- October 5 – Louis Lumière, French inventor (d. 1948)
- October 8
  - Kikunae Ikeda, Japanese chemist (d. 1936)
  - Aleksander Meysztowicz, Polish politician and landowner (died 1943)
- October 9 – Reginald Dyer, British army officer, perpetrator of Jallianwala Bagh massacre (d. 1927)
- October 15 – Lorenzo Lauri, Italian cardinal (d. 1941)
- October 25 – Alexander Gretchaninov, Russian composer (d. 1956)
- October 31 – Cosmo Gordon Lang, Archbishop of Canterbury (d. 1945)
- November 5 – Jessie Ralph, American actress (d. 1944)
- November 1 – Princess Elisabeth of Hesse and by Rhine (d. 1918)
- November 11 – Alfred Hermann Fried, Austrian writer, pacifist, recipient of the Nobel Peace Prize (d. 1921)
- November 24 – Henri de Toulouse-Lautrec, French painter (d. 1901)
- November 26 – Edward Higgins, third General of The Salvation Army (d. 1947)
- November 27 – Alfred Meyer-Waldeck, German admiral (d. 1928)
- December 6
  - Alberico Albricci, Italian general (d. 1936)
  - William S. Hart, American film actor, director and writer (d. 1946)
- December 8 – Camille Claudel, French sculptor (d. 1943)
- December 9 – Breaker Morant, Australian soldier (d. 1902)
- December 12 – Paul Elmer More, American critic, essayist (d. 1937)
- December 14 – Frank Campeau, American actor (d. 1943)
- December 23 – Princess Zorka of Montenegro (d. 1890)
- December 25 – Thomas Cahill, American soccer coach (d. 1951)
- December 27 – Peyton C. March, U.S. Army general (d. 1955)

=== Date unknown ===
- Ali Rikabi, 2-time prime minister of Jordan (d. 1943)

1865

=== January–February ===
- January 5 – Julio Garavito Armero, Colombian astronomer (d. 1920)
- January 9 – Leo Ditrichstein, Austrian-born stage actor, playwright (d. 1928)
- January 19 – Valentin Serov, Russian portrait painter (d. 1911)
- January 20 – Yvette Guilbert, French cabaret singer, actress (d. 1944)
- January 27 – Nikolai Pokrovsky, Russian politician, last foreign minister of the Russian Empire (d. 1930)
- January 28
  - Lala Lajpat Rai ("The Lion of Punjab"), a leader of the Indian independence movement (d. 1928)
  - Kaarlo Juho Ståhlberg, 1st President of Finland (d. 1952)
- January 31 – Henri Desgrange, French cycling enthusiast, founder of the Tour de France (d. 1940)
- February 4 – Ernest Hanbury Hankin, English bacteriologist, naturalist (d. 1939)
- February 9 – Beatrice Stella Tanner, later Mrs. Patrick Campbell, English theatre actress, producer (d. 1940)
- February 12
  - Enrico Millo, Italian admiral and politician (d. 1930)
  - Kazimierz Tetmajer, Polish writer (d. 1940)
- February 17 – Ernst Troeltsch, German theologian (d. 1923).
- February 19 – Sven Hedin, Swedish scientist, explorer (d. 1952)
- February 21 – John Haden Badley, English author, educator (d. 1967)
- February 28 – Wilfred Grenfell, English medical missionary to Newfoundland and Labrador (d. 1940)

=== March–April ===
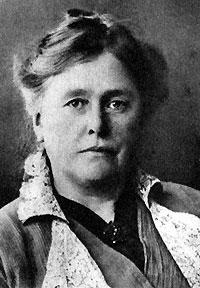
Elma Danielsson

- March 1 – Elma Danielsson, Swedish socialist, journalist (d. 1936)
- March 10 – Tan Sitong, Chinese reformist leader (d. 1898)
- March 15 – Sui Sin Far, English-born writer (d. 1914)
- March 18 – Carl Erik Johan Mannerheim, Finnish nobleman and banker (d. 1915)
- March 19 – William Morton Wheeler, American entomologist (d. 1937)
- March 30 – Heinrich Rubens, German physicist (d. 1922)
- April – Richard Rushall, British sea captain and businessman (d. 1953)
- April 1 – Richard Adolf Zsigmondy, Austrian-born chemist, Nobel Prize laureate (d. 1929)
- April 2 – Gyorche Petrov, Macedonian and Bulgarian revolutionary (d. 1921)
- April 6 – Victory Bateman, American stage and screen actress (d. 1926)
- April 9
  - Violet Nicolson, English poet (d. 1904)
  - Erich Ludendorff, German general (d. 1937)
  - Charles Proteus Steinmetz, German-American engineer, electrician (d. 1923)
- April 14 – Alfred Hoare Powell, English Arts and Crafts architect, and designer and painter of pottery (d. 1960)
- April 16 – Harry Chauvel, Australian Army general (d. 1945)
- April 18 – Leónidas Plaza, 16th President of Ecuador (d. 1932)
- April 19 – Josephine Hall, American actress and soprano (d. 1920)
- April 26 – Akseli Gallen-Kallela, Finnish artist (d. 1931)
- April 28
  - Vital Brazil, Brazilian physician, immunologist (d. 1950)
  - Charles W. Woodworth, American entomologist (d. 1940)

=== May–June ===
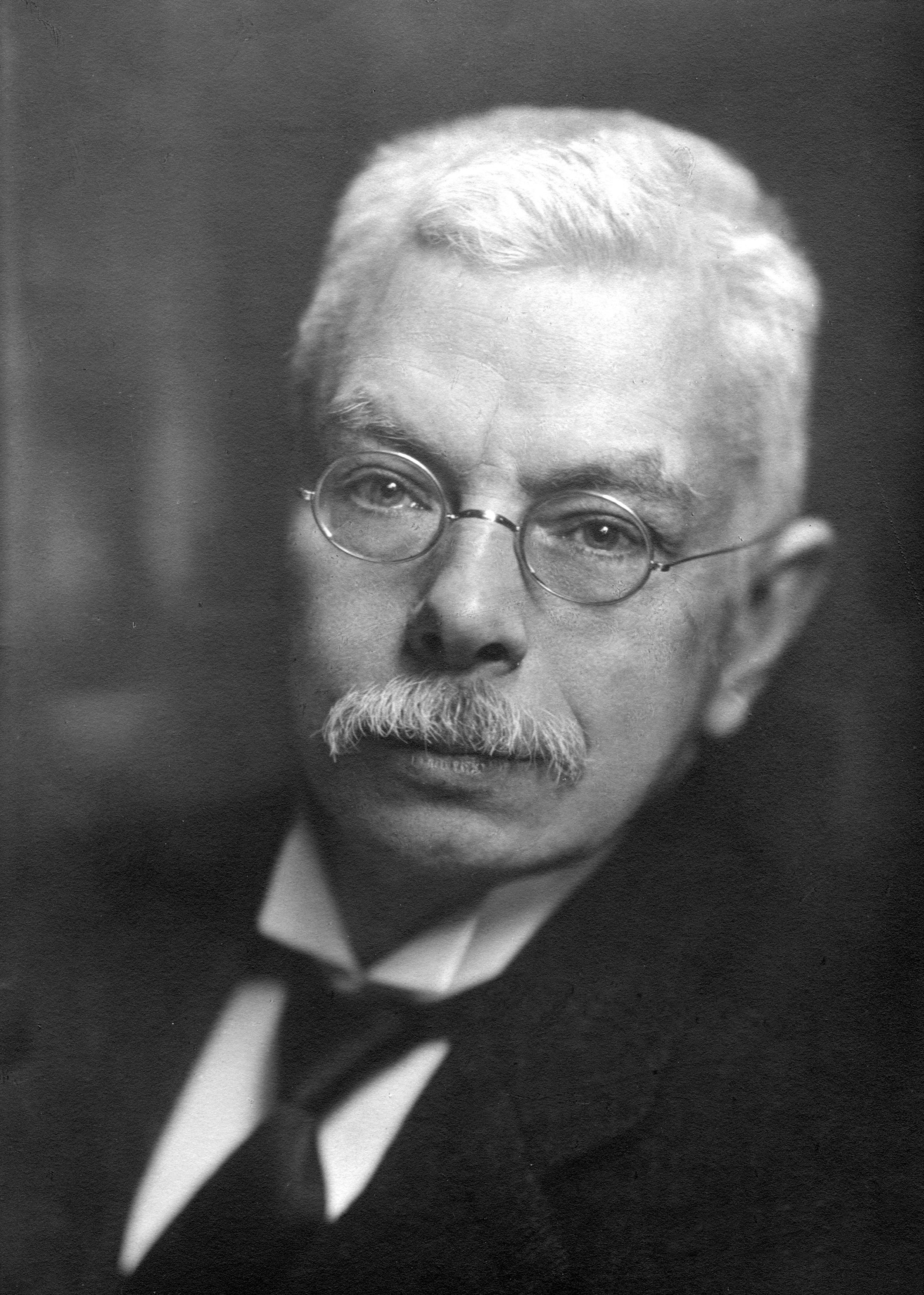
Pieter Zeeman

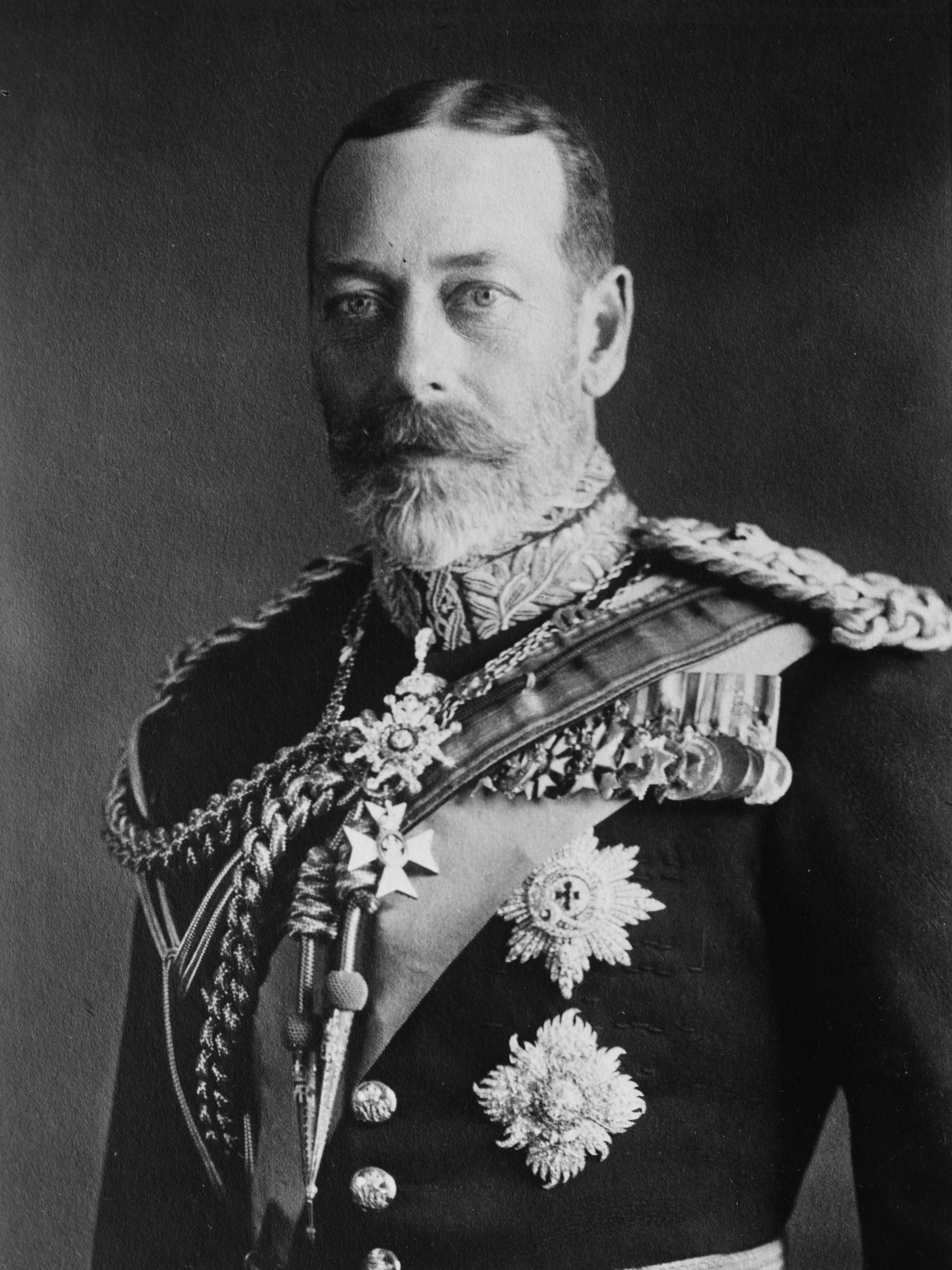
King George V of the United Kingdom

- May 2 – Clyde Fitch, American dramatist (d. 1909)
- May 3 – Martha M. Simpson, Australian educationalist (d. 1948)
- May 23 – Epitácio Pessoa, 11th President of Brazil (d. 1942)
- May 25
  - John Mott, American YMCA leader, recipient of the Nobel Peace Prize (d. 1955)
  - Pieter Zeeman, Dutch physicist, Nobel Prize laureate (d. 1943)
- May 26 – Robert W. Chambers, American artist (d. 1933)
- June 2 – George Lohmann, English cricketer (d. 1901)
- June 3 – George V of the United Kingdom (d. 1936)
- June 9
  - Albéric Magnard, French composer (d. 1914)
  - Carl Nielsen, Danish composer (d. 1931)
- June 13 – W. B. Yeats, Irish writer, Nobel Prize laureate (d. 1939)
- June 19
  - Alfred Hugenberg, German businessman, politician (d. 1951)
  - May Whitty, British stage and screen actress (d. 1948)
- June 21 – Otto Frank, German physiologist (d. 1944)
- June 26 – Bernard Berenson, American art historian (d. 1959)
- June 27 – John Monash, Australian general (d. 1931)
- June 29 – Shigechiyo Izumi, Japanese supercentenarian (d. 1986)

=== July–August ===
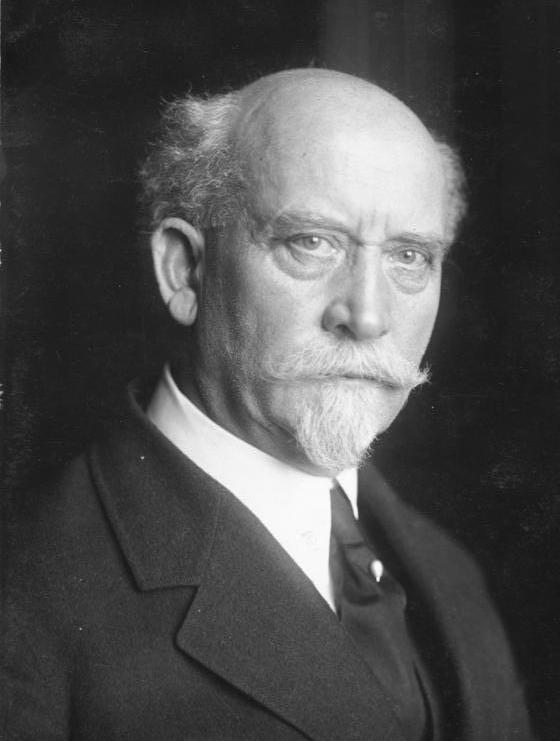
Philipp Scheidemann

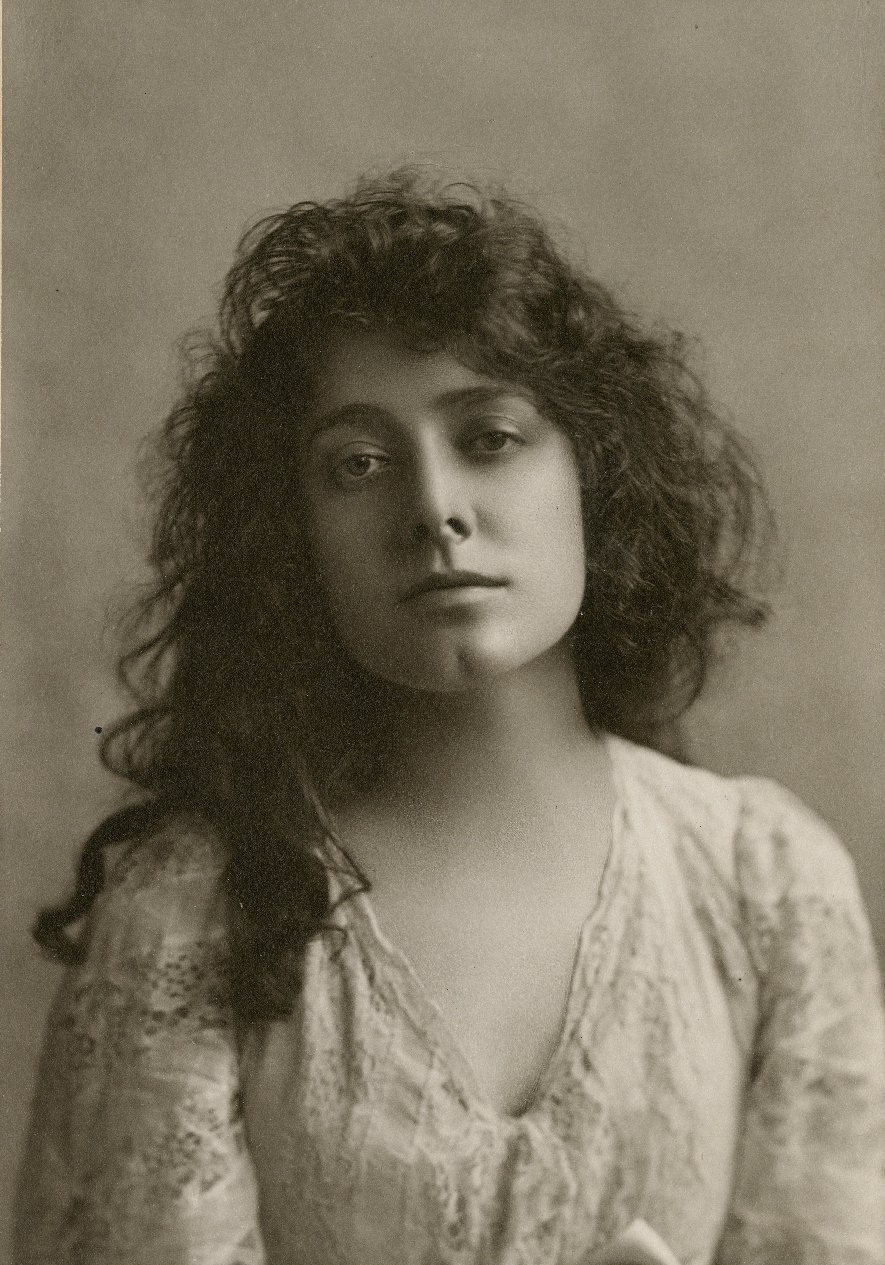
Julia Marlowe

- July 1 – Granville Ryrie, Australian Army general, politician, and diplomat (d. 1937)
- July 13 – Gérard Encausse, French occultist (d. 1916)
- July 15 – Alfred Harmsworth, 1st Viscount Northcliffe, Irish-born British publisher; founder of the Daily Mail and Daily Mirror (d.1922)
- July 23
  - Max Heindel, Danish-born Christian occultist, astrologer, and mystic (d. 1919)
  - Edward Terry Sanford, Associate Justice of the Supreme Court of the United States (d. 1930)
- July 26 – Philipp Scheidemann, 11th Chancellor of Germany (d. 1939)
- August 2
  - Irving Babbitt, American literary critic (d. 1933)
  - John Radecki, Australian stained glass artist (d. 1955)
- August 10 – Alexander Glazunov, Russian composer (d. 1936)
- August 15 – Usui Mikao, Japanese founder of reiki (d. 1926)
- August 17 – Julia Marlowe, English-born American stage actress (d. 1950)
- August 20 – Bernard Tancred, South African cricketer (d. 1911)
- August 22 – Templar Saxe, British actor and singer (d. 1935)
- August 24 – King Ferdinand I of Romania (d. 1927)
- August 27 – James Henry Breasted, American Egyptologist (d. 1935)

=== September–October ===
- September 4 – Maria Karłowska, Polish Roman Catholic religious professed and blessed (d. 1935)
- September 11 – Rainis, Latvian poet, playwright (d. 1929)
- September 13 – William Birdwood, 1st Baron Birdwood, British field marshal (d. 1951)
- September 26 – Mary Russell, Duchess of Bedford, English aviator, ornithologist (d. 1937)

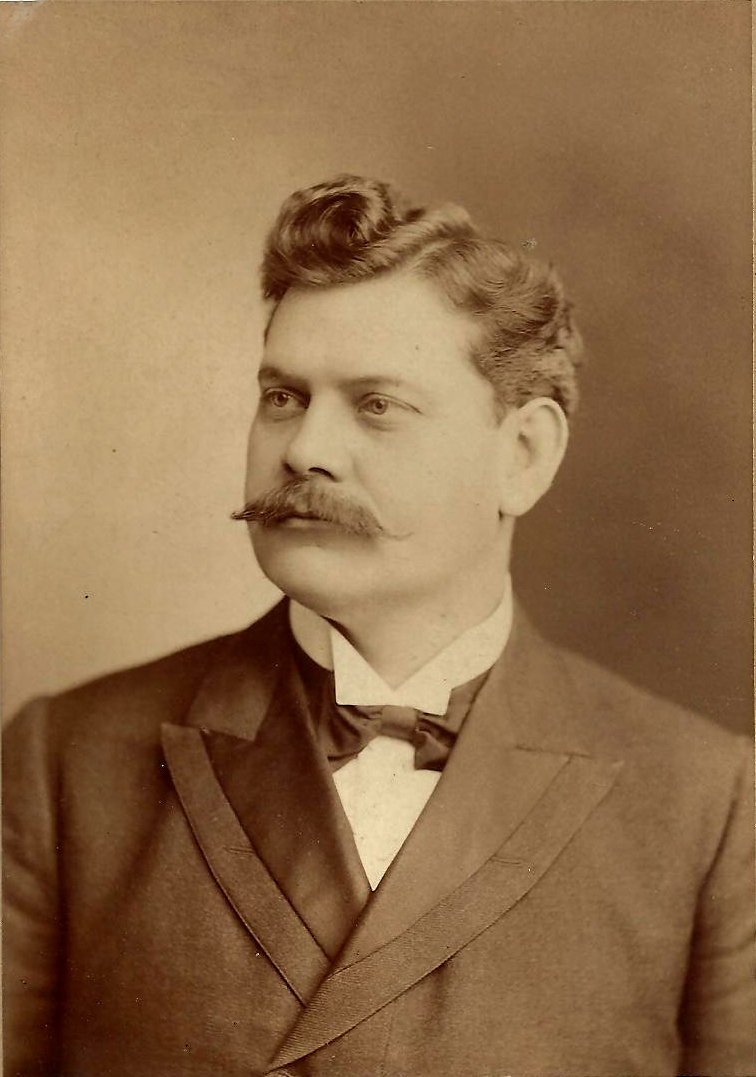
Charles W. Clark

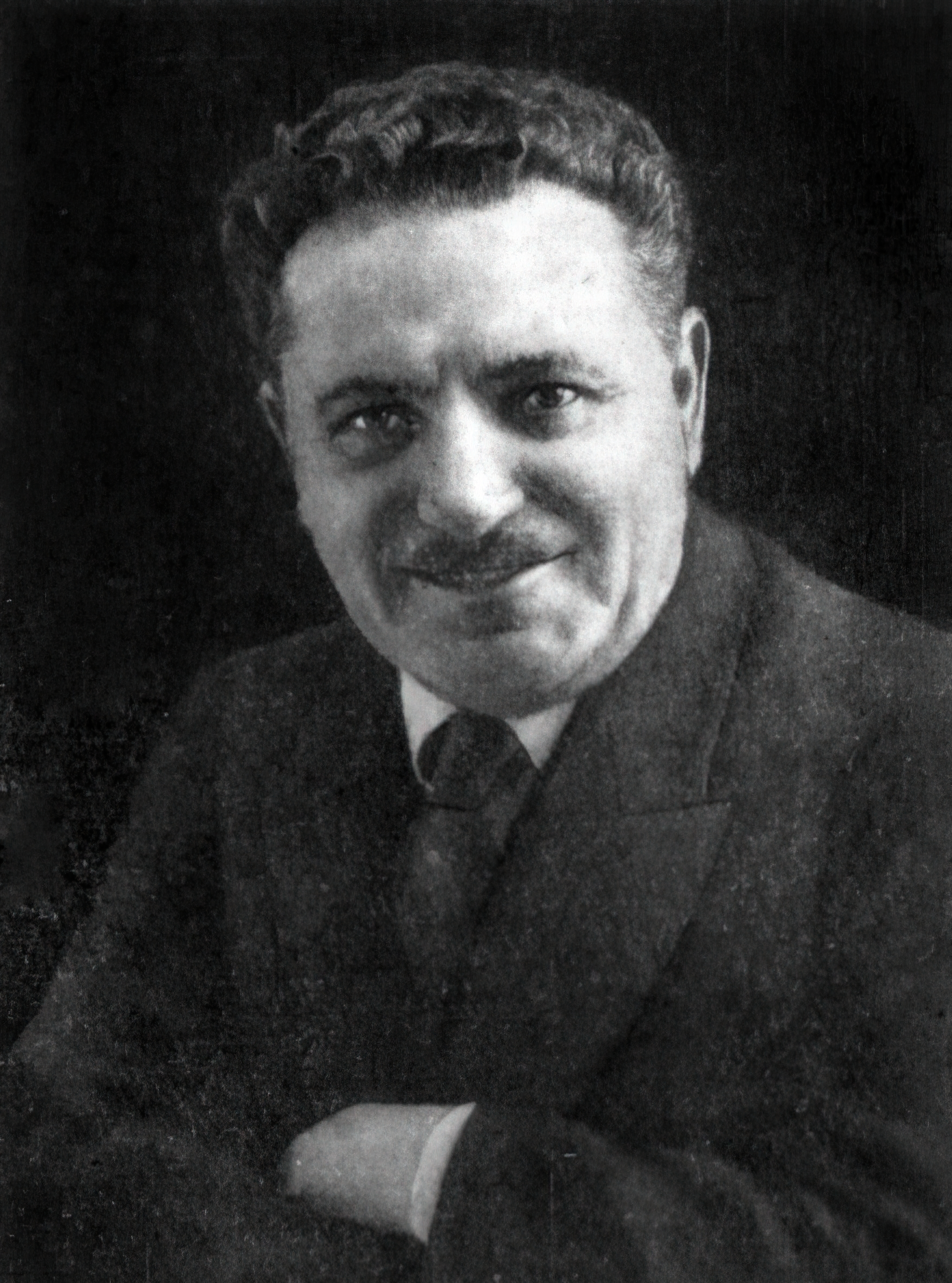
Hovhannes Abelian

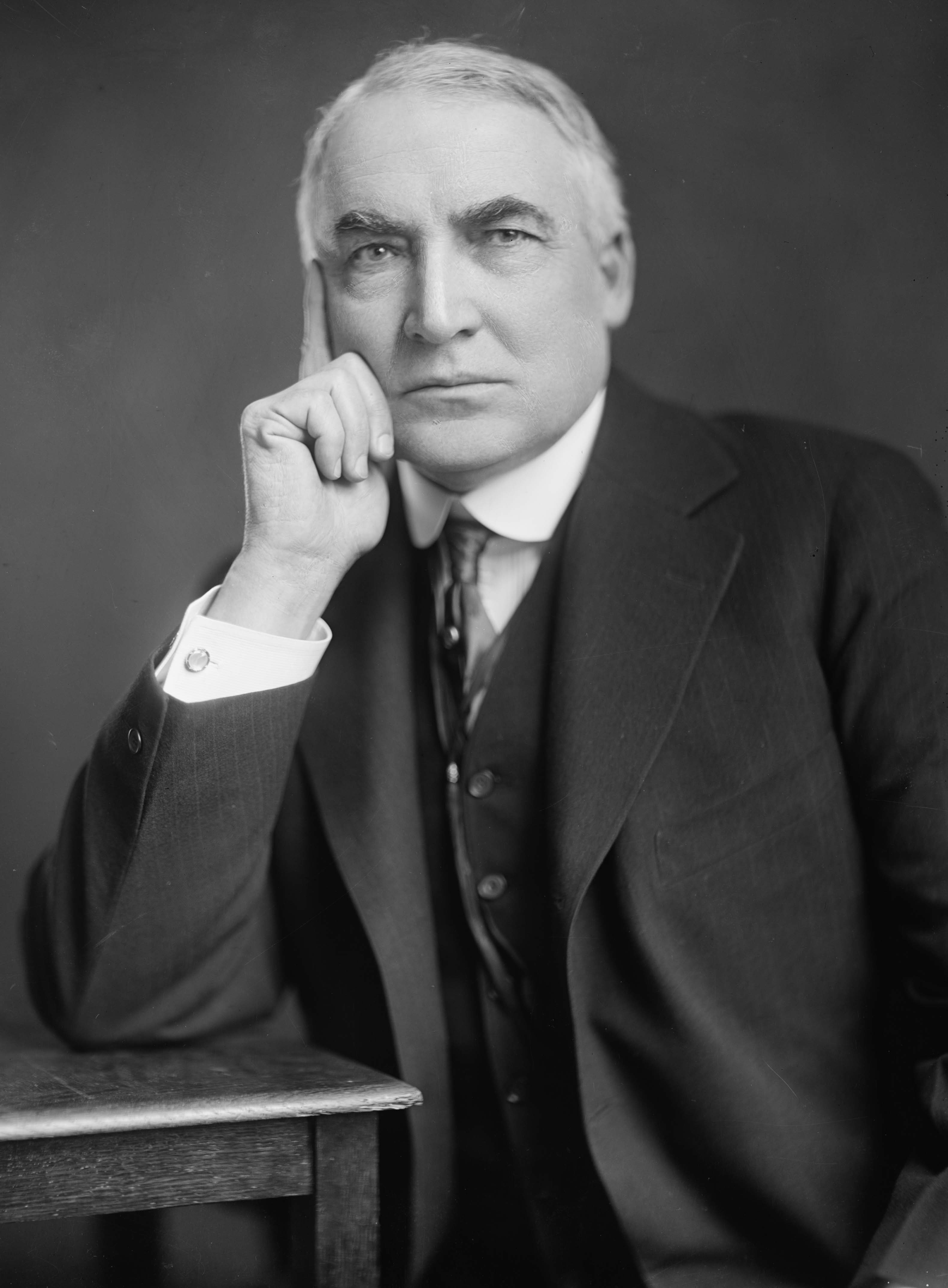
Warren G. Harding

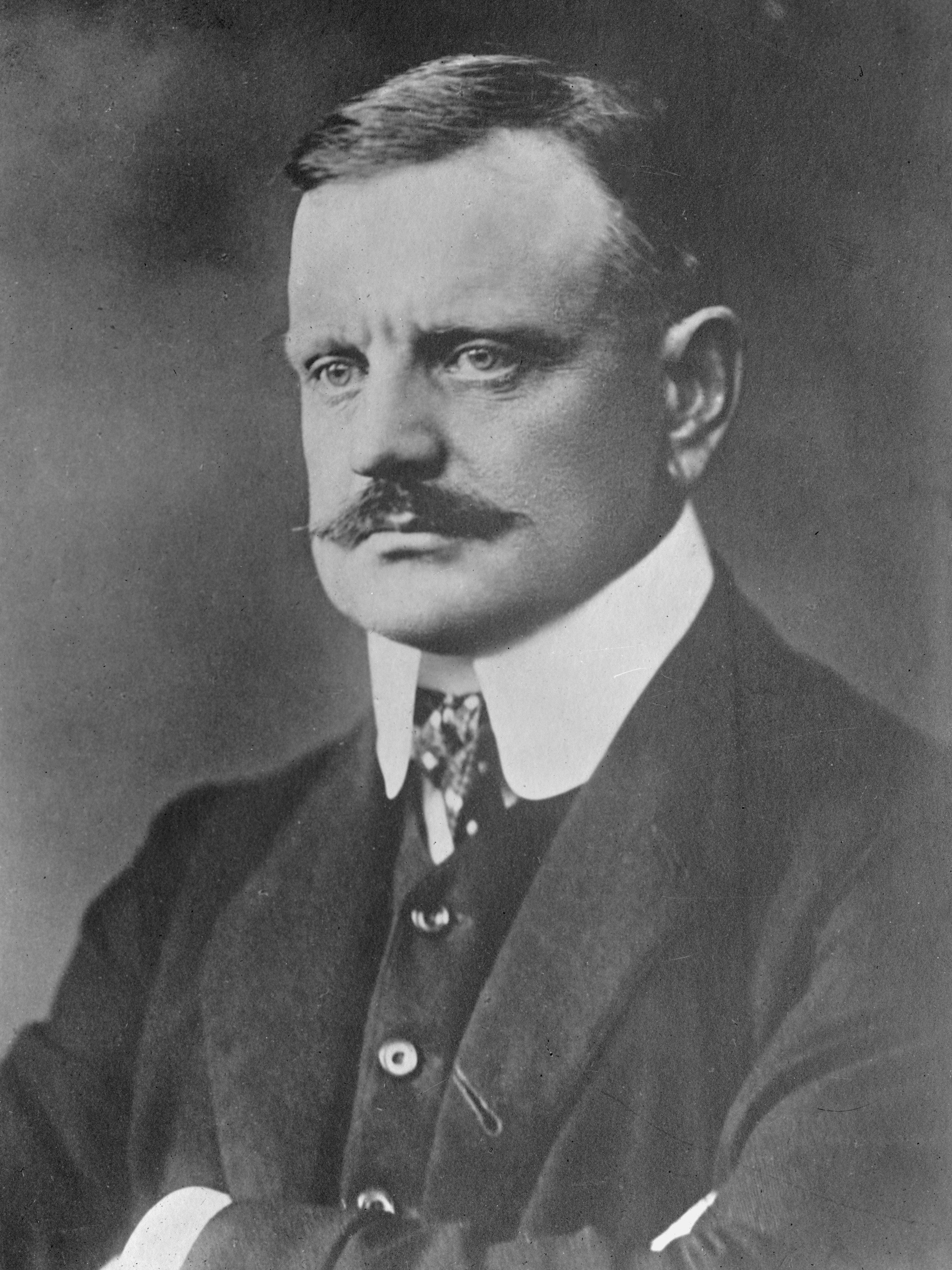
Jean Sibelius

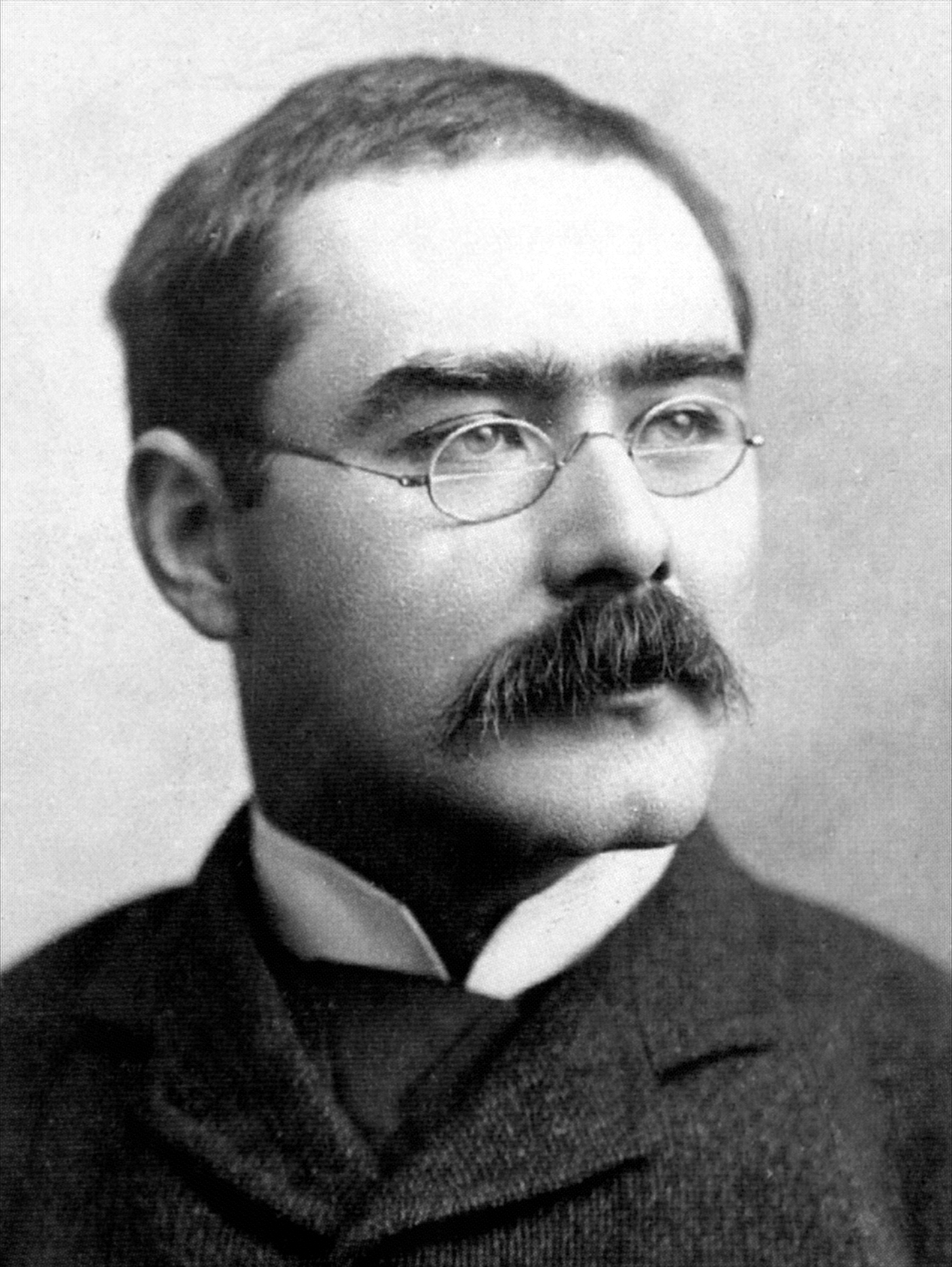
Rudyard Kipling

- October 1 – Paul Dukas, French composer (d. 1935)
- October 9 – Arthur Hayes-Sadler, British admiral (d. 1952)
- October 10 – Rafael Merry del Val, Spanish Roman Catholic Cardinal and Secretary of the Congregation of the Holy Office (d. 1930)
- October 12 – Arthur Harden, English chemist, Nobel Prize laureate (d. 1940)
- October 15 – Charles W. Clark, American baritone (d. 1925)
- October 16 – Rudolph Lambart, 10th Earl of Cavan, British field marshal (d. 1946)
- October 17 – James Rudolph Garfield, U.S. politician (d. 1950)
- October 22
  - Charles James Briggs, British general (d. 1941)
  - Raymond Hitchcock, American actor (d. 1929)
- October 23 – Hovhannes Abelian, Armenian actor (d. 1936)
- October 26 – Benjamin Guggenheim, American businessman (d. 1912)
- October 27 – Tinsley Lindley, English footballer (d. 1940)

=== November–December ===
- November 2 – Warren G. Harding, 29th President of the United States (d. 1923)
- November 11 – Edwin Thanhouser, American actor, businessman, and film producer, founder of the Thanhouser Company (d. 1956)
- December 8
  - Rüdiger von der Goltz, German general (d. 1946)
  - Jean Sibelius, Finnish composer (d. 1957)
- December 12 – Edwyn Alexander-Sinclair, British admiral (d. 1945)
- December 16 – Olavo Bilac, Brazilian poet (d. 1918)
- December 19 – Minnie Maddern Fiske, American stage actress (d. 1932)
- December 20 – Elsie de Wolfe, American socialite, interior decorator (d. 1950)
- December 23
  - Anna Farquhar Bergengren, American author and editor (unknown year of death)
  - James M. Canty, American educator, school administrator, and businessperson (d. 1964)
  - Albrecht, Duke of Württemberg, German field marshal (d. 1939)
- December 25
  - Evangeline Booth, 4th General of The Salvation Army (d. 1950)
  - Fay Templeton, American musical comedy star (d. 1939)
- December 28 – Félix Vallotton, Swiss painter, printmaker (d. 1925)
- December 29 – Otis Harlan, American actor and comedian (d. 1940)
- December 30 – Rudyard Kipling, Indian-born English writer, Nobel Prize laureate (d. 1936)

=== Date unknown ===
- Ernest Hogan, African-American dancer, musician, and comedian (d. 1909)
- Habibullah Qurayshi, Bengali Islamic scholar and educationist (d. 1943)

1866

=== January–March ===
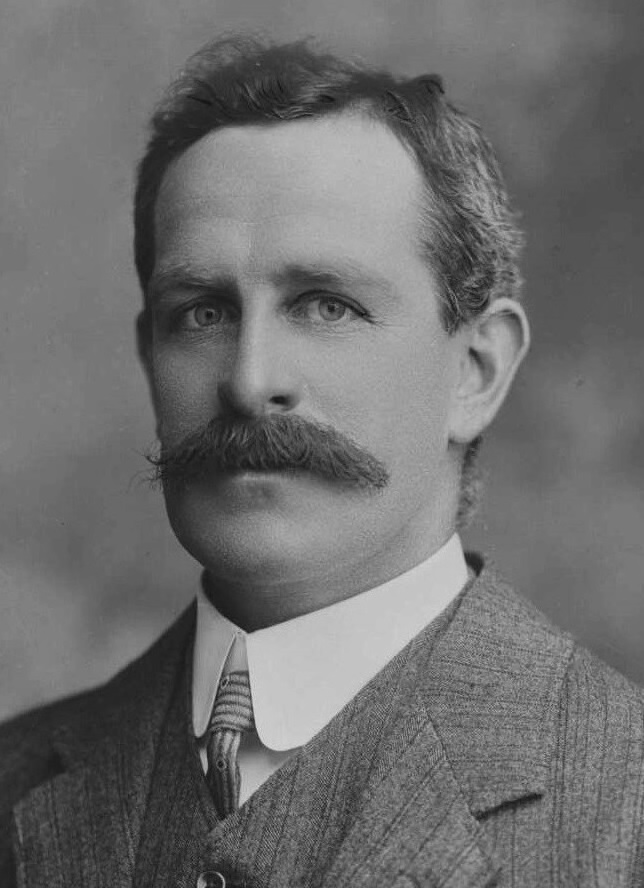
Frank Tudor

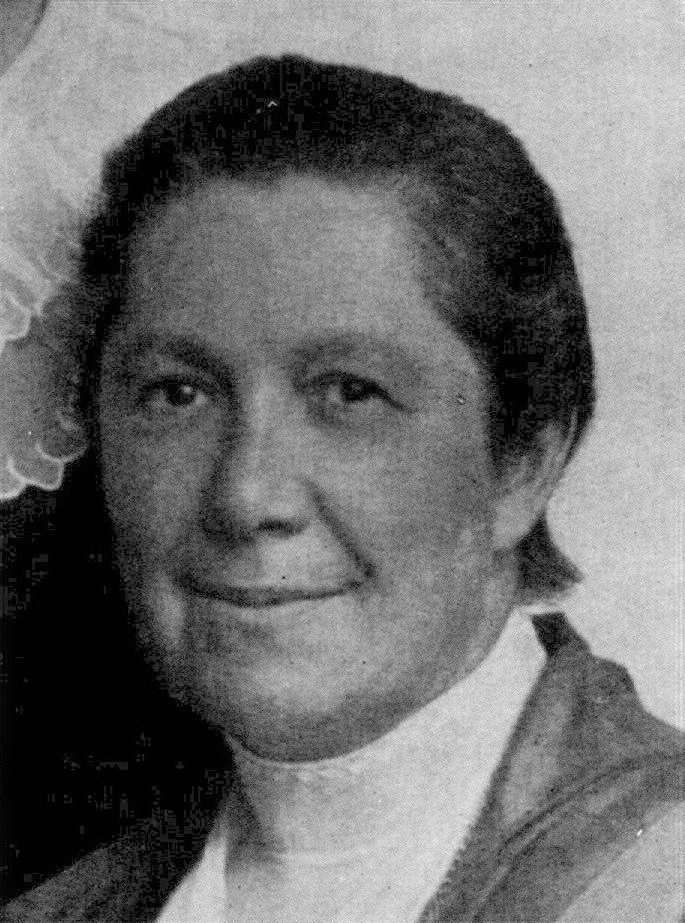
Emilia Broomé

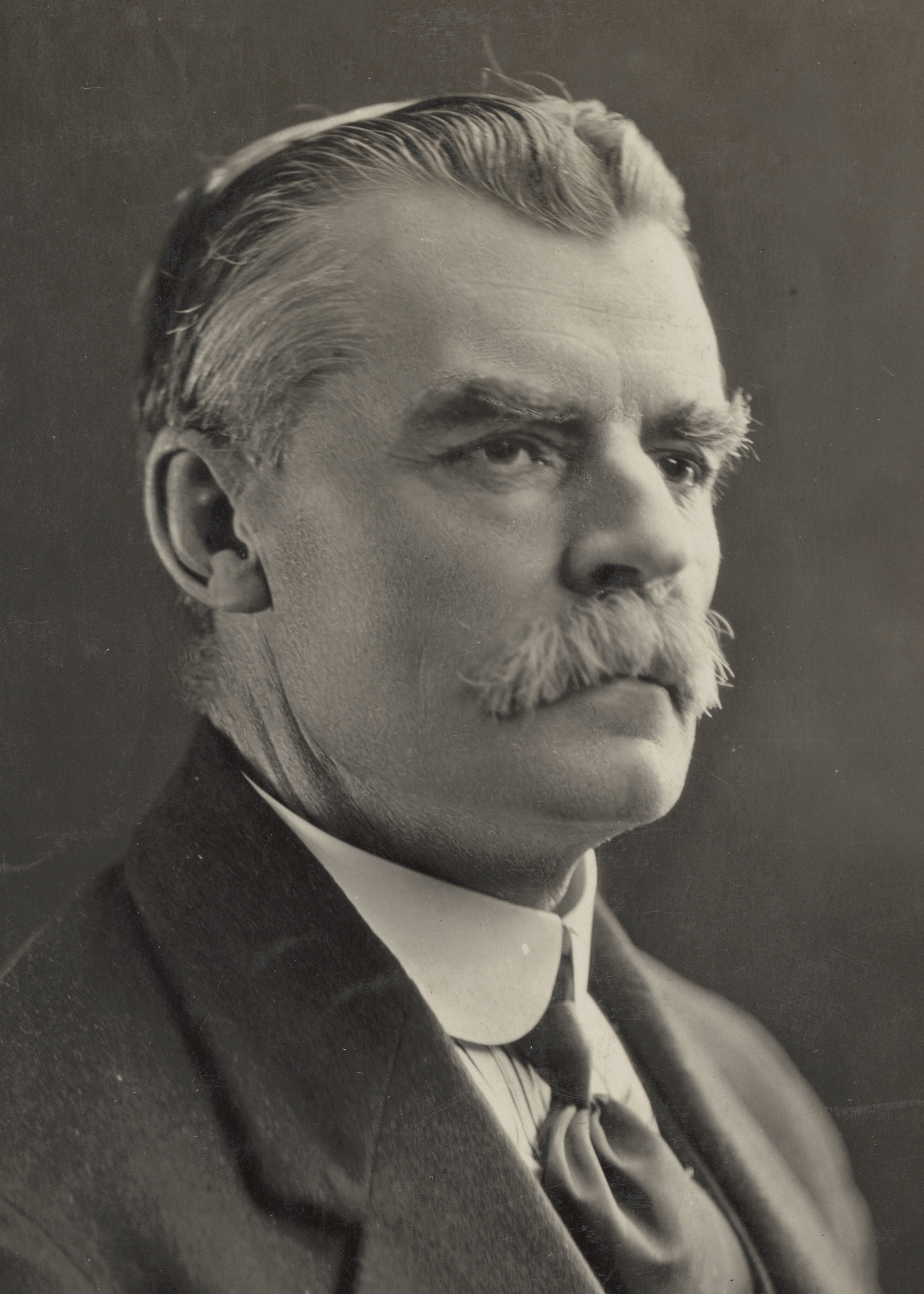
Matthew Charlton

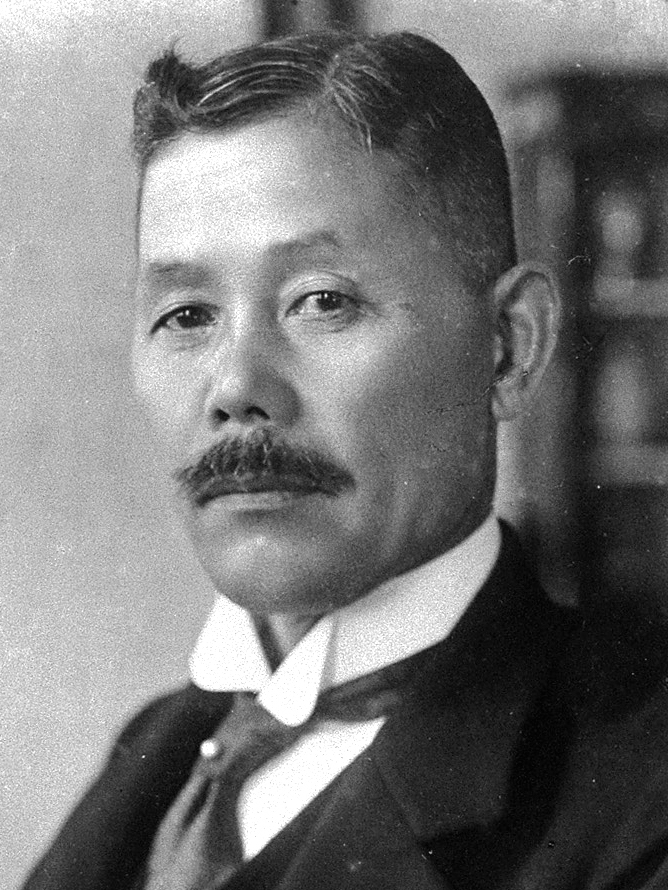
Wakatsuki Reijirō

- January 10 – Hermanus Johannes Lovink, Dutch agriculturalist and politician (d. 1938)
- January 13
  - George Gurdjieff, Russian spiritual teacher (d. 1949)
  - Vasily Kalinnikov, Russian composer (d. 1901)
- January 15
  - Nathan Söderblom, Swedish archbishop, recipient of the Nobel Peace Prize (d. 1931)
  - Horatio Dresser, American New Thought religious leader and writer (d. 1954)
- January 16 – Percy Pilcher, English inventor and pioneer aviator (d. 1899)
- January 19 – Harry Davenport, American actor (d. 1949)
- January 29
  - Romain Rolland, French writer, Nobel Prize laureate (d. 1944)
  - Frank Tudor, Australian politician (d. 1922)
- February 1 – Agda Meyerson, Swedish nurse and healthcare profession activist (d. 1924)
- February 2 – Enrique Simonet, Spanish painter (d. 1927)
- February 9 – George Ade, American writer, newspaper columnist and playwright (d. 1944)
- February 18 – Janko Vukotić, Montenegrin general (d. 1927)
- February 26 – Herbert Henry Dow, Canadian chemical industrialist (d. 1930)
- March 5 – Arthur Leopold Busch, English-born American submarine pioneer (d. 1956)
- March 7 – Hans Fruhstorfer, German lepidopterist (d. 1922)
- March 13 – Friedrich Boedicker, German admiral (d. 1944)
- March 15 – Matthew Charlton, Australian politician (d. 1948)
- March 19 – Emilio De Bono, Italian general and fascist activist (d. 1944)
- March 21
  - James Harbord, American general (d. 1947)
  - Wakatsuki Reijirō, 25th and 28th Prime Minister of Japan (d. 1949)

=== April–June ===
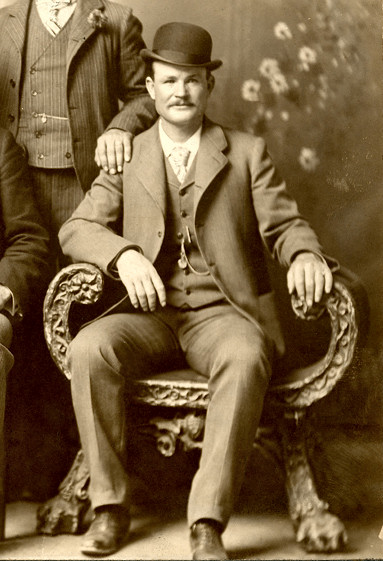
Butch Cassidy

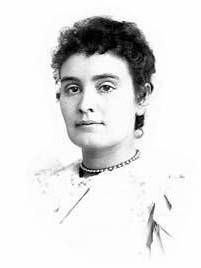
Anne Sullivan

- April 1 – Ferruccio Busoni, Italian pianist and composer (d. 1924)
- April 3 – J. B. M. Hertzog, Boer General and 3rd Prime Minister of South Africa (d. 1942)
- April 8 – Alfred Allen, American actor (d. 1947)
- April 13 – Butch Cassidy, American outlaw (k. 1908)
- April 14 – Anne Sullivan, American tutor of Helen Keller (d. 1936)
- April 17 – Ernest Starling, English physiologist (d. 1927)
- April 18 – Yamaya Tanin, Japanese admiral (d. 1940)
- April 21 – Josefa Toledo de Aguerri, Nicaraguan pioneer educator (d. 1962)
- April 22 – Hans von Seeckt, German general (d. 1936)
- April 24 – Ishii Kikujirō, Japanese diplomat (d. 1945)
- May 10 – Richard H. Jackson, American four-star admiral (d. 1971)
- May 17 – Erik Satie, French composer (d. 1925)
- May 22 – Charles F. Haanel, American New Thought author and businessman (d. 1949)
- June 4 – Miina Sillanpää, Finnish politician (d. 1952)
- June 26
  - George Herbert, 5th Earl of Carnarvon, English financier of Egyptian excavations (d. 1923)
  - Josef Swickard, German actor (d. 1940)

=== July–September ===
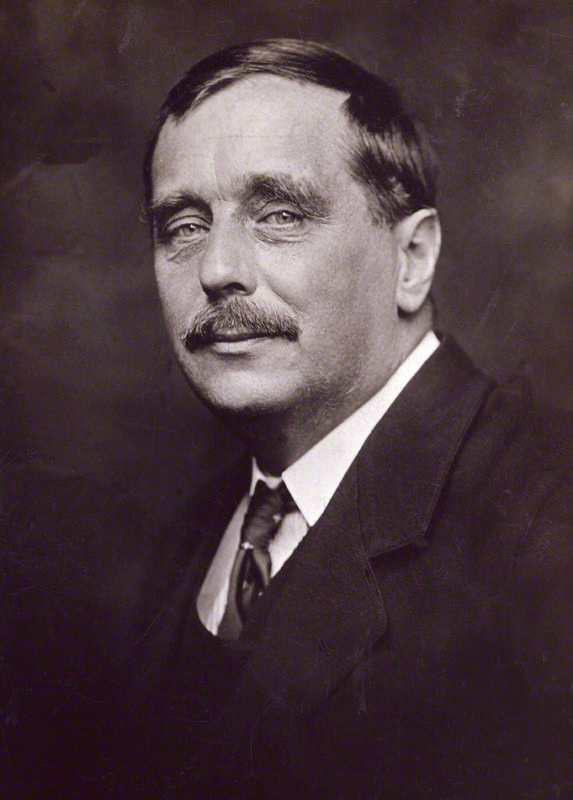
H. G. Wells

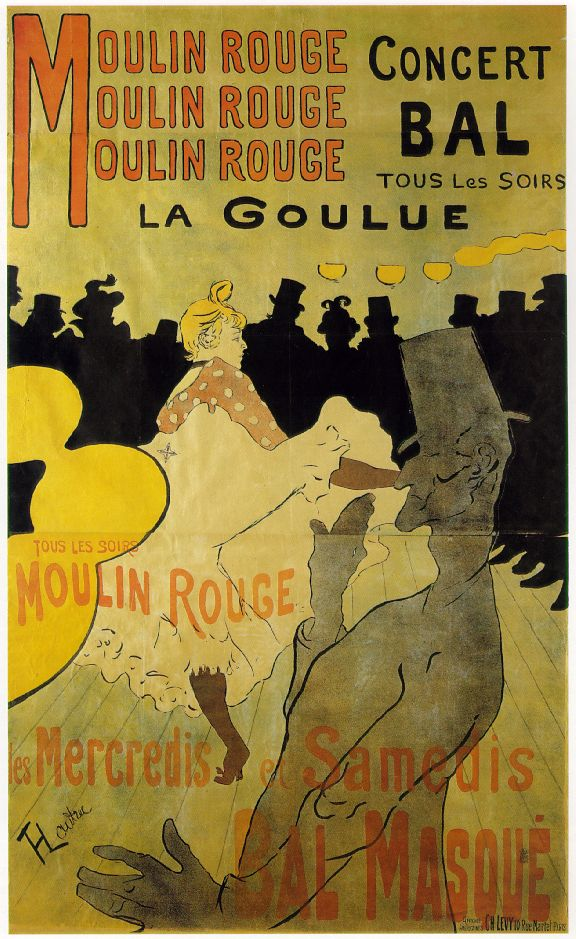
La Goulue

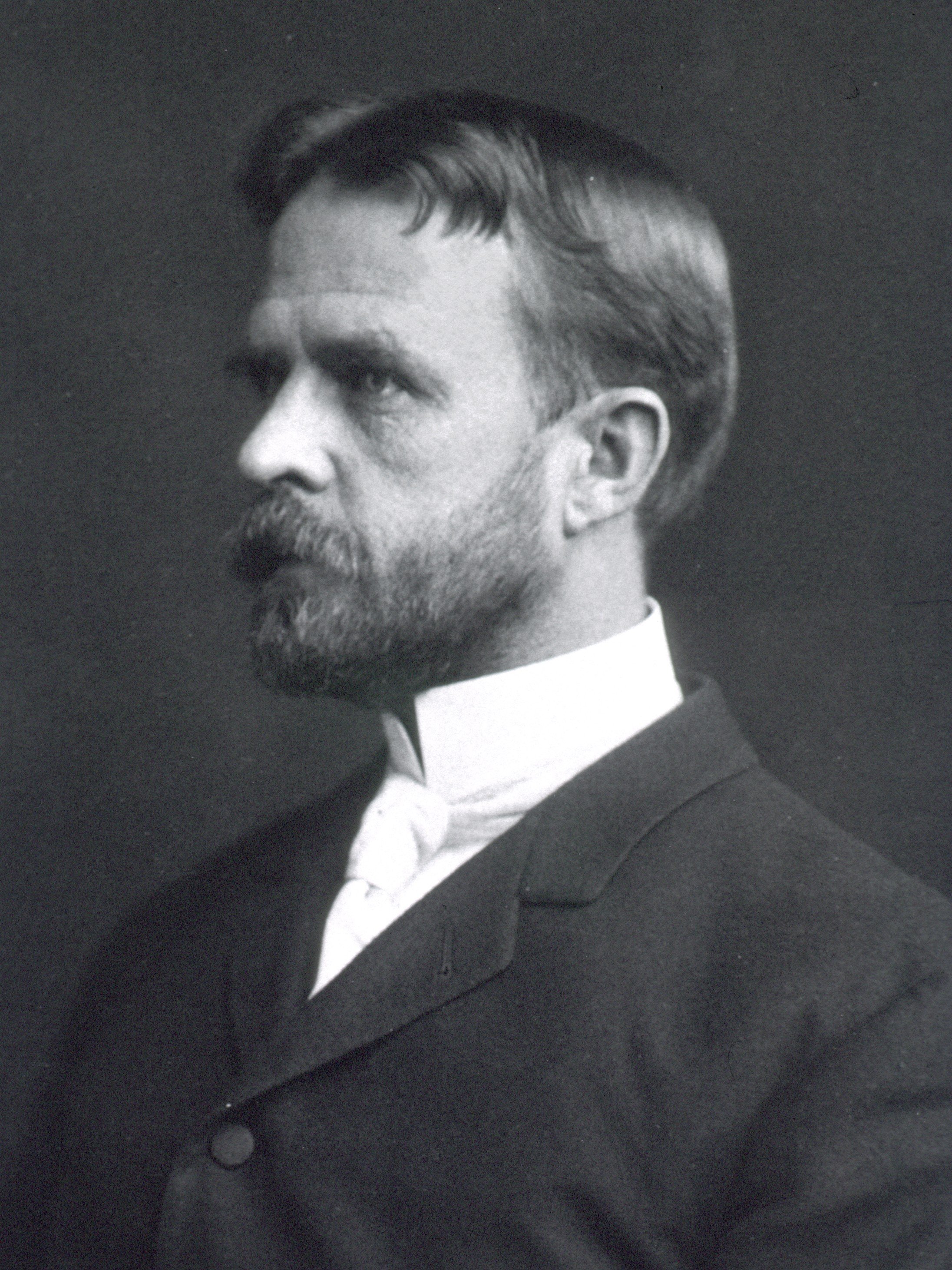
Thomas Hunt Morgan

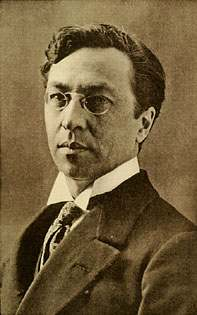
Wassily Kandinsky

- July 6 – Charles Mangin, French general (d. 1925)
- July 9 – Macklyn Arbuckle, American actor (d. 1931)
- July 13 – La Goulue, French dancer (d. 1929)
- July 25 – Frederick Blackman, English plant physiologist (d. 1947)
- July 27 – António José de Almeida, 6th President of Portugal and 64th Prime Minister of Portugal (d. 1929)
- July 28 – Beatrix Potter, English children's author (Peter Rabbit and Jemima Puddle-Duck) (d. 1943)
- August 2 – Adrien de Gerlache, Belgian naval officer and explorer (d. 1934)
- August 4 – Gheorghe Mărdărescu, Romanian general and politician (d. 1938)
- August 6 – Chief Thunderbird, Native American actor (d. 1946)
- August 8 – Matthew Henson, African-American explorer (d. 1955)
- August 12 – Jacinto Benavente, Spanish writer, Nobel Prize laureate (d. 1954)
- August 14 – Dmitry Merezhkovsky, Russian novelist, poet and religious thinker (d. 1941)
- September 1

- James J. Corbett, American boxer (d. 1933)
- Thomas F. Woodlock, editor of The Wall Street Journal and Interstate Commerce Commission commissioner (d. 1945)

- September 7 – Tristan Bernard, French writer (d. 1947)
- September 10 – Jeppe Aakjær, Danish poet and novelist (d. 1930)
- September 16 – Joe Vila, American sportswriter (d. 1934)
- September 21
  - Charles Nicolle, French bacteriologist, recipient of the Nobel Prize in Physiology or Medicine (d. 1936)
  - H. G. Wells, English writer (d. 1946)
- September 22 – Witmer Stone, American ornithologist and botanist (d. 1939)
- September 27 – Eurosia Fabris, Italian Catholic Blessed (d. 1932)
- September 25 – Thomas Hunt Morgan, American geneticist, recipient of the Nobel Prize in Physiology or Medicine (d. 1945)

=== October–December ===
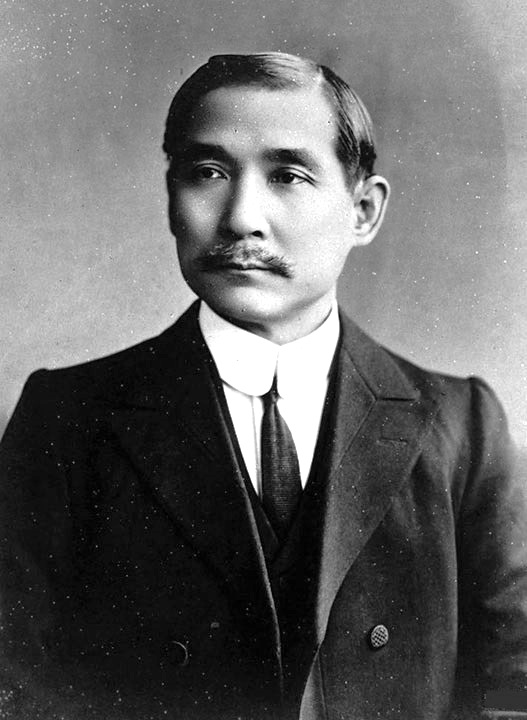
Sun Yat-sen

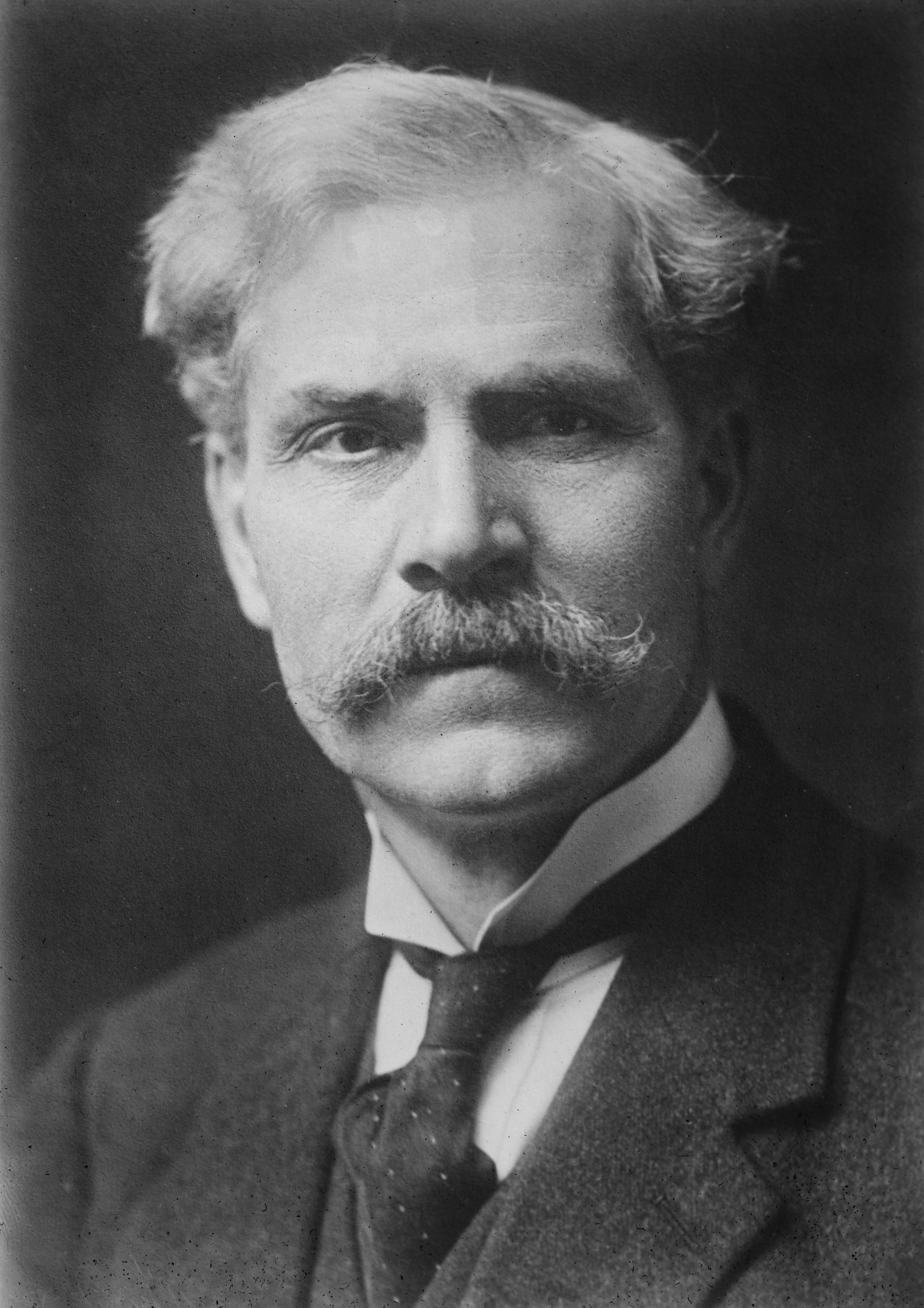
Ramsay MacDonald

- October 6
  - Reginald Fessenden, Canadian inventor (d. 1932)
  - Nina Bang, Danish politician (d. 1928)
- October 12 – Ramsay MacDonald, Scottish Prime Minister of the United Kingdom (d. 1937)
- October 29
  - Antonio Luna, Filipino general (d. 1899)
  - Dmitri Parsky, Russian general (d. 1921)
- November 3 – Paul Lincke, German composer (d. 1946)
- November 11 – Martha Annie Whiteley, English chemist and mathematician (d. 1956)
- November 12 – Sun Yat-sen, Chinese revolutionary (d. 1925)
- November 16 – Cornelia Sorabji, Indian-born lawyer (d. 1954)
- November 28
  - Sy Sanborn, American sportswriter (d. 1934)
  - David Warfield, American stage actor (d. 1951)
- November 30
  - Robert Broom, Scottish paleontologist (d. 1951)
  - Andrey Lyapchev, 22nd Prime Minister of Bulgaria (d. 1933)
- December 2 – Constantin Cristescu, Romanian general (d. 1923)
- December 11 – Ada Baker, Australian soprano, singing teacher and vaudeville star (d. 1949)
- December 12 – Alfred Werner, German chemist, Nobel Prize laureate (d. 1919)
- December 16 (December 4 O.S.) – Wassily Kandinsky, Russian-born painter (d. 1944)
- December 17 – Kazys Grinius, 5th Prime Minister of Lithuania (d. 1950)
- December 29 – Marie Cahill, American singer and actress (d. 1933)

=== Date unknown ===
- Ilia Solomonovich Abelman, Russian astronomer (d. 1898)
- William M. Dalton, American Old West outlaw (d. 1894)

1867

=== January–February ===
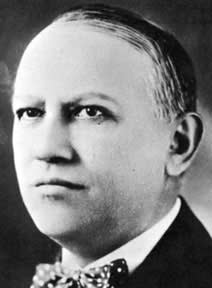
Carl Laemmle

- January 5 – Dimitrios Gounaris, 94th Prime Minister of Greece (d. 1922)
- January 6 – Takejirō Tokonami, Japanese politician, Home Minister, Railway Minister and Minister of Communication (d. 1935)
- January 8
  - Emily Greene Balch, American writer, pacifist, recipient of the Nobel Peace Prize (d. 1961)
  - Thomas Coward, English ornithologist (d. 1933)
- January 17
  - Jacob Christiaan Koningsberger, Dutch biologist and politician (d. 1951)
  - Carl Laemmle, German-born film executive (d. 1939)
- January 18 – Rubén Darío, Nicaraguan poet (d. 1916)
- January 20 – Yvette Guilbert, French singer, actress (d. 1944)
- January 21
  - James Marcus, American actor (d. 1937)
  - Maxime Weygand, French general (d. 1965)
- January 29 – Carl L. Boeckmann, Norwegian-American artist (d. 1923)
- February 4 – Alexander Godley, British general (d. 1957)
- February 7 – Laura Elizabeth Wilder, née Ingalls, American children's author (d. 1957)
- February 8 – William Michael Crose, United States Navy Commander and the seventh Naval Governor of American Samoa (d. 1929)
- February 10 – Charles W. Bryan, American politician (d. 1945)
- February 21 – Otto Hermann Kahn, German-born American millionaire, philanthropist (d. 1934)
- February 27 – Irving Fisher, American economist (d. 1947)

=== March–April ===
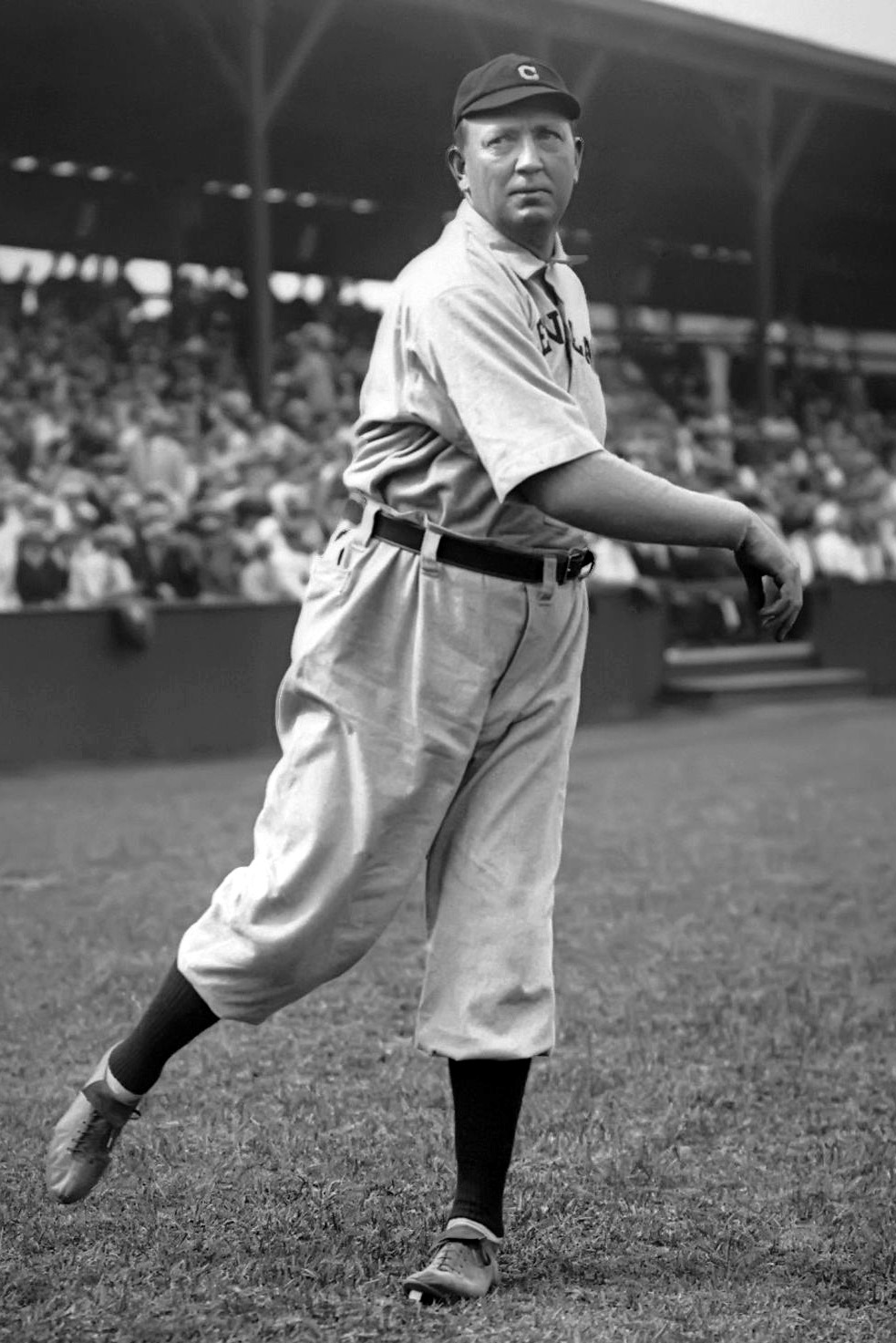
Cy Young

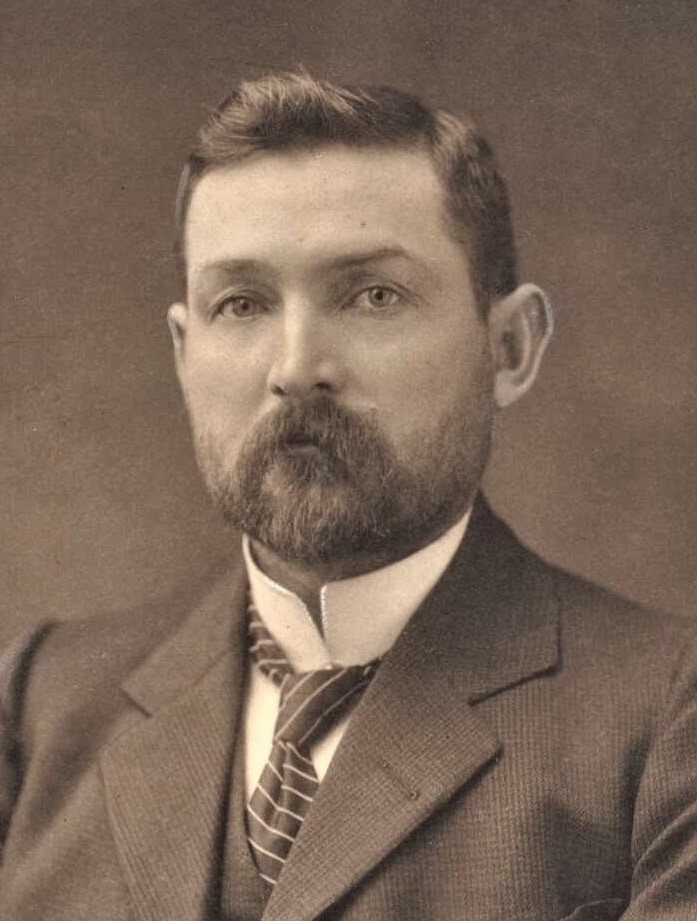
Chris Watson

- March 4 – Charles Pelot Summerall, American general (d. 1955)
- March 6 – Samuel Franklin Cody, American aviation pioneer (d. 1913)
- March 18 – Louis R. de Steiguer, American admiral (d. 1947)
- March 19 – Sakichi Toyoda, Japanese inventor, industrialist (d. 1930)
- March 21 – Florenz Ziegfeld Jr., American theatrical producer (d. 1932)
- March 25
  - Arturo Toscanini, Italian conductor (d. 1957)
  - Gutzon Borglum, American artist and sculptor (Mount Rushmore) (d. 1941)
- March 26 – Arnold Theiler, founder of the Onderstepoort Veterinary Research Institute in South Africa (d. 1936)
- March 29 – Cy Young, American baseball player (d. 1955)
- April 2 – Eugen Sandow, German-born body builder, circus performer (d. 1925)
- April 7 – Holger Pedersen, Danish linguist (d. 1953)
- April 9 – Chris Watson, 3rd Prime Minister of Australia (d. 1941)
- April 10 – George William Russell, Irish nationalist, poet and artist (d. 1935)
- April 13 – Sammy Woods, English cricketer (d. 1931)
- April 16 – Wilbur Wright, American aviation pioneer, co-inventor of the airplane with brother Orville (d. 1912)
- April 23 – Johannes Fibiger, Danish scientist, recipient of the Nobel Prize in Physiology or Medicine (d. 1928)

=== May–June ===
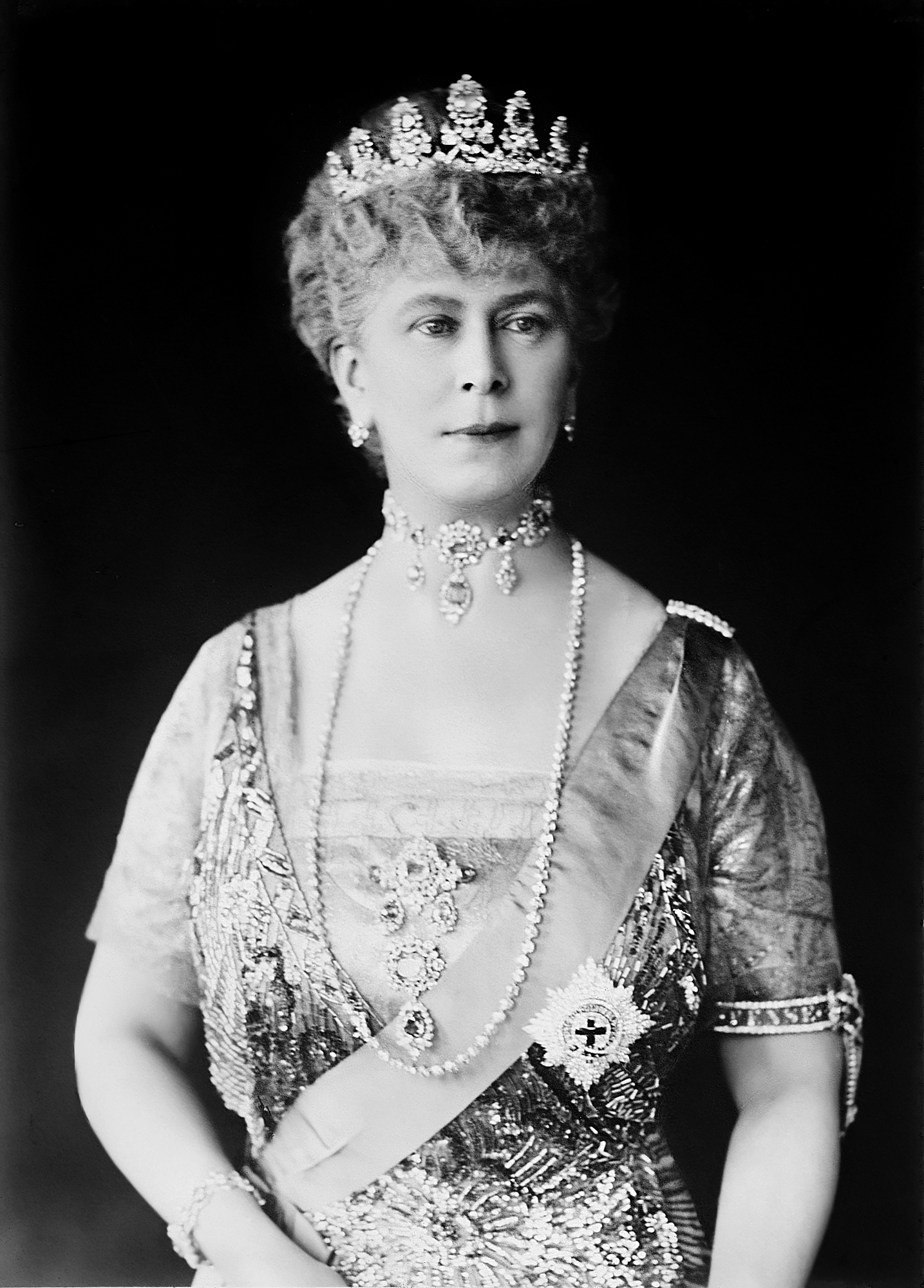
Queen Mary

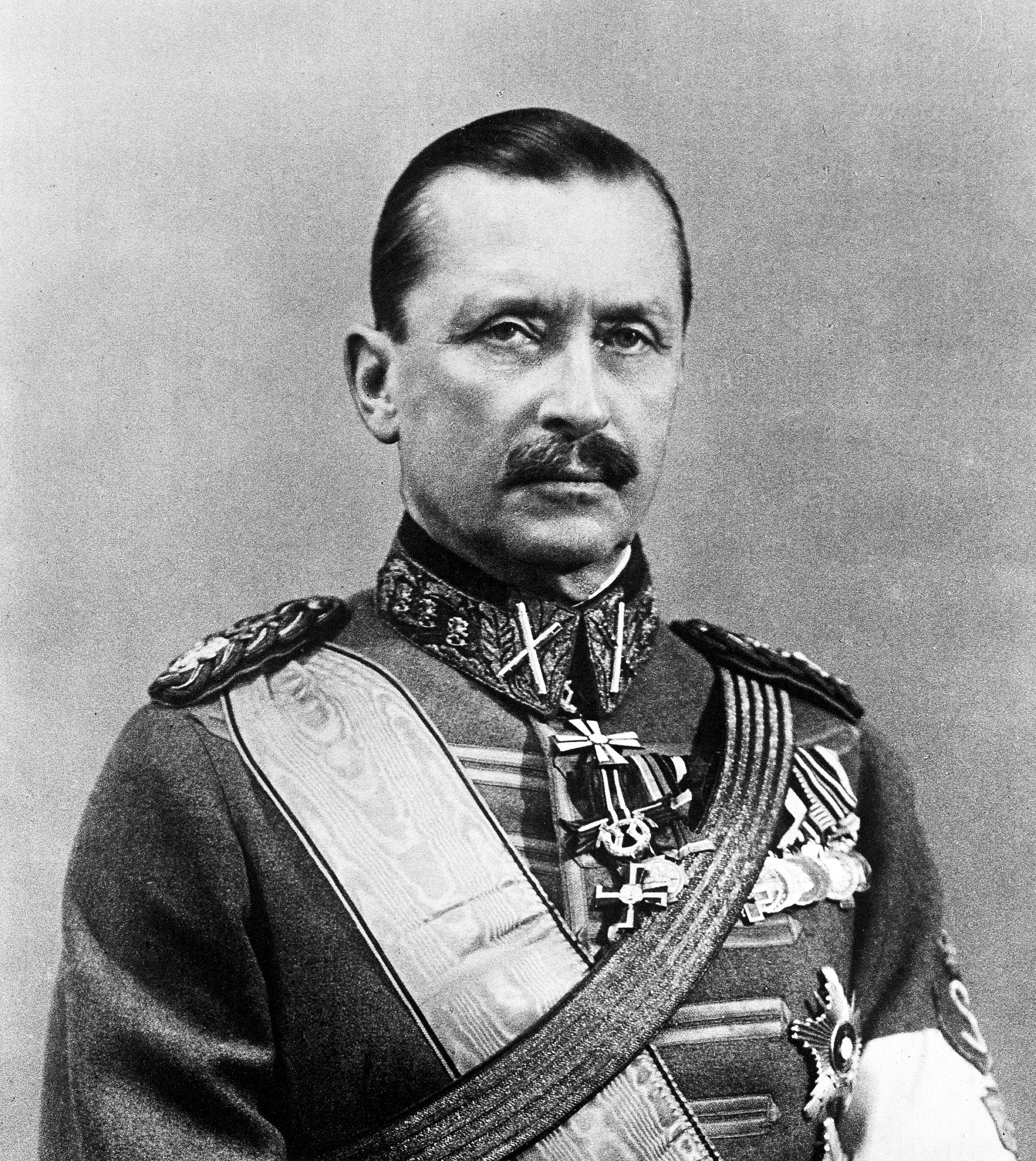
Carl Gustaf Emil Mannerheim

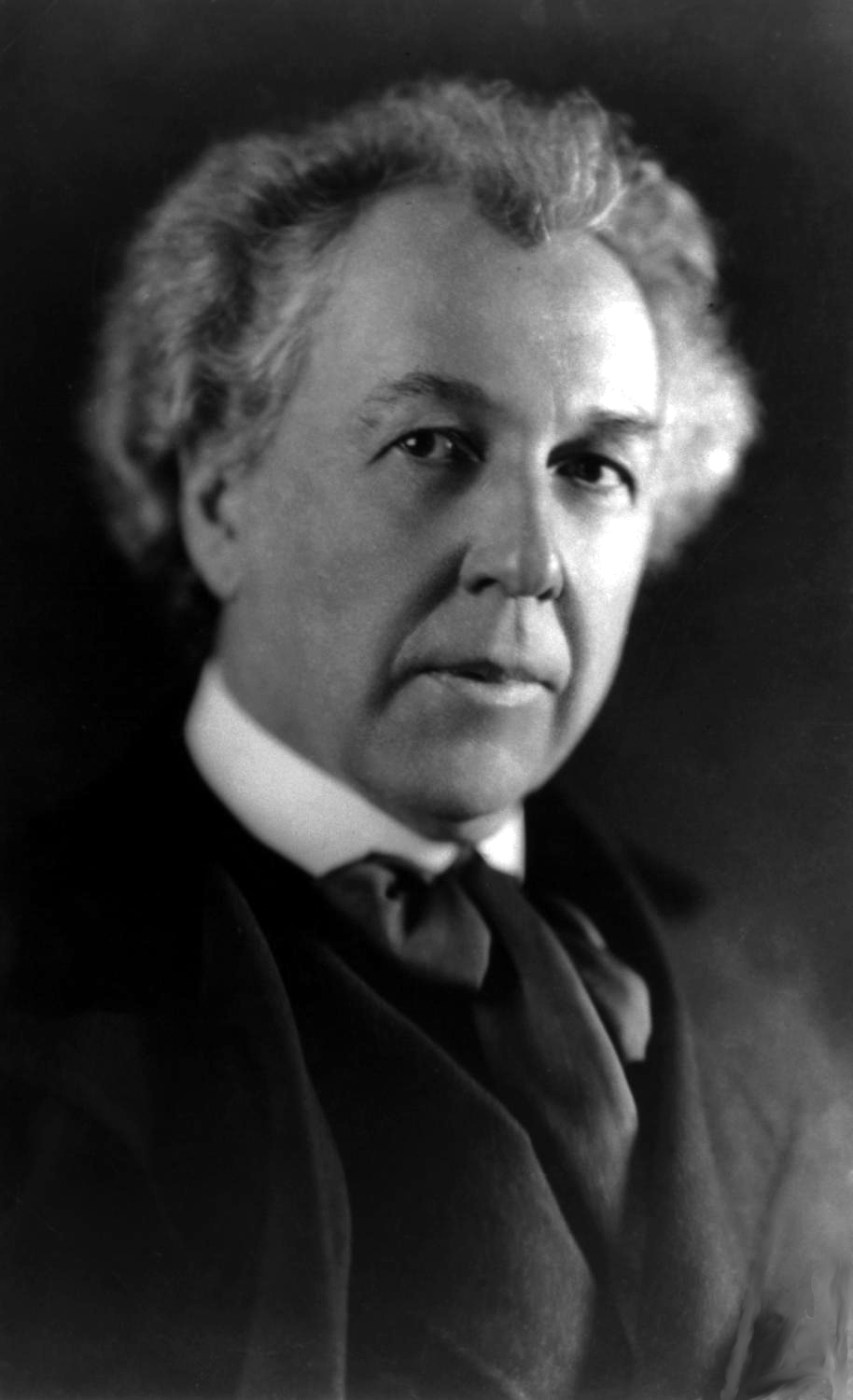
Frank Lloyd Wright

- May 3 – J. T. Hearne, English cricketer (d. 1944)
- May 7 – Władysław Reymont, Polish writer, Nobel Prize laureate (d. 1925)
- May 14 – Kurt Eisner, German politician, publicist (d. 1919)
- May 26 – Queen Mary, wife of George V of Great Britain (d. 1953)
- June 2 – William Goodenough, British admiral (d. 1945)
- June 4 – Carl Gustaf Emil Mannerheim, Finnish military leader and 6th President of Finland (d. 1951)
- June 8 – Frank Lloyd Wright, American architect (d. 1959)
- June 9 – Clarence Geldart, Canadian-American actor (d. 1935)
- June 17 – Flora Finch, British-American silent film comedian (d. 1940)
- June 20 – Leon Wachholz, Polish scientist and medical examiner (d. 1942)
- June 24 – J. Gordon Edwards, American film director (d. 1925)
- June 28 – Luigi Pirandello, Italian writer, Nobel Prize laureate (d. 1936)
- June 30 – Edward L. Beach, Sr., American naval officer, author (d. 1943)

=== July–August ===
- July 8 – Käthe Kollwitz, German artist (d. 1945)
- July 10 – Prince Maximilian of Baden, Chancellor of Germany (d. 1929)
- July 18 – Margaret "Molly" Brown, American socialite, philanthropist, and RMS Titanic survivor (d. 1932)
- July 24 – E. F. Benson, English writer (d. 1940)
- July 27 – Enrique Granados, Spanish composer (d. 1916)
- July 28 – Charles Dillon Perrine, American-born astronomer (d. 1951)
- July 29 – Berthold Oppenheim, Moravian rabbi (d. 1942)
- August 3 – Stanley Baldwin, Prime Minister of the United Kingdom (d. 1947)
- August 9 – Evelina Haverfield, British suffragette (d. 1920)
- August 11 – Hobart Bosworth, American film actor, director, writer and producer (d. 1943)
- August 12 – Edith Hamilton, German-born American educator, author (d. 1963)
- August 14 – John Galsworthy, English writer, Nobel Prize laureate (d. 1933)
- August 22 – Maximilian Bircher-Benner, Swiss physician, nutritionist (d. 1939)
- August 28 – Umberto Giordano, Italian opera composer (d. 1948)

=== September–October ===
- September 5 – Amy Beach, American pianist, composer (d. 1944)
- September 7 – Albert Bassermann, German actor (d. 1952)
- September 12 – Alfredo Acton, Italian admiral and politician (d. 1934)
- September 16 – Vintilă Brătianu, 31st Prime Minister of Romania (d. 1930)
- September 17 – W. H. Ellis, American attorney and politician (d. 1948)
- September 21 – Charles Bathurst, 1st Viscount Bledisloe, English politician, 4th Governor-General of New Zealand (d. 1958)
- September 28
  - James Edwin Campbell, American educator, school administrator, newspaper editor, poet, and essayist (d. 1896)
  - Hiranuma Kiichirō, 24th Prime Minister of Japan (d. 1952)
- September 29 – Walther Rathenau, German statesman, Weimar Republic foreign minister (d. 1922)
- October 2 – James Stevenson-Hamilton, 1st warden of South Africa's Kruger National Park (d. 1957)
- October 12 – Lyn Harding, Welsh actor (d. 1952)
- October 14 – Masaoka Shiki, Japanese haiku poet (d. 1902)
- October 16 – Mario Ruspoli, 2nd Prince of Poggio Suasa (d. 1963)
- October 25
  - Hiranuma Kiichirō, 35th Prime Minister of Japan (d. 1952)
  - Józef Dowbor-Muśnicki, Polish general (d. 1937)
- October 27 – Viola Allen, American actress (d. 1948)
- October 30 – Ed Delahanty, American Baseball Hall of Famer (d. 1903)

=== November–December ===
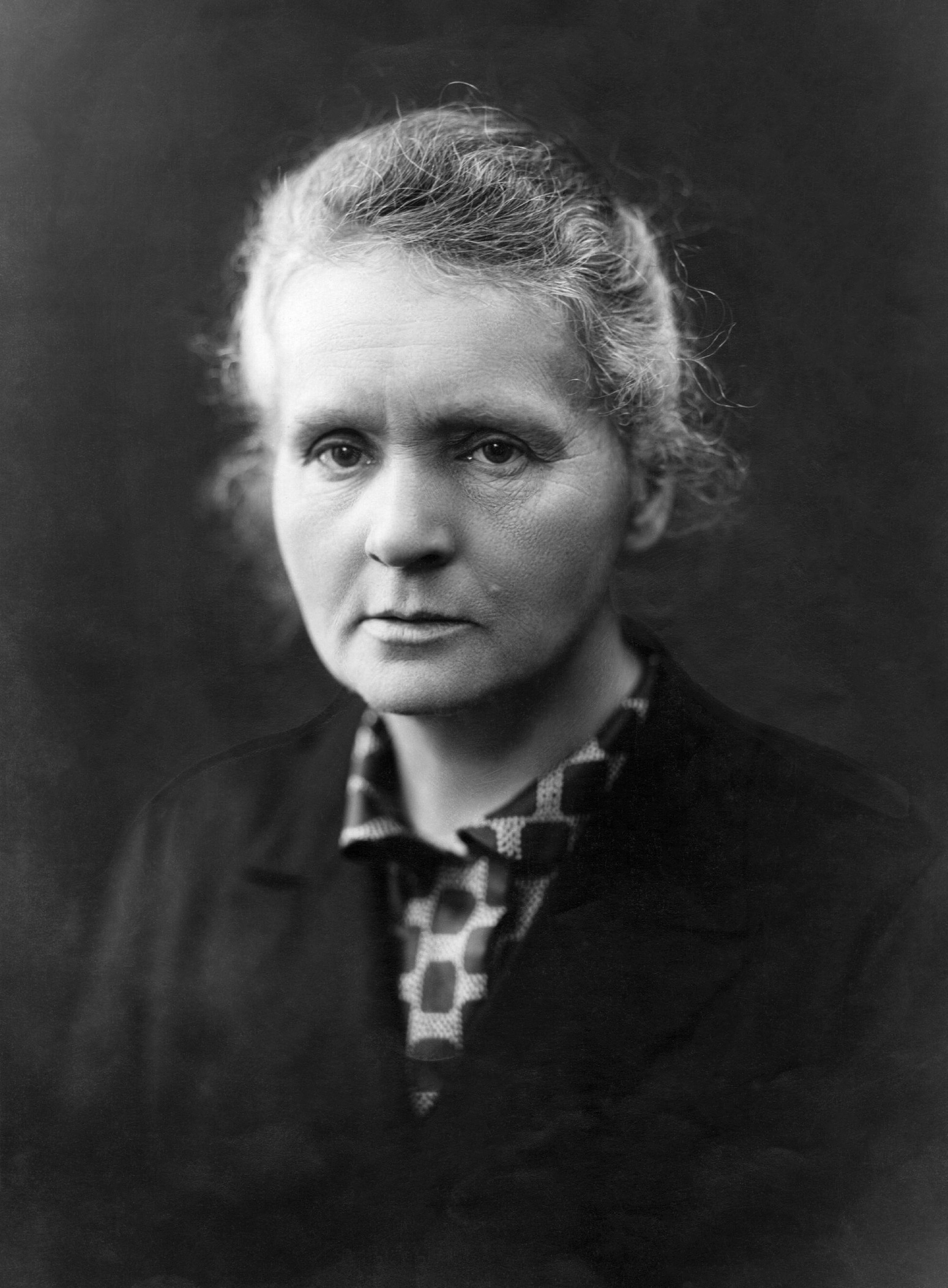
Marie Curie

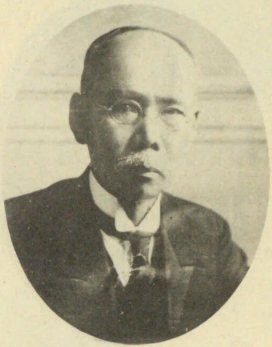
Nakamura Yoshikoto

- November 7
  - Marie Curie, Polish-born scientist, recipient of the Nobel Prize in Chemistry and physics (d. 1934)
  - George Paish, English economist (d. 1957)
- November 8 – Sadakichi Hartmann, German/Japanese critic, poet (d. 1944)
- November 9 – Shrimad Rajchandra, prominent Indian Jain philosopher, scholar, poet & spiritual mentor of Mahatma Gandhi (d. 1901)
- November 17 – Henri Gouraud, French general (d. 1946)
- November 30 – János Vaszary, Hungarian painter and graphic artist (d. 1939)
- December 1 – Ignacy Mościcki, President of Poland (d. 1946)
- December 2 – Alec B. Francis, English actor (d. 1934)
- December 5 – Józef Piłsudski, Polish statesman, field marshal (d. 1935)
- December 13 – Kristian Birkeland, Norwegian physicist (d. 1917)
- December 16 – Amy Carmichael, Irish Protestant missionary (d. 1951)
- December 18 – Nakamura Yoshikoto, Japanese entrepreneur and politician, Mayor of Tokyo (d. 1927)
- December 23 – Madam C. J. Walker, first African-American millionaire (d. 1919)
- December 23 – Clotilde Apponyi, Hungarian women's rights activist, diplomat (d. 1942)
- December 26 – Yordan Milanov, Bulgarian architect (d. 1932)

=== Date unknown ===
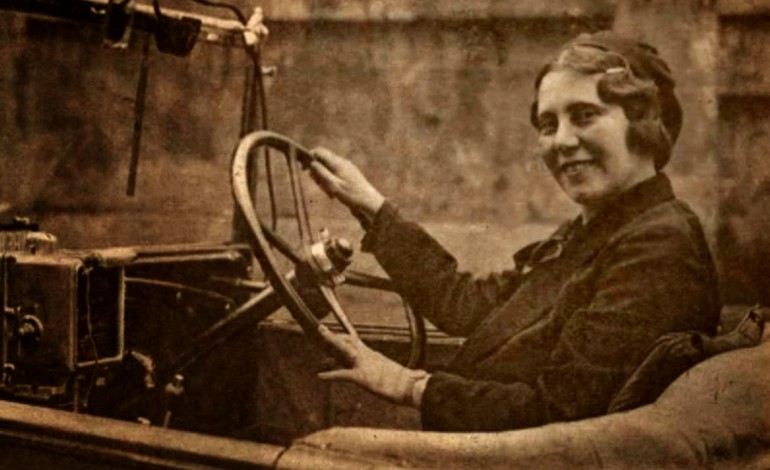
Elena Meissner

- Lilian Bell, American novelist and travel writer (d. 1929)
- Habib Pacha Es-Saad, 3rd Prime Minister and 2nd President of Lebanon (d. 1942)
- Florence Fuller, South African-born Australian artist (d. 1946)
- Zhang Haipeng, Chinese and Manchukuoan general (d. 1949)
- Abdul Awwal Jaunpuri, Indian Islamic scholar and author (d. 1921)
- Elena Meissner, Romanian women's rights activist (d. 1940)

1868

=== January–March ===
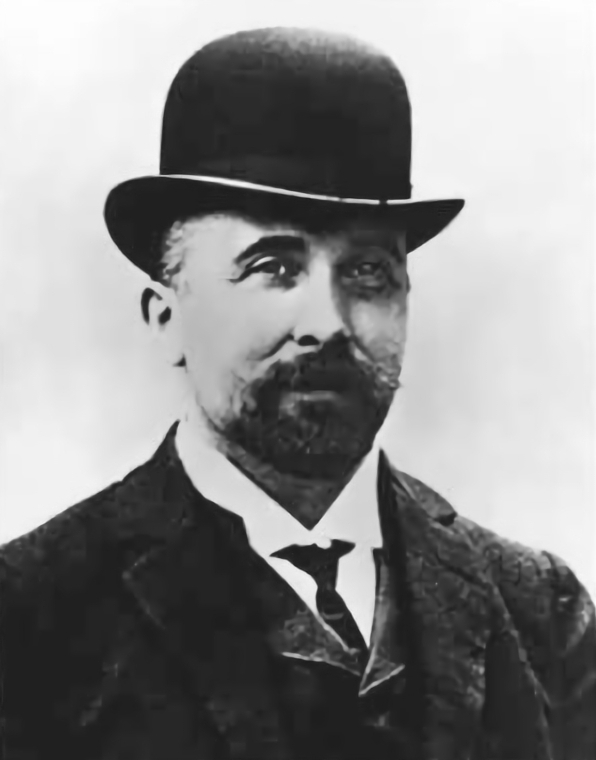
Felix Hoffmann

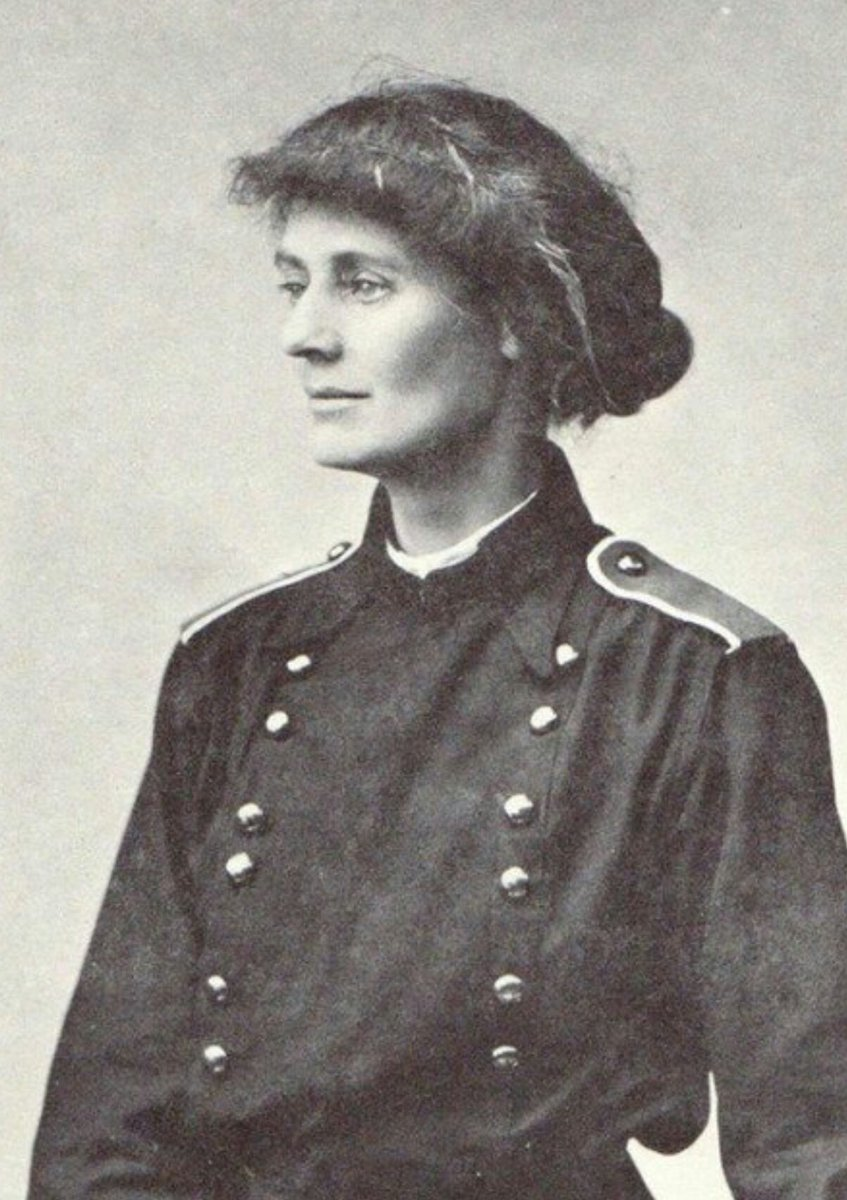
Countess Markiewicz

- January 1 – Snitz Edwards, Hungarian-born actor (d. 1937)
- January 6 – Vittorio Monti, Italian composer (d. 1922)
- January 9 – S. P. L. Sørensen, Danish chemist (d. 1939)
- January 11 – Cai Yuanpei, Chinese educator (d. 1940)
- January 15 – Otto von Lossow, Bavarian and German general (d. 1938)
- January 18 – Kantarō Suzuki, 29th Prime Minister of Japan (d. 1948)
- January 21 – Felix Hoffmann, German chemist (d. 1946)
- January 31 – Theodore William Richards, American chemist, Nobel Prize laureate (d. 1928)
- February 4 – Constance Markievicz, née Gore-Booth, Irish politician (d. 1927)
- February 5 – Maxine Elliott, American actress (d. 1940)
- February 12 – William Faversham, English actor (d. 1940)
- February 16 – Edward S. Curtis, American photographer, ethnologist, and film director (d. 1952)
- February 23 – W. E. B. Du Bois, African American civil rights leader (d. 1963)
- February 25
  - Constantin Dumitrescu, Romanian general (d. 1935)
  - Matsumura Tatsuo, Japanese admiral (d. 1932)
- February 26 – Venceslau Brás, Brazilian president (d. 1966)
- February 27 – Georges Brunet, French anarchist (d. 20th century)
- March 1
  - Sophie, Duchess of Hohenberg, née Countess Sophie Chotek von Wognin, Bohemian morganatic wife of Archduke Franz Ferdinand of Austria (k. 1914)
  - Adolf von Trotha, German admiral (d. 1940)
- March 14 – Emily Murphy, Canadian woman's rights activist (d. 1933)
- March 22 – Robert Andrews Millikan, American physicist, Nobel Prize laureate (d. 1953)
- March 25 – Bill Lockwood, English cricketer (d. 1932)
- March 28 – Maxim Gorky, Russian author (d. 1936)
- March 29 – Joseph Cawthorn, American actor (d. 1949)

=== April–June ===
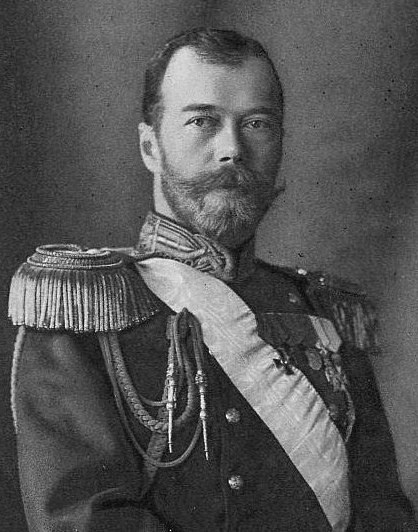
Nicholas II

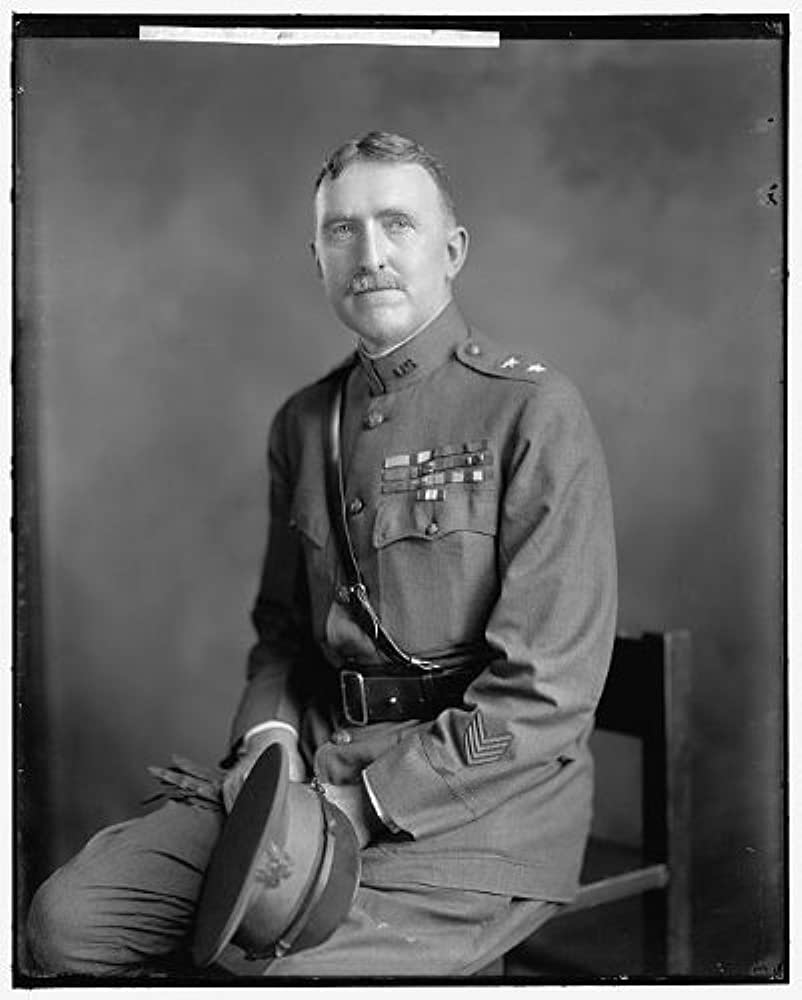
John L. Hines

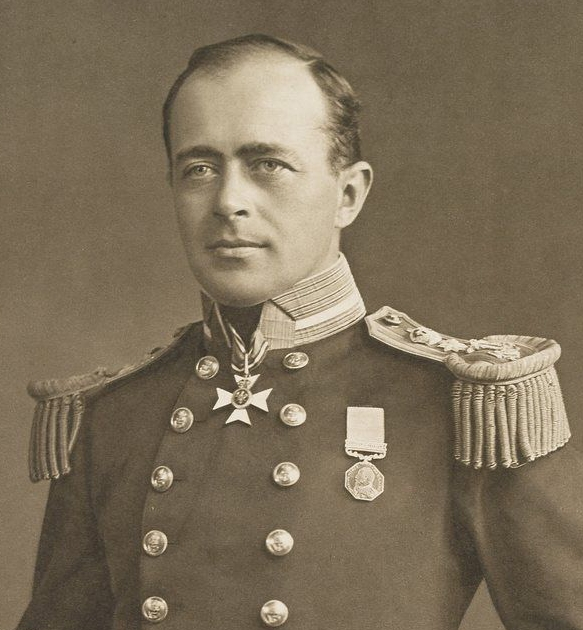
Robert Falcon Scott

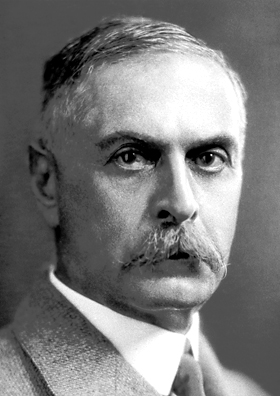
Karl Landsteiner

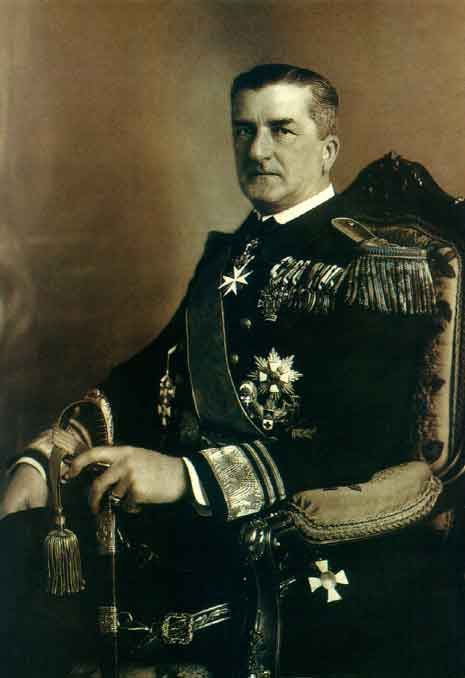
Miklós Horthy

- April 1 – Edmond Rostand, French poet and playwright (d. 1918)
- April 10 – George Arliss, English actor (d. 1946)
- April 12 – Akiyama Saneyuki, Japanese admiral (d. 1918)
- April 17 – Zdeňka Wiedermannová-Motyčková, Moravian pioneer of female education (d. 1915)
- April 25
  - John Moisant, American aviator (d. 1910)
  - Willie Maley, Scottish football player and manager (d. 1958)
- May 6 – Gaston Leroux, French writer (d. 1927)
- May 12 – Al Shean, German-born actor (d. 1949)
- May 18 (O. S. May 6) – Nicholas II, Emperor of Russia (d. 1918)
- May 21 – John L. Hines, American general, Chief of Staff of the U.S. Army (d. 1968)
- May 29 – Abdülmecid II, last Caliph of the Ottoman Empire (d. 1944)
- June – Fusajiro Yamauchi, Japanese entrepreneur and founder of Nintendo (d. 1929 or 1940)
- June 5 – James Connolly, Irish-Scots socialist (d. 1916)
- June 6 – Robert Falcon Scott, English Antarctic explorer (d. 1912)
- June 7
  - Charles Rennie Mackintosh, Scottish architect (d. 1928)
  - John Sealy Townsend, Irish mathematical physicist (d. 1957)
- June 14
  - Anna B. Eckstein, German peace campaigner (d. 1947)
  - Karl Landsteiner, Austrian biologist and physician, recipient of the Nobel Prize in Physiology or Medicine (d. 1943)
- June 21 – Edward Chaytor, New Zealand general (d. 1939)

=== July–September ===
- July 2 – Traian Moșoiu, Romanian general and politician (d. 1932)
- July 4 – Henrietta Swan Leavitt, American astronomer (d. 1921)
- July 12 – Stefan George, German poet (d. 1933)
- July 14 – Gertrude Bell, English archaeologist, writer, spy and administrator (d. 1926)
- July 15 – Nobuyoshi Mutō, Japanese field marshal and ambassador (d. 1933)
- July 17 – Mikhail Bakhirev, Russian admiral (d. 1920)
- July 19 – Florence Foster Jenkins, American socialite and amateur operatic soprano (d. 1944)
- July 20 – Patriarch Miron of Romania, 38th Prime Minister of Romania (d. 1939)
- July 24 – Princess Srivilailaksana The Princess of Suphanburi daughter of King Chulalongkorn of Siam and Chao Chom Manda Pae Bunnag (d.1904)
- July 28 – Theodor Wulf, German physicist and Jesuit (d. 1946)
- August 5 – Oskar Merikanto, Finnish composer (d. 1924)
- August 6 – Paul Claudel, French poet, dramatist and diplomat (d. 1955)
- August 7
  - Oo Zun, Burmese social worker and Buddhist nun (d. 1944)
  - Martin Wetzer, Finnish general (d. 1954)
- August 10 – Hugo Eckener, German dirigible engineer, Commander of Graf Zeppelin I (d. 1954)
- August 23 – Edgar Lee Masters, American poet, biographer and dramatist (d. 1950)
- August 26 – Charles Stewart, Premier of Alberta (d. 1946)
- September 1 – Henri Bourassa, Canadian politician and publisher (d. 1952)
- September 4 – Rudolf Reschreiter, Bavarian Painter
- September 6 – Heinrich Häberlin, Swiss politician, member of the Federal Council (d. 1947)
- September 17 – James Alexander Calder, Canadian politician (d. 1956)
- September 22 – John T. Raulston, American state judge (Scopes Monkey Trial) (d. 1956)

=== October–December ===
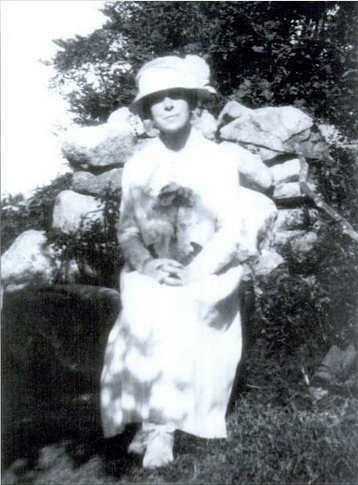
Mary Brewster Hazelton

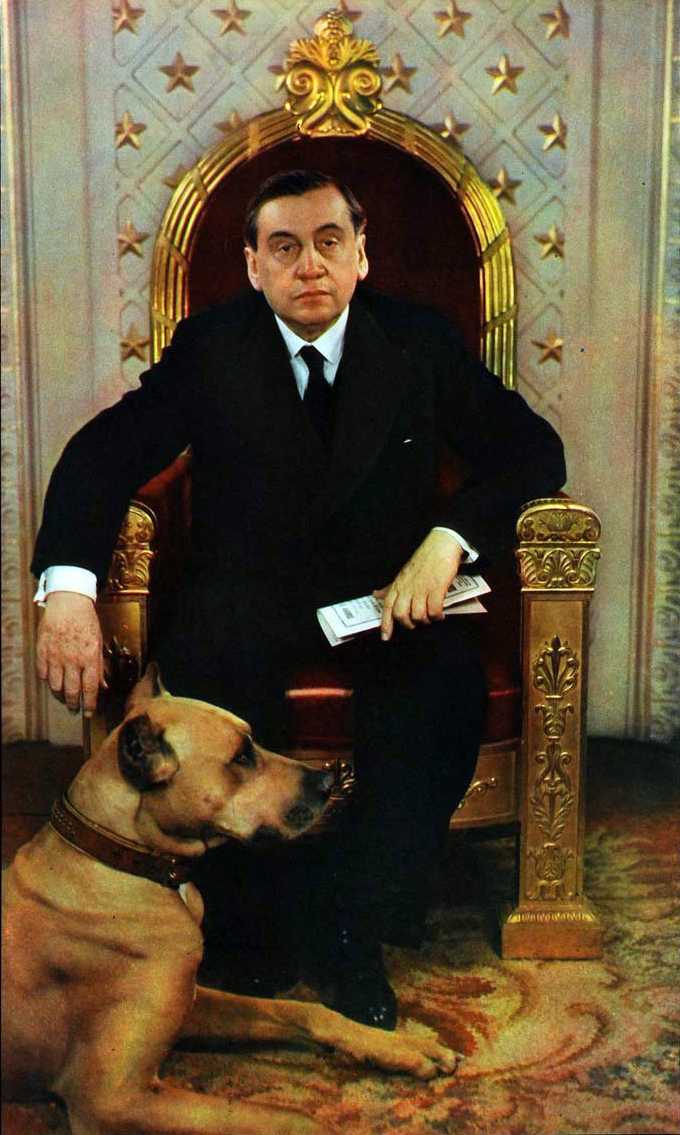
Arturo Alessandri

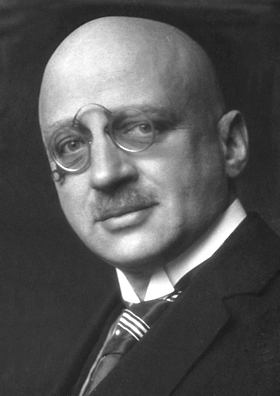
Fritz Haber

- October 4 – Marcelo Torcuato de Alvear, President of Argentina (d. 1942)
- October 15 – J. B. Johnson, American attorney and politician (d. 1940)
- October 21 – Ernest Swinton, British Army general (d. 1951)
- October 24 – Alexandra David-Néel, French explorer (d. 1969)
- October 30 – António Cabreira, Portuguese polygraph (d. 1953)
- November 7 – Delfim Moreira, Brazilian president (d. 1920)
- November 8 – Felix Hausdorff, German mathematician (d. 1942)
- November 9 – Marie Dressler, Canadian actress (d. 1934)
- November 10 – Gichin Funakoshi, Japanese founder of Shotokan karate, "father of modern karate" (d. 1957)
- November 17 – Korbinian Brodmann, German neurologist (d. 1918)
- November 23 – Mary Brewster Hazelton, American portrait painter (d. 1953)
- December 5 – Arnold Sommerfeld, German theoretical physicist (d. 1951)
- December 9 – Fritz Haber, German chemist, Nobel Prize laureate (d. 1934)
- December 19 – Eleanor H. Porter, American novelist (d. 1920)
- December 20 – Arturo Alessandri, Chilean statesman, 3-Time President of Chile (d. 1950)
- December 21 – George W. Fuller, American sanitation engineer (d. 1934)
- December 22 – Jaan Tõnisson, 2nd Prime Minister of Estonia (d. 1941?)
- December 25 – Eugenie Besserer, American silent film actress (d. 1934)
- probable – Scott Joplin, African American ragtime composer and pianist (d. 1917)

1869

=== January–March ===
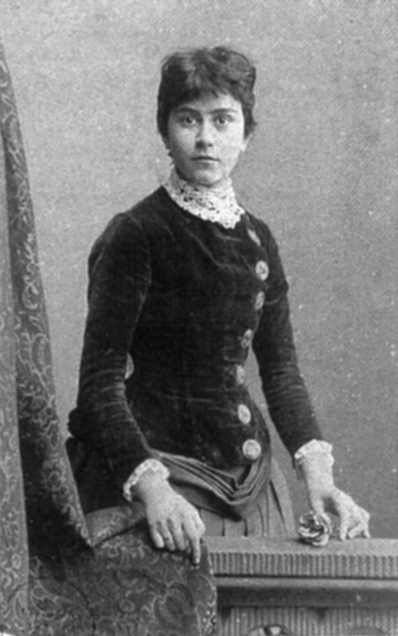
Else Lasker-Schüler

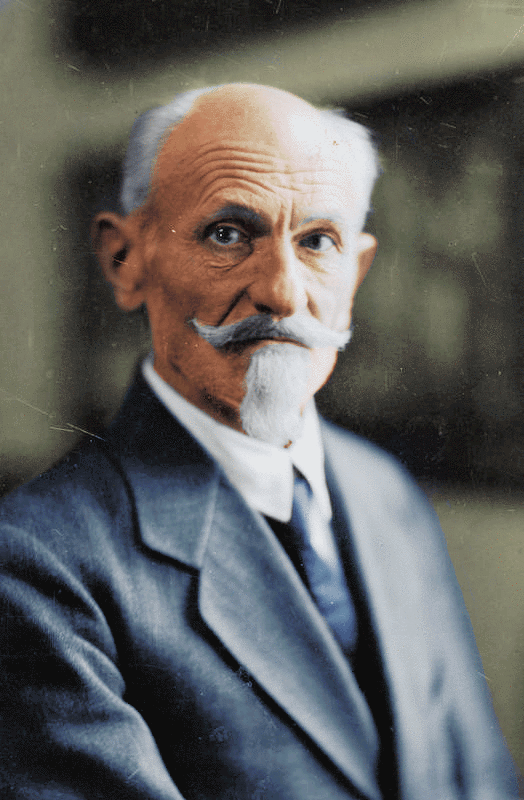
Stanisław Wojciechowski

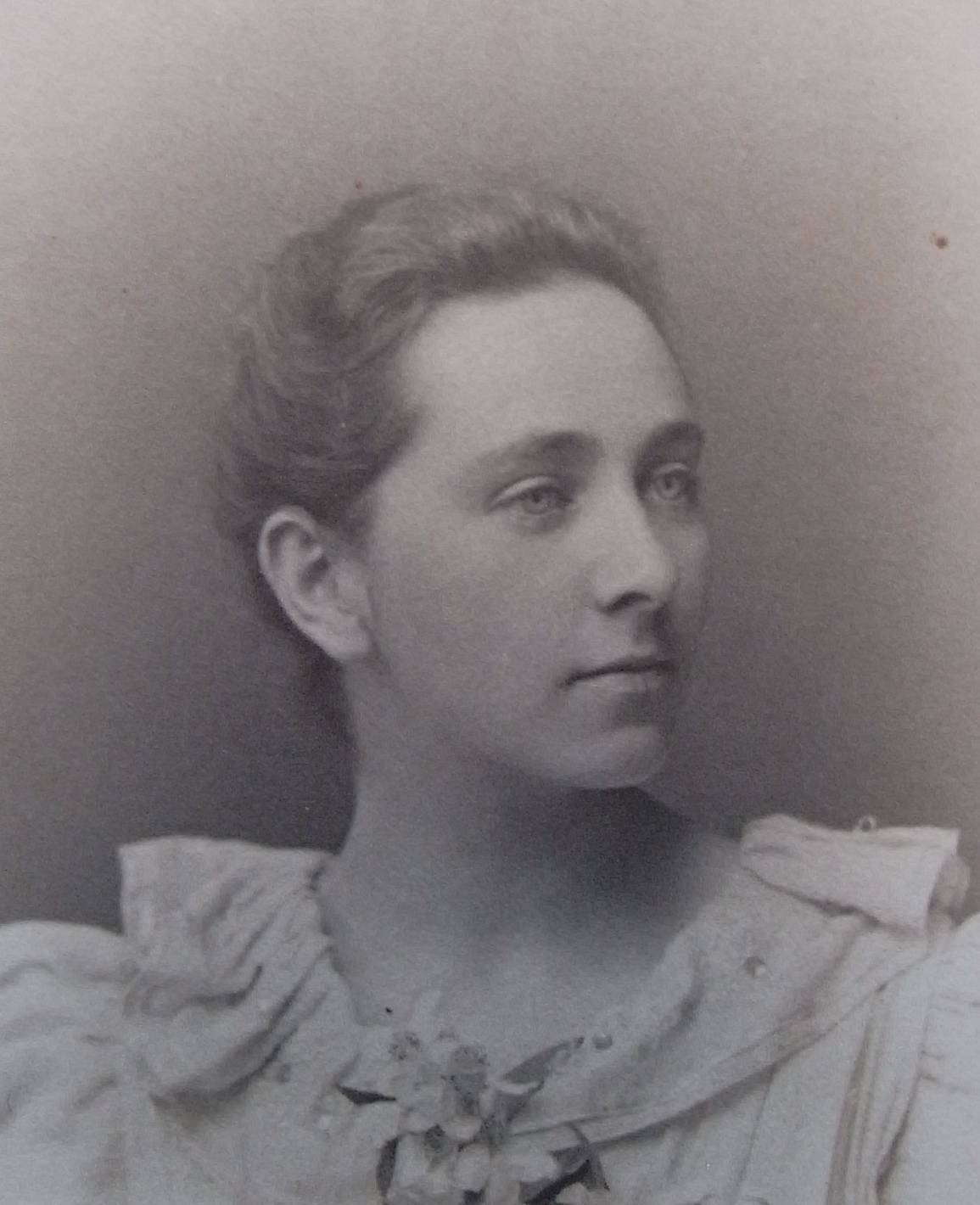
Edith Anne Stoney

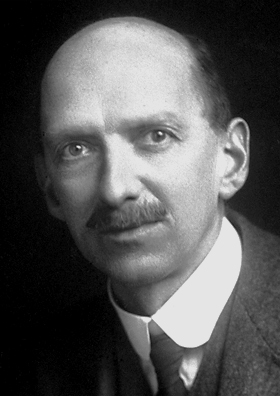
Charles Thomson Rees Wilson

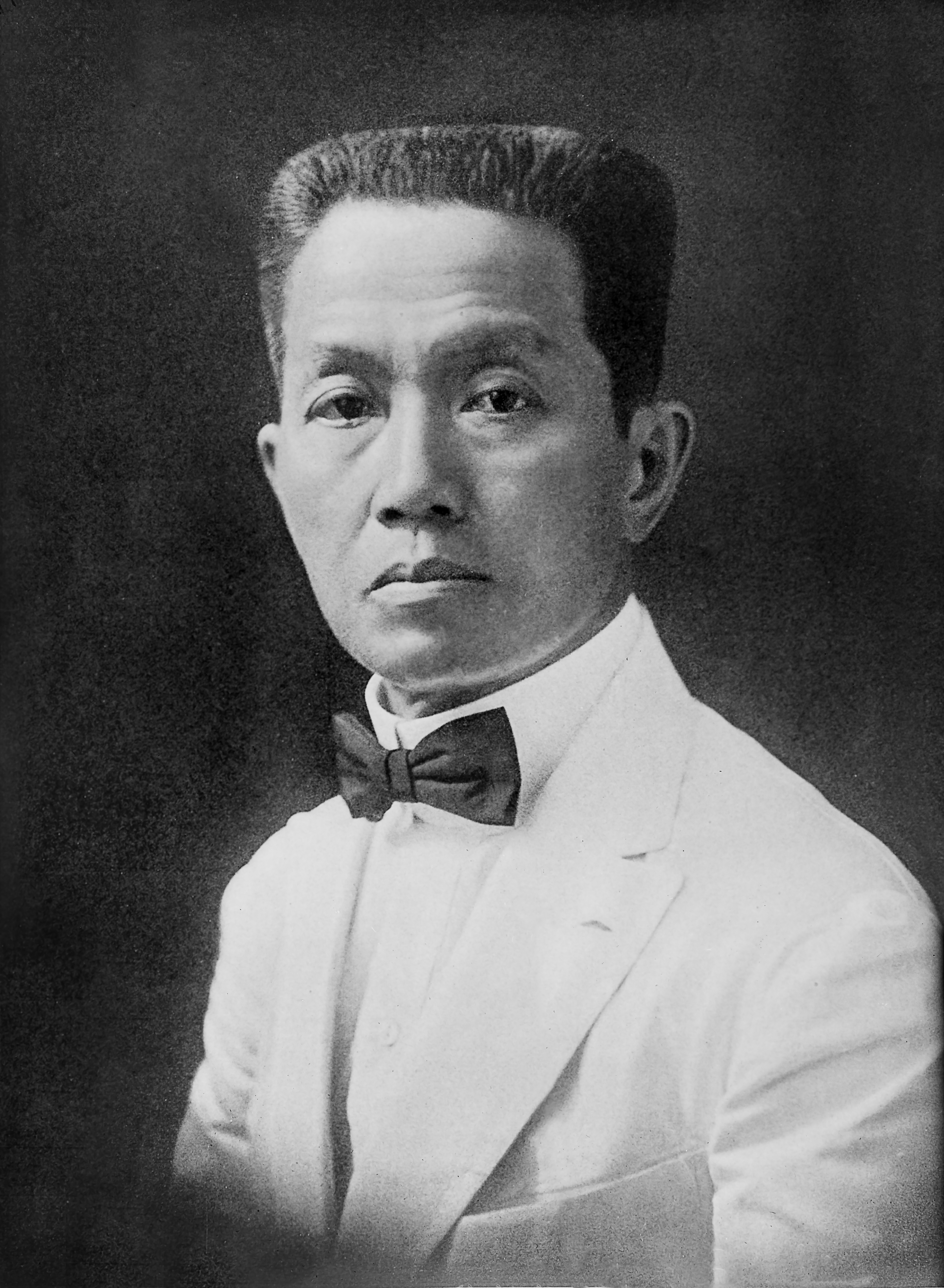
Emilio Aguinaldo

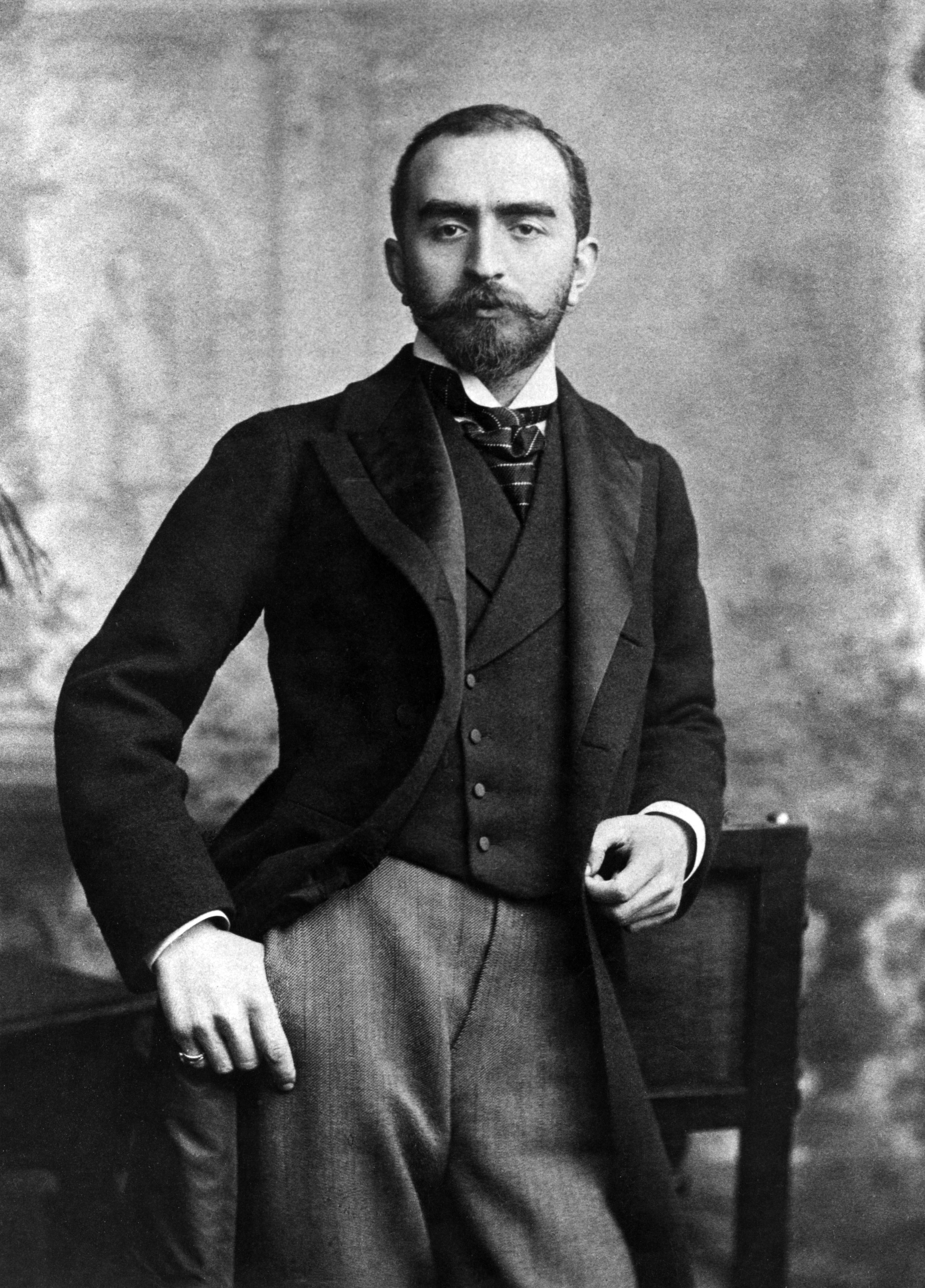
Calouste Gulbenkian

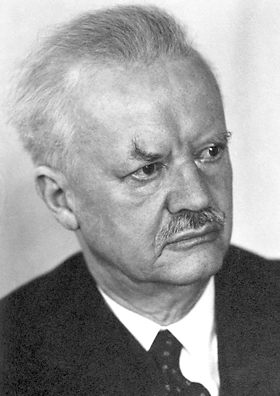
Hans Spemann

- January 6 – Edith Anne Stoney, Irish physicist (d. 1938)
- January 9 – Grigori Rasputin, Russian mystic (d. 1916)
- January 11 – Carl Theodore Vogelgesang, American admiral (d. 1927)
- January 13 – Emanuele Filiberto, 2nd Duke of Aosta, Italian general, Marshal of Italy (d. 1931)
- January 15 – Stanisław Wyspiański, Polish dramatist, poet, painter and architect (d. 1907)
- January 21 – Agnelo de Souza, Portuguese Roman Catholic priest, missionary and saint (d. 1927)
- January 22 – José Vicente de Freitas, Portuguese colonel and politician, 97th Prime Minister of Portugal (d. 1952)
- January 24
  - Ernest Broșteanu, Romanian general (d. 1932)
  - Yoshinori Shirakawa, Japanese general (d. 1932)
- January 25 – Max Hoffmann, German general (d. 1927)
- February 11
  - Helene Kröller-Müller, Dutch museum founder, patron of the arts (d. 1939)
  - Else Lasker-Schüler, German-born poet, author (d. 1945)
- February 14 – Charles Thomson Rees Wilson, Scottish physicist, Nobel laureate (d. 1959)
- February 26 – Nadezhda Krupskaya, Russian Marxist revolutionary, Vladimir Lenin's wife (d. 1939)
- February 27 – Alice Hamilton, American physician (d. 1970)
- February 28 – William V. Pratt, American admiral (d. 1957)
- March 3
  - Michael von Faulhaber, German cardinal, archbishop (d. 1952)
  - Henry Wood, British conductor (d. 1944)
- March 12 – George Forbes, New Zealand Prime Minister, first leader of the New Zealand National Party (d. 1947)
- March 14 – Algernon Blackwood, English writer (d. 1951)
- March 15 – Stanisław Wojciechowski, 2nd President of the Republic of Poland (d. 1953)
- March 18 – Neville Chamberlain, Prime Minister of the United Kingdom (d. 1940)
- March 22 – Emilio Aguinaldo, 1st President of the Philippines (d. 1964)
- March 23 – Calouste Gulbenkian, British-Armenian businessman and philanthropist (d. 1955)
- March 29 – Edwin Lutyens, British architect (d. 1944)

=== April–June ===
- April 2 – Hughie Jennings, American baseball player (d. 1928)
- April 4 – Mary Colter, American architect (d. 1958)
- April 8
  - Harvey Cushing, American neurosurgeon (d. 1939)
  - Ignatius Maloyan, Armenian Eastern Catholic archbishop and blessed (d. 1915)
- April 10 – Signe Bergman, Swedish suffragist (d. 1960)
- April 11 – Gustav Vigeland, Norwegian sculptor (d. 1943)
- April 12 – Henri Désiré Landru, French serial killer (executed 1922)
- May 3 – Warren Terhune, United States Navy Commander, 13th Governor of American Samoa (d. 1920)
- May 5 – Hans Pfitzner, German composer (d. 1949)
- May 9 – Tyrone Power Sr., English-born American actor (d. 1931)
- May 12 – Carl Schuhmann, German athlete (d. 1946)
- May 13 – Bob Dalton, Wild Western outlaw (d. 1892)
- May 14 – Percy Abbott, Australian politician (d. 1940)
- May 18
  - Rupprecht, Crown Prince of Bavaria, Bavarian military leader, last Bavarian crown prince (d. 1955)
  - Lucy Beaumont, English actress (d. 1937)
- May 20 – John Stone Stone, American physicist, inventor (d. 1943)
- May 24 – Ivan Aguéli, Swedish wandering Sufi, artist (d. 1917)
- May 28 – Hugo Meurer, German admiral (d. 1960)
- May 30 – Giulio Douhet, Italian general, air power theorist (d. 1930)
- June 17 – Flora Finch, English-born comedian (d. 1940)
- June 24 – Prince George of Greece and Denmark, high commissioner of the Cretan State (d. 1957)
- June 27
  - Emma Goldman, Russian-born anarchist (d. 1940)
  - Hans Spemann, German embryologist, recipient of the Nobel Prize in Physiology or Medicine (d. 1941)

=== July–September ===
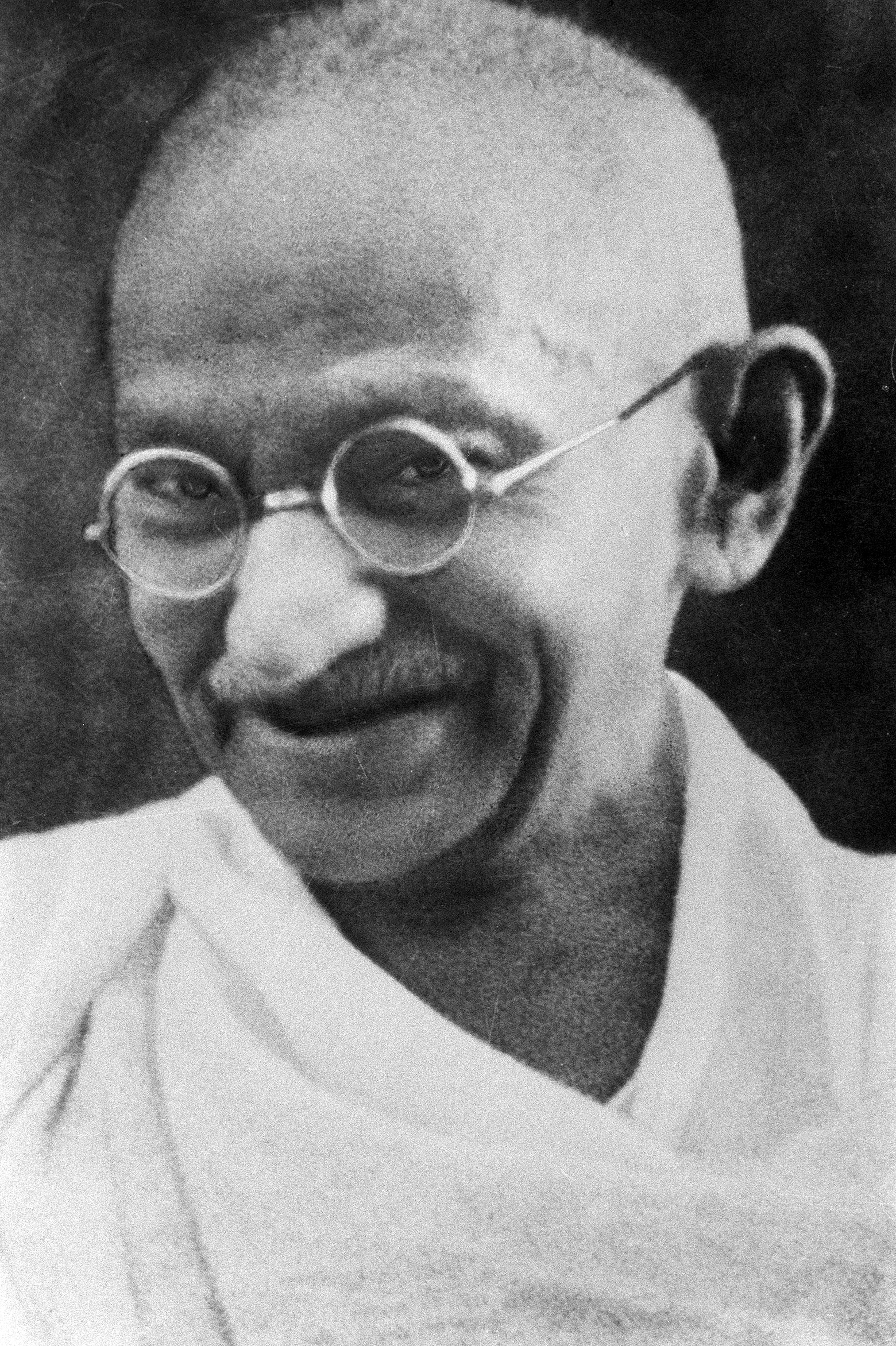
Mohandas Gandhi

Victor Emmanuel III

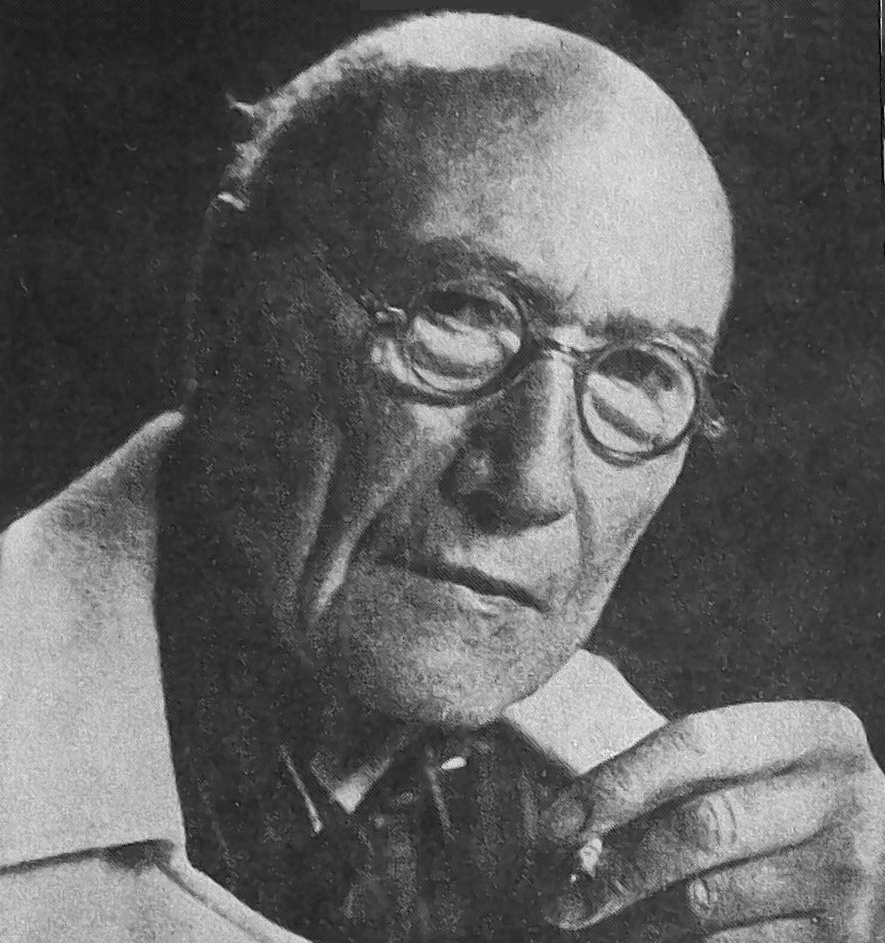
André Gide

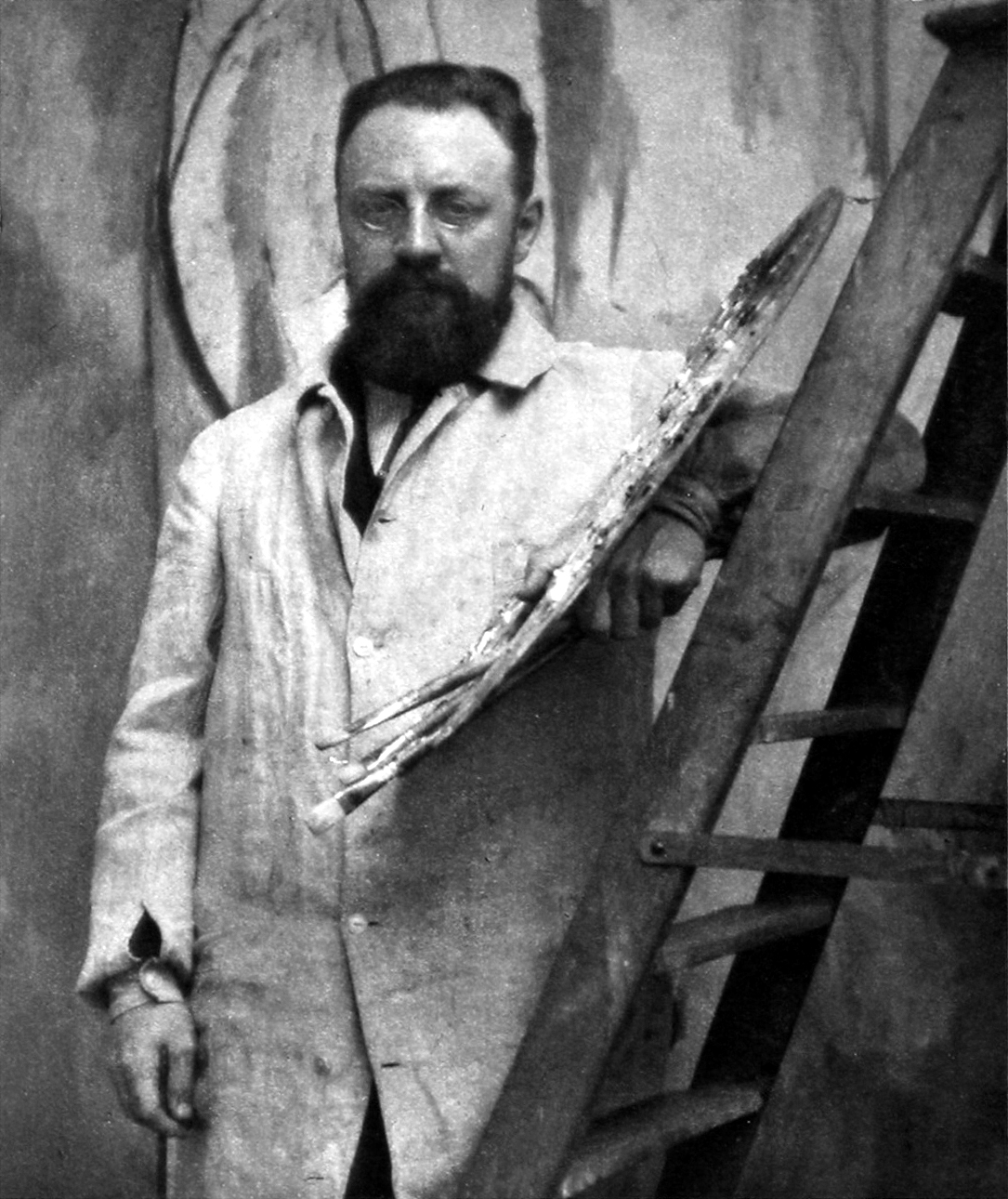
Henri Matisse

- July 11 – Pío Valenzuela, Filipino doctor, patriot (d. 1956)
- July 19 – Xenophon Stratigos, Greek general (d. 1927)
- July 30 – Cristóbal Magallanes Jara, Mexican Roman Catholic priest, martyr and saint (d. 1927)
- August 11 – Hale Holden, president of Chicago, Burlington and Quincy Railroad (d. 1940)
- August 13 – Paul Behncke, German admiral (d. 1937)
- August 16 – Mignon Talbot, American paleontologist (d. 1950)
- September 2 – Anna DeCosta Banks, American nurse (d. 1930)
- September 3 – Fritz Pregl, Austrian chemist, Nobel Prize laureate (d. 1930)
- September 6 – Felix Salten, Austrian author and critic (d. 1945)
- September 17 – Christian Lous Lange, Norwegian pacifist, recipient of the Nobel Peace Prize (d. 1938)
- September 19 – Ben Turpin, American actor and comedian (d. 1940)
- September 23 – Mary Mallon (Typhoid Mary), first known (in the United States) asymptomatic carrier of the pathogen associated with typhoid fever (d. 1938)
- September 26 – Winsor McCay, American cartoonist, animator (d. 1934)

=== October–December ===
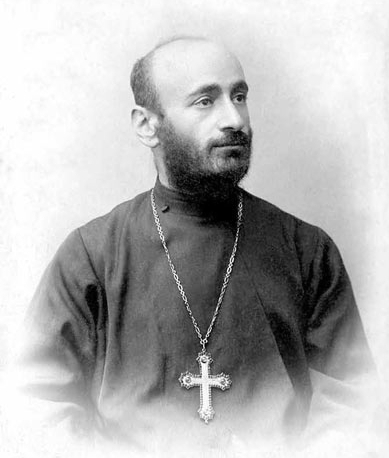
Komitas

- October 2 – Mahatma Gandhi, Indian political leader, Father of the Nation (d. 1948)
- October 8 – Komitas, Armenian composer, Father of Armenian national school of music (d. 1935)
- October 18 – Johannes Linnankoski, Finnish author (d. 1913)
- October 21 – William Dodd, American historian, diplomat (d. 1940)
- October 25 – John Heisman, American football coach (d. 1936)
- October 26 – Washington Luís, 13th President of Brazil (d. 1957)
- October 31 – William A. Moffett, American admiral (d. 1933)
- November 10 – Wayne Wheeler, American temperance movement leader (d. 1927)
- November 11 – Victor Emmanuel III, King of Italy (d. 1947)
- November 20 – Herbert Tudor Buckland, British Arts and Crafts architect (d. 1951)
- November 22 – André Gide, French writer, Nobel laureate (d. 1951)
- November 24 – Óscar Carmona, President of Portugal (d. 1951)
- November 25 – Herbert Greenfield, Premier of Alberta, Canada (d. 1949)
- November 30 – Gustaf Dalén, Swedish physicist, Nobel laureate (d. 1937)
- December 5 – Ellis Parker Butler, American humorist (d. 1937)
- December 16 – Hristo Tatarchev, Bulgarian revolutionary, leader of the revolutionary movement in Macedonia and Eastern Thrace (d. 1952)
- December 20 – Charley Grapewin, American vaudeville performer, stage and film actor (d. 1956)
- December 22 – Edwin Arlington Robinson, American poet (d. 1935)
- December 24 – Henriette Roland Holst, Dutch poet, socialist (d. 1952)
- December 30 – Stephen Leacock, British-Canadian author, economist (d. 1944)
- December 31 – Henri Matisse, French painter (d. 1954)

== Deaths ==
1860

=== January–June ===
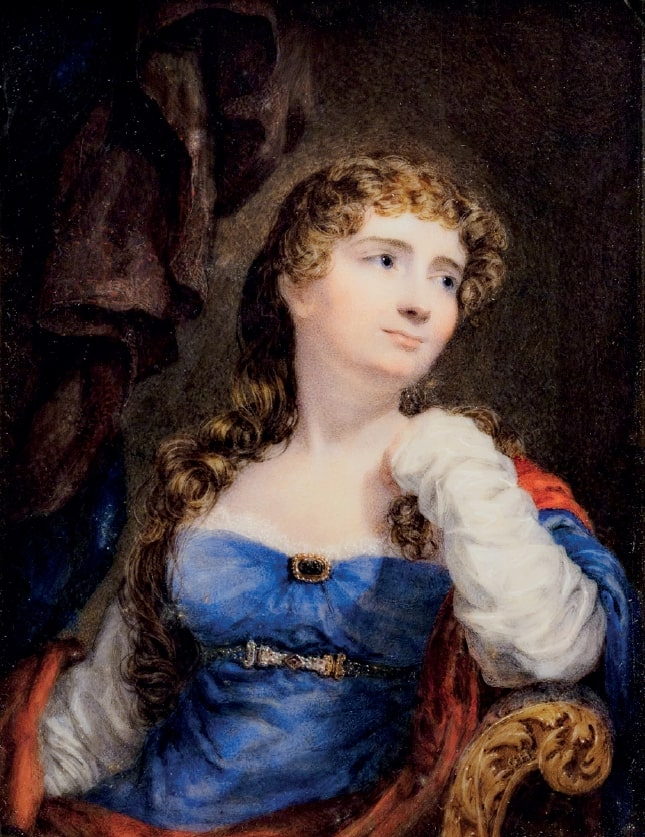
Anne Isabella Milbanke

- January 1 – Thomas Hobbes Scott, English clergyman (b. 1783)
- January 5 – John Neumann, Saint and Roman Catholic Bishop of Philadelphia (b. 1811)
- January 10 – Ezequiel Zamora, leader of the Federalist Army in Venezuela (b. 1817)
- January 13 – William Mason, American politician (b. 1786)
- January 18 – John Nelson (lawyer), American lawyer (b. 1791)
- January 27
  - János Bolyai, Hungarian mathematician (b. 1802)
  - Thomas Brisbane, Scottish astronomer (b. 1773)
- January 29 –
  - Ernst Moritz Arndt, German poet and author (b. 1769)
  - Stéphanie de Beauharnais, Grand Duchess of Baden (b. 1789)
- February 29 – George Bridgetower, Afro-Polish violinist (b. 1778)
- March 6 – Justus Johann Friedrich Dotzauer, German cellist, composer (b. 1783)
- March 14 – Carl Ritter von Ghega, Albanian-born Venetian road engineer (b. 1802)
- March 17 – Anna Brownell Jameson, British art historian (b. 1794)
- March 25 – James Braid, Scottish surgeon (b. 1795)
- May 1 – Anders Sandøe Ørsted, 3rd Prime Minister of Denmark (b. 1778)
- May 10 – Theodore Parker, American preacher, Transcendentalist, and abolitionist (b. 1810)
- May 12 – Sir Charles Barry, English architect (b. 1795)
- May 21 – Phineas Gage, improbable American head injury survivor (b. 1823)
- June 26 – George Montgomery White, American politician (b. 1828)
- June 30 – Gotthilf Heinrich von Schubert, German naturalist (b. 1780)

=== July–December ===
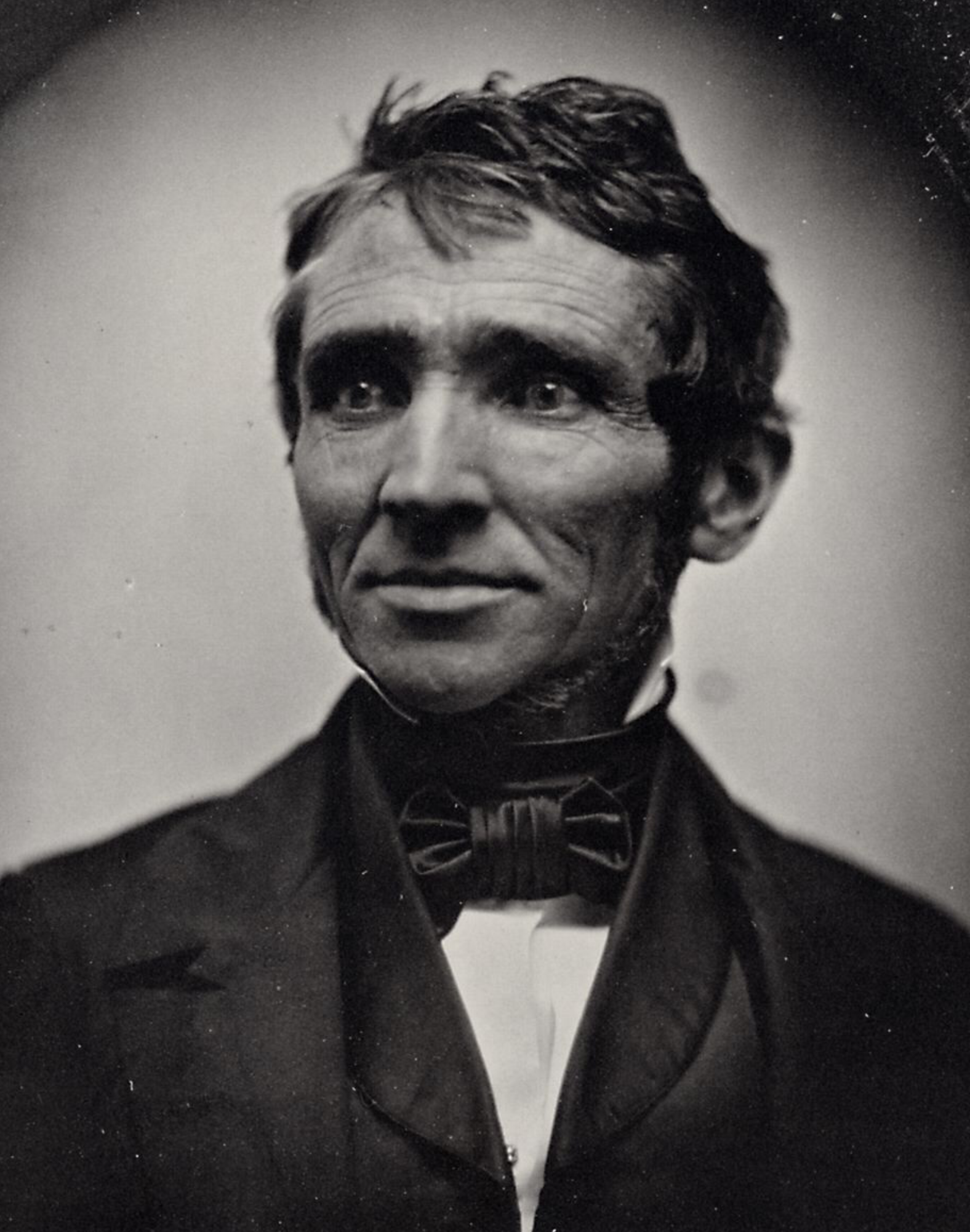
Charles Goodyear

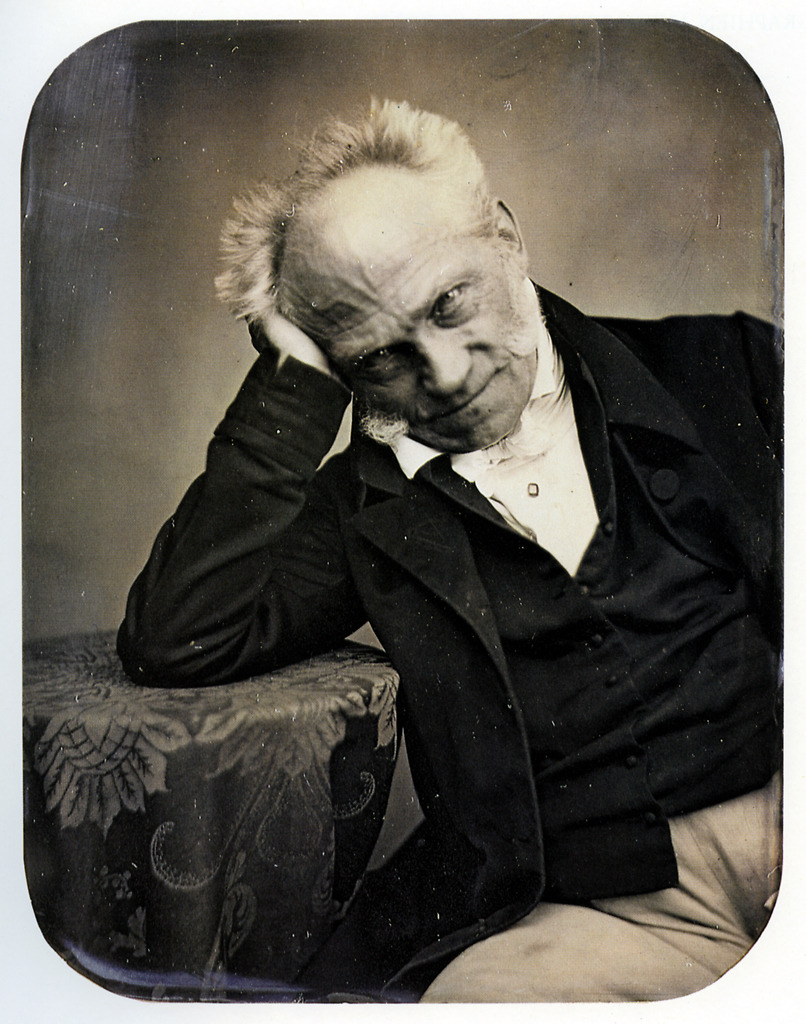
Arthur Schopenhauer

- July 1 – Charles Goodyear, American inventor (b. 1800)
- August 25 – Johan Ludvig Heiberg, Danish poet and critic (born 1791)
- September 12 – William Walker, American filibuster who was briefly President of Nicaragua (executed) (b. 1824)
- September 21 – Arthur Schopenhauer, German philosopher (b. 1788)
- October 12 – Sir Harry Smith, English soldier, military commander (b. 1787)
- October 25 – Alexander Maconchie, Scottish penal reformer (b. 1787)
- October 31 – Thomas Cochrane, 10th Earl of Dundonald, British admiral (b. 1775)
- November 1 – Alexandra Feodorovna (Charlotte of Prussia), Empress Consort of Russian Emperor Nicholas I (b. 1798)
- December 2 – Ferdinand Christian Baur, German theologian (b. 1792)
- December 14 – George Hamilton-Gordon, 4th Earl of Aberdeen, Prime Minister of the United Kingdom (b. 1784)

=== Date unknown ===
- Dai Xi, Chinese painter (b. 1801)

1861

=== January–June ===
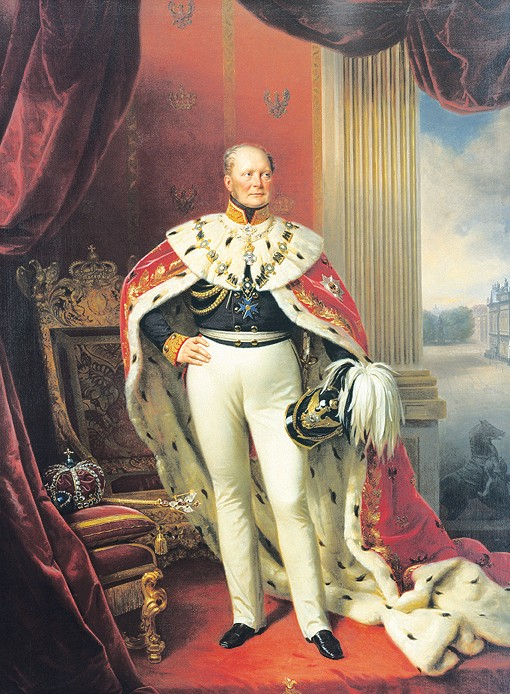
Frederick William IV of Prussia

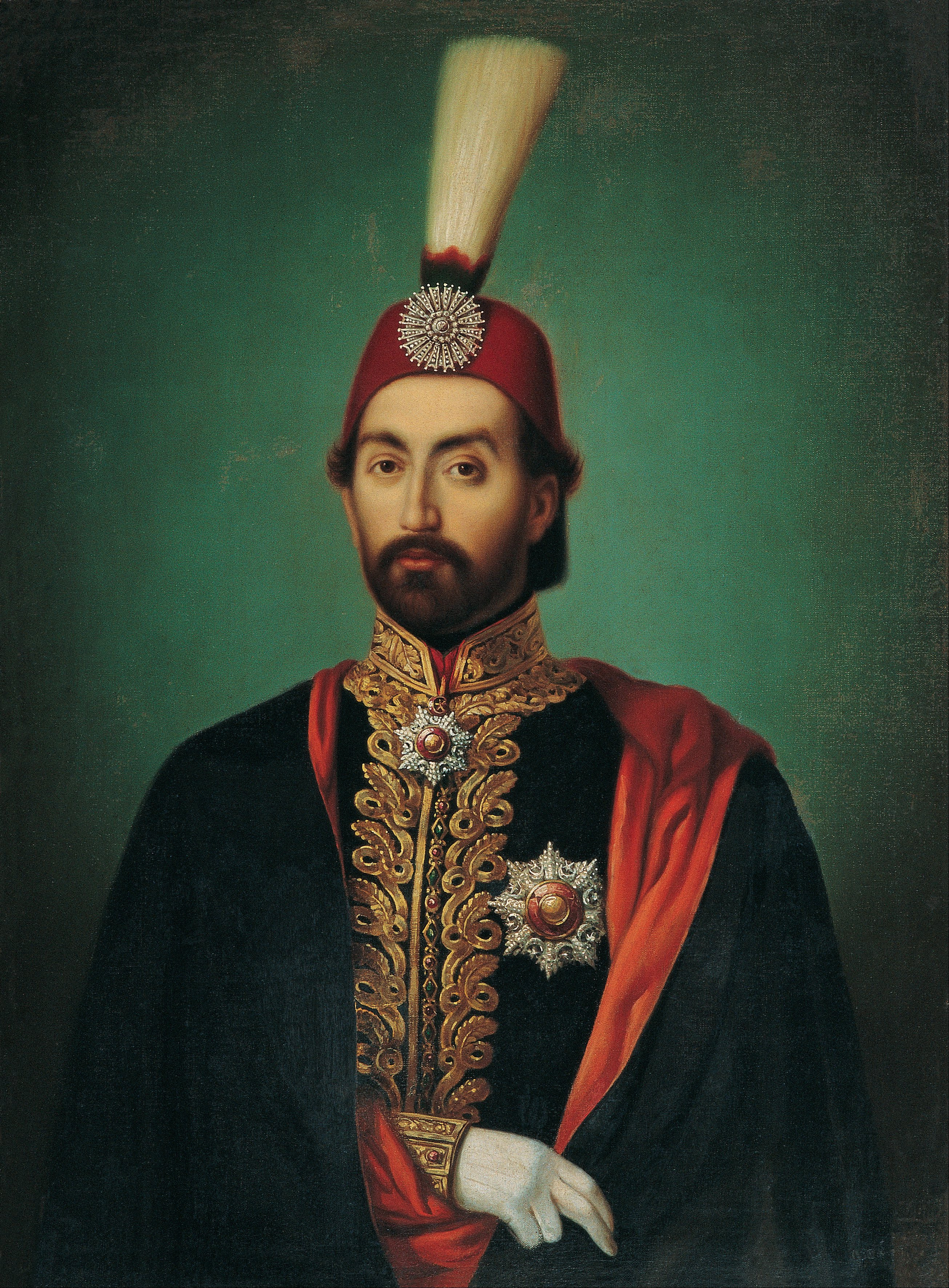
Abdülmecid I

- January 2 – King Frederick William IV of Prussia (b. 1795)
- January 17 – Lola Montez, Irish-born dancer, mistress of King Ludwig I of Bavaria (b. 1821)
- January 19 – Albert Niemann, German chemist (b. 1834)
- February 5 – Pierre Bosquet, French general, Marshal of France (b. 1810)
- February 26 – Wojciech Chrzanowski, Polish general (b. 1793)
- March 10 – Taras Shevchenko, Ukrainian poet (b. 1814)
- March 16 – Princess Victoria, Duchess of Kent and Strathearn, mother of Queen Victoria (b. 1786)
- April 8 – Elisha Otis, American engineer, Founder of Otis (b. 1811)
- April 15 – Isaiah Stillman, U.S. Army Major in the Black Hawk War (b. 1793)
- May 29 – Joachim Lelewel, Polish nationalist historian (b. 1786)
- June 3 – Stephen A. Douglas, American senator from Illinois, Democratic presidential candidate (b. 1813)
- June 6 – Camillo Benso, Count of Cavour, 1st prime minister of Italy (b. 1810)
- June 13 – Richard Lawrence, failed assassin of Andrew Jackson (b. 1800)
- June 25 – Abdülmecid I, Ottoman sultan (b. 1823)
- June 26 – Pavel Jozef Šafárik, Slovak philologist (b. 1795)
- June 29 – Elizabeth Barrett Browning, English poet (b. 1806)

=== July–December ===
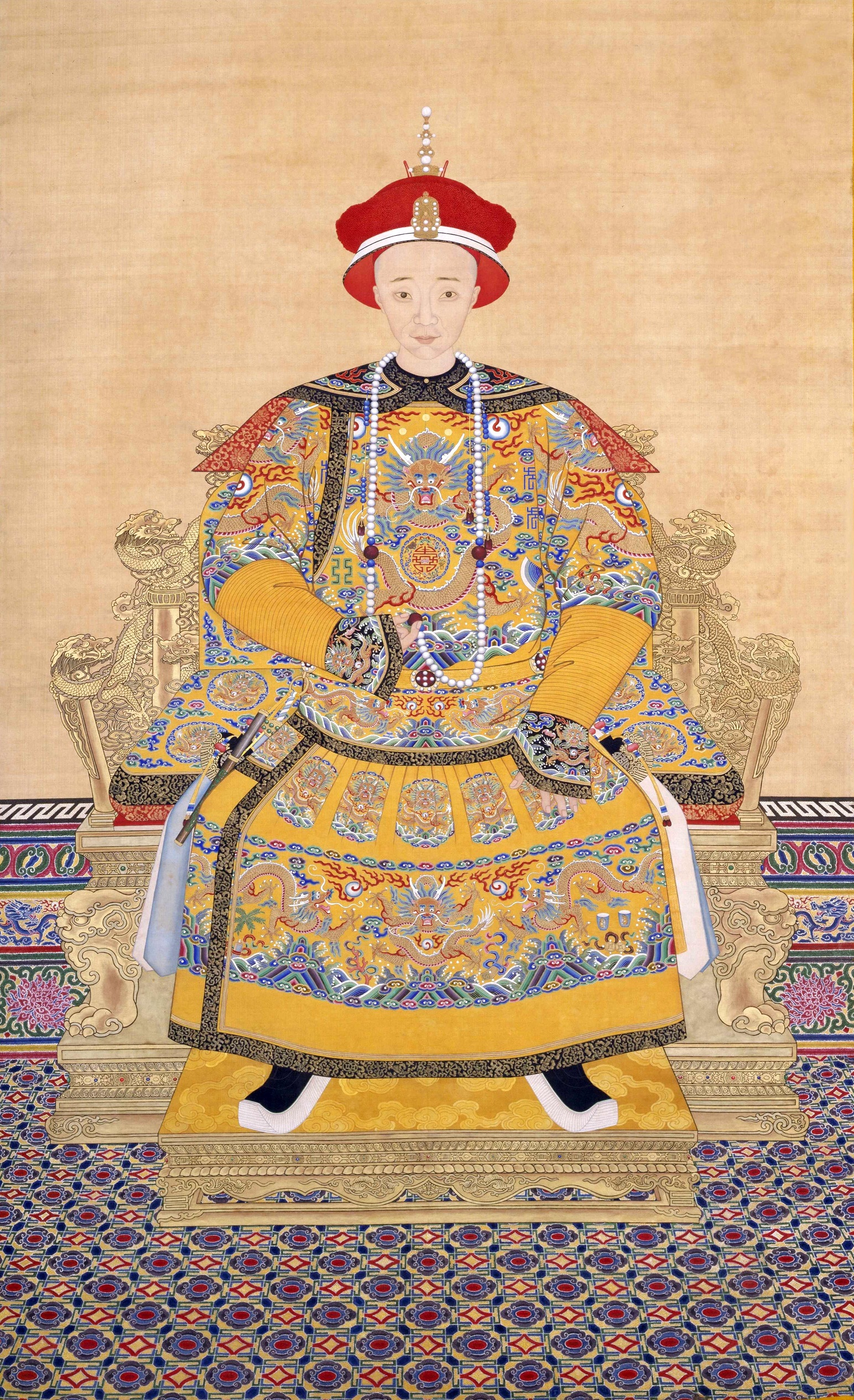
Xianfeng Emperor

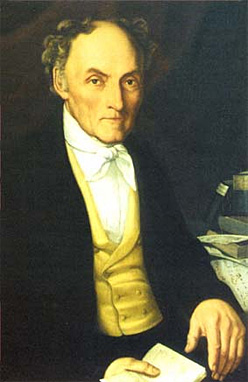
Ernst Anschütz

- July 22 – Barnard Elliott Bee Jr., Confederate general (b. 1824)
- July 25 – Jonas Furrer, member of the Swiss Federal Council (b. 1805)
- August 10 – Nathaniel Lyon, first Union Army General to die in combat in the American Civil War (b. 1818)
- August 12 – Eliphalet Remington, American gunsmith, founder of Remington Arms (b. 1793)
- August 17 – Alcée Louis la Branche, American politician (b. 1806)
- August 22 – Xianfeng Emperor, 9th emperor of the Qing dynasty (b. 1831)
- August 24 – Pierre Berthier, French geologist (b. 1782)
- August 28 – William Lyon Mackenzie, Scottish journalist, 1st Mayor of Toronto (b. 1795)
- September 7 – Willie Person Mangum, American politician (b. 1792)
- October 4 – Archibald Montgomerie, 13th Earl of Eglinton, British politician (b. 1812)
- October 5 – Antoni Melchior Fijałkowski, Polish bishop (b. 1778)
- October 10 – Phoebe Hinsdale Brown, American hymnwriter (b. 1783)
- October 26 – Edward "Ned" Kendall, American bandleader, instrumentalist (keyed bugle) (b. 1808)
- October 31 – Guillermo (William) Miller, English-born military leader in Peru (b. 1795)
- November 7 – Isobel Gunn, Scottish business person (b. 1780)
- November 11 – King Pedro V of Portugal (b. 1837)
- November 13 – Arthur Hugh Clough, English poet (b. 1819)
- November 25 – Rahimullah, Bengali rebel leader
- December 14 – Prince Albert, husband of Queen Victoria (b. 1819)
- December 18 – Ernst Anschütz, German teacher, organist, poet and composer (b. 1780)

1862

=== January–June ===
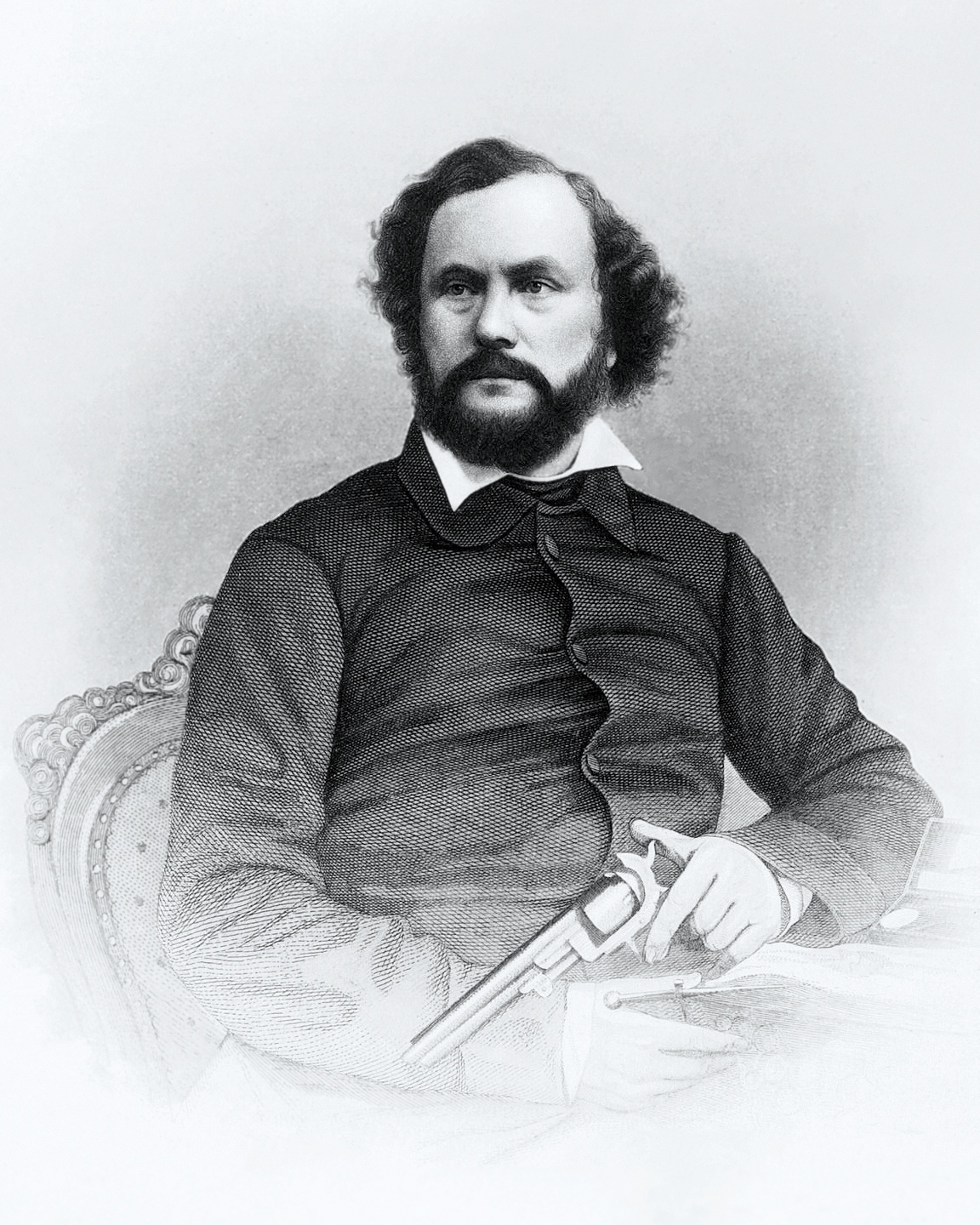
Samuel Colt

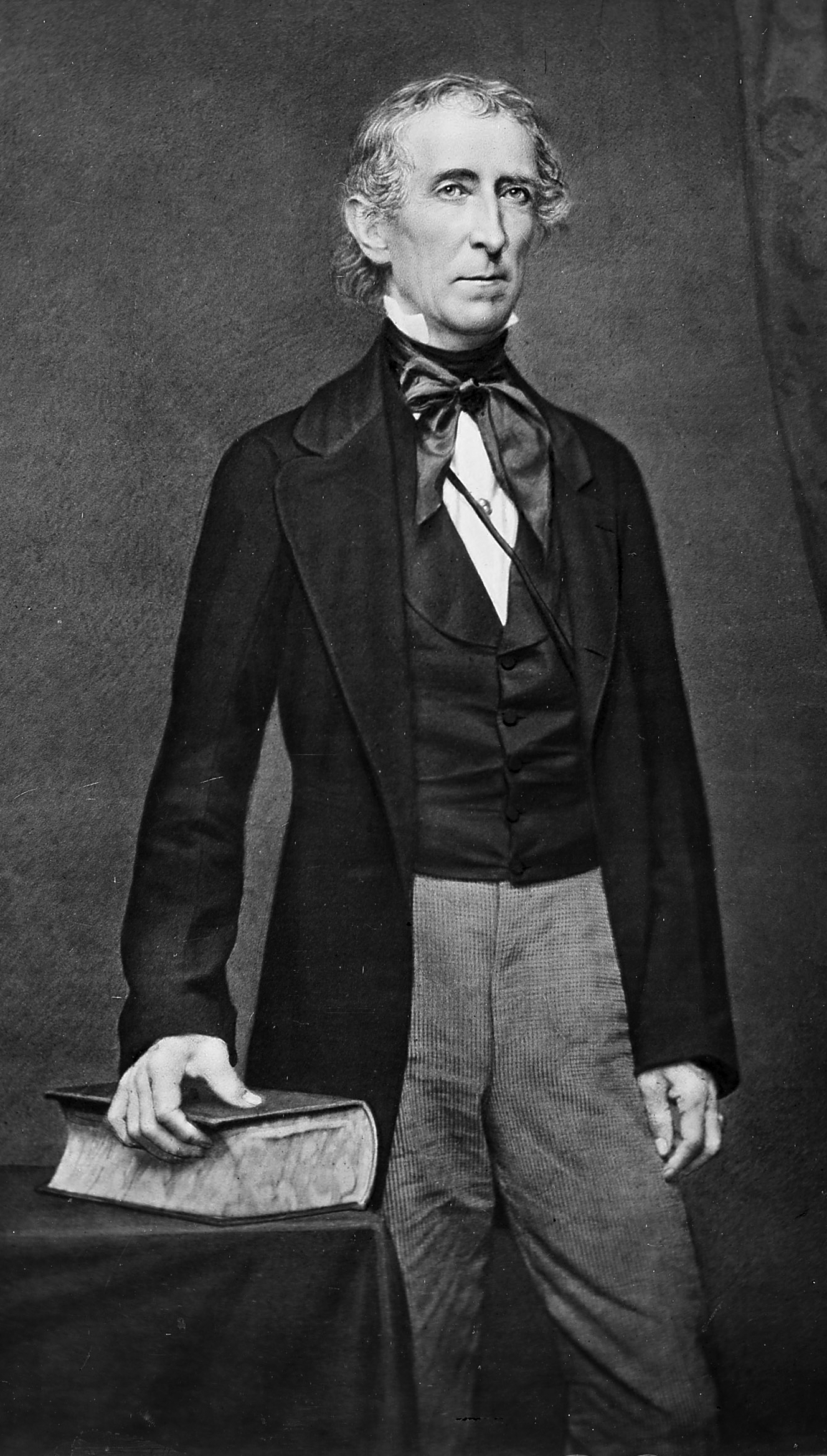
John Tyler

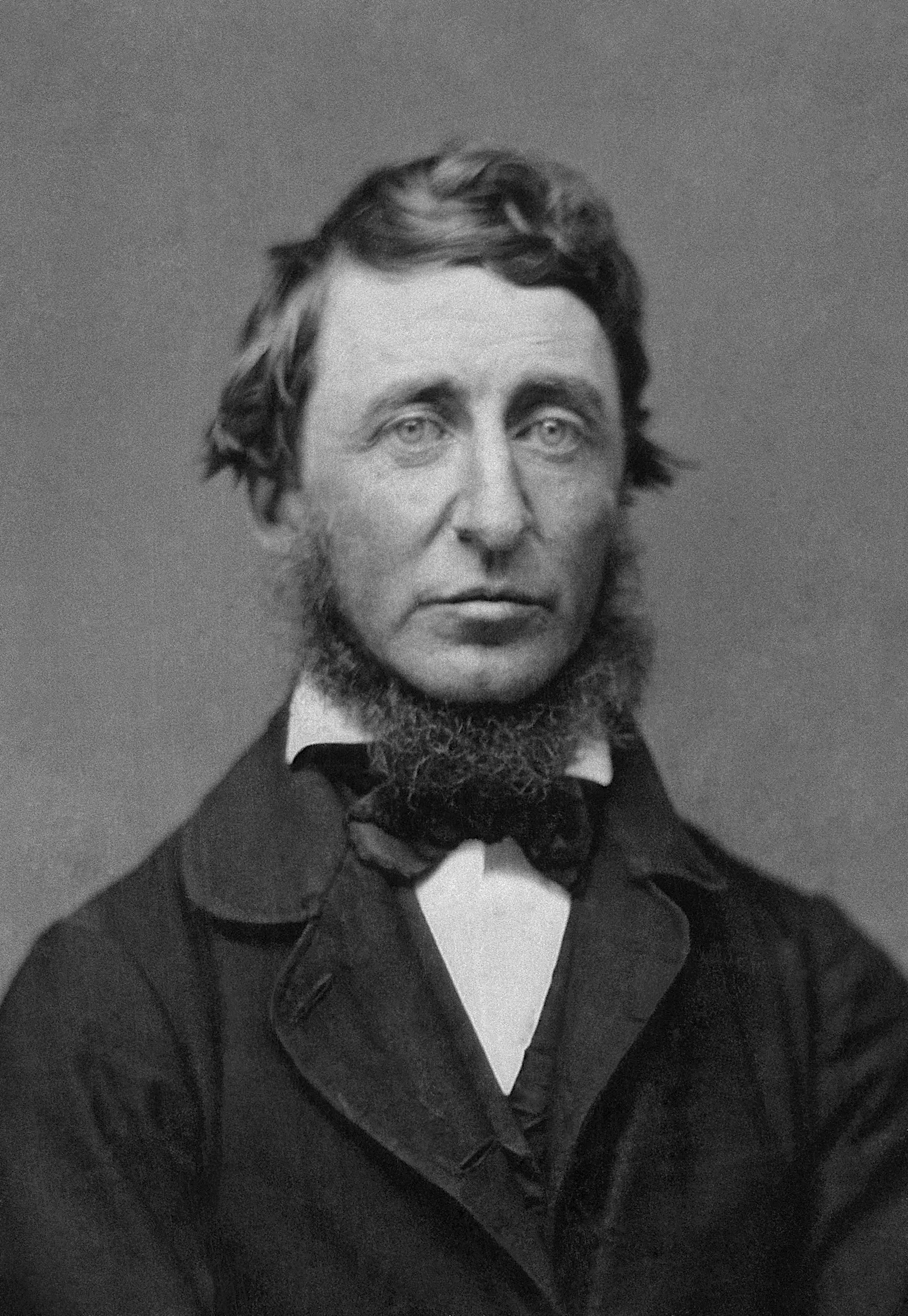
Henry David Thoreau

- January 10 – Samuel Colt, American firearms inventor (b. 1814)
- January 18 – John Tyler, 71, 10th President of the United States (b. 1790)
- January 20 – Harriet Auber, English poet (b. 1773)
- February 3 – Jean-Baptiste Biot, French physicist, astronomer and mathematician (b. 1774)
- February 7
  - Francisco de Paula Martínez de la Rosa y Berdejo, Prime Minister of Spain (b. 1787)
  - Prosper Ménière, French scientist (b. 1799)
- February 20
  - Francisco Balagtas, Filipino poet (b. 1788)
  - William Wallace "Willie" Lincoln, third son of U.S. President Abraham Lincoln and Mary Todd Lincoln (b. 1850)
- February 21 – Justinus Kerner, German physician (b. 1786)
- February 24 – Bernhard Severin Ingemann, Danish novelist, poet (b. 1789)
- February 25 – Jonathan Hine, English hosiery manufacturer (b. 1778)
- March 22 – Manuel Robles Pezuela, former President of Mexico (executed) (b. 1817)
- April 6 – Albert Sidney Johnston, American Confederate general (b. 1803)
- April 9 – John Thomas, English Victorian sculptor (b. 1813)
- April 10 – W. H. L. Wallace, American Civil War Union general (died of wounds) (b. 1821)
- April 19 – Louis P. Harvey, Governor of Wisconsin (b. 1820)
- May 6 – Henry David Thoreau, American author, philosopher (b. 1817)
- May 16 – Edward Gibbon Wakefield, English theorist of colonization (b. 1796)
- May 21 – John Drew Sr., Irish-American actor, manager (b. 1827)
- May 25 – Juana Azurduy de Padilla, South American guerrilla military leader (b. c. 1781)
- May 29
  - Henry Thomas Buckle, English historian sometimes called "the father of scientific history" (b. 1821)
  - Franciszek Mirecki, Polish composer, music conductor, and music teacher (b. 1791)
- June 3 – John Lea, American epidemiologist (b. 1782)
- June 17 – Charles Canning, 1st Earl Canning, English Viceroy of India (b. 1812)
- June 20 – Barbu Catargiu, 1st Prime Minister of Romania (b. 1807)

=== July–December ===
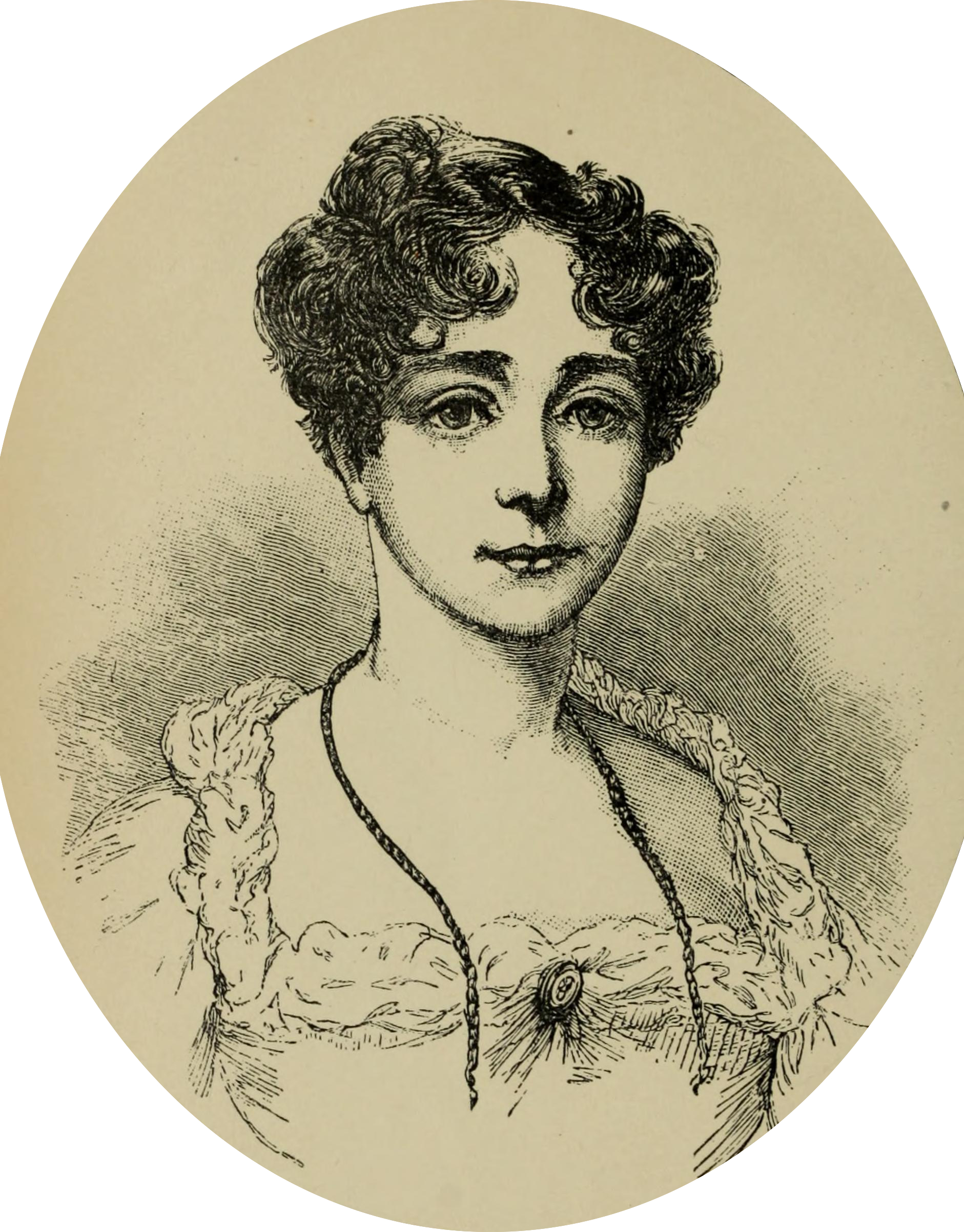
Judith Montefiore

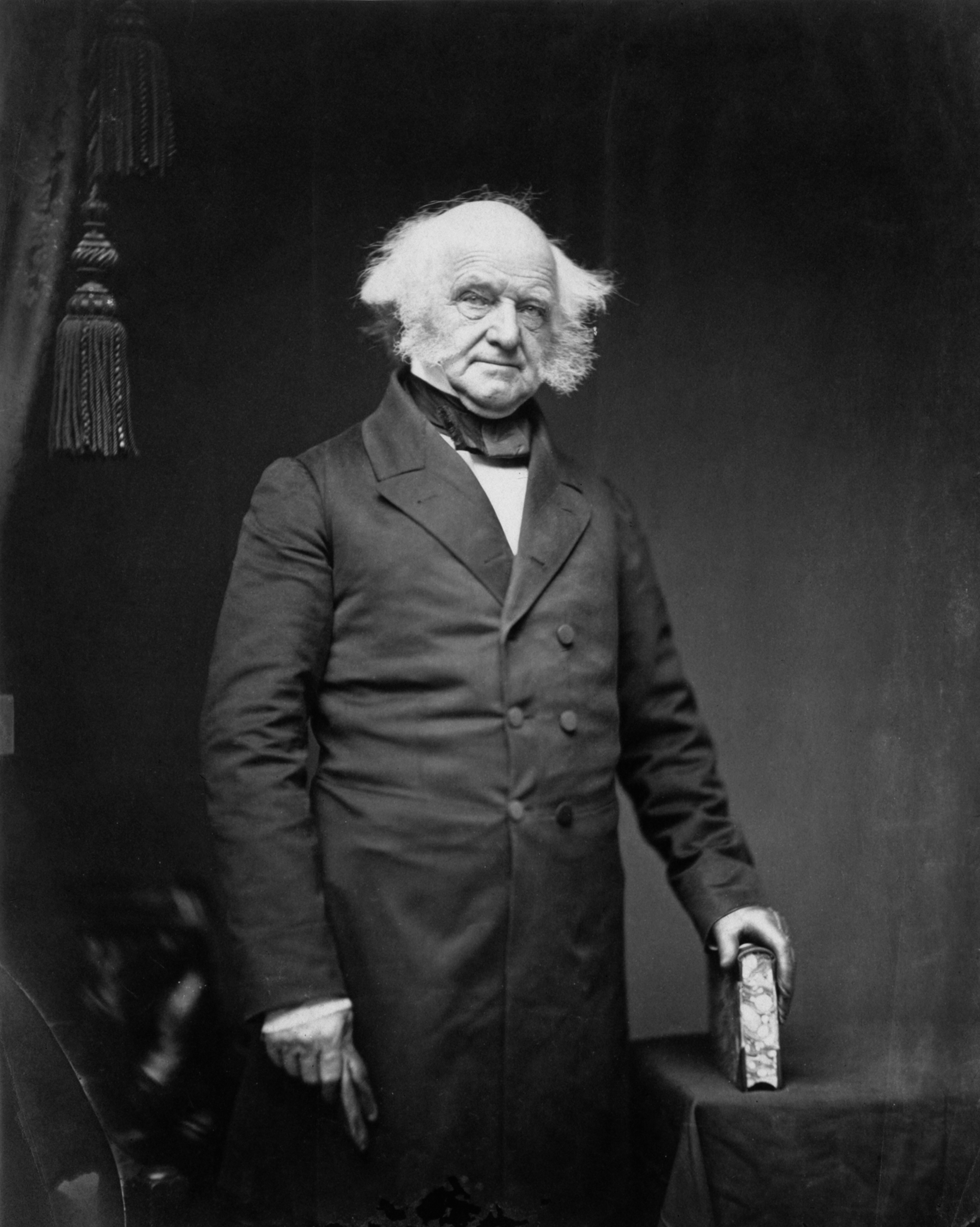
Martin Van Buren

- July 23 – José María Bocanegra, 3rd President of Mexico (b. 1787)
- July 24 – Martin Van Buren, 79, 8th President of the United States (b. 1782)
- August 18 – Simon Fraser, Canadian explorer (b. 1776)
- August 20
  - Javiera Carrera, Chilean independence fighter (b. 1771)
  - Ernst Guhl, German art historian (b. 1818)
- September 3 – Shusaku Honinbo, Japanese Go player (b. 1829)
- September 6 – John Sumner, Archbishop of Canterbury (b. 1780)
- September 10 – Carlos Antonio López, president of Paraguay (b. 1792)
- September 14 – Charles Lennox Richardson, English merchant murdered in Japan (b. 1834)
- September 24
  - Judith Montefiore, British linguist (b. 1784)
  - Anton Martin Slomšek, Slovene Roman Catholic bishop (b. 1800)
- October 8 – James Walker, Scottish engineer (b. 1781)
- October 15 – Hans Daniel Ludwig Friedrich Hassenpflug, German statesman (b. 1794)
- November 7 – Bahadur Shah II, 19th and Last mughal emperor (b. 1775)
- November 13 – Ludwig Uhland, German poet (b. 1787)
- November 17 – Mary Whitwell Hale, American school founder (b. 1810)
- December 4 – James Bennett (minister), English congregational minister (b. 1774)
- December 13 – Thomas Reade Rootes Cobb, American Confederate general (killed in action) (b. 1823)
- December 18 – Barbara Fritchie, American Civil War patriot (b. 1766)

1863

=== January–June ===
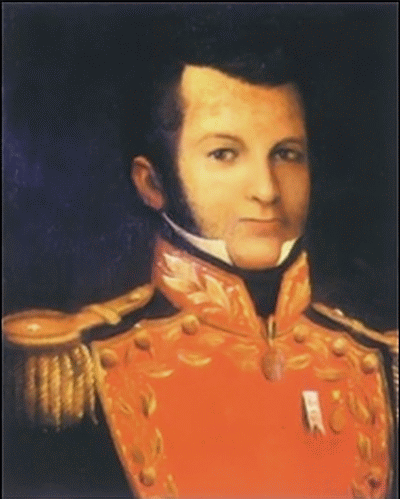
Antonio Valero de Bernabé

- January 1 – William B. Renshaw, United States Navy officer (killed in action) (b. 1816)
- February 7 – William Farquharson Burnett, British commodore (drowned) (b. 1815)
- February 10 – Emma Catherine Embury, American author (b. 1806)
- April 1 – Jakob Steiner, Swiss mathematician (b. 1796)
- April 10 – Giovanni Battista Amici, Italian astronomer, microscopist and botanist (b. 1786)
- April 21 – Sir Robert Bateson, 1st Baronet, Irish nobility (b. 1782)
- May 7 – Earl Van Dorn, American Confederate general (murdered) (b. 1820)
- May 10 – Thomas J. "Stonewall" Jackson, American Confederate general (died of wounds) (b. 1824)
- June 7 – Antonio Valero de Bernabé, Latin American liberator (b. 1790)
- June 9 – Dost Mohammad Khan, Emir of Kabul, King of Kandahar (b. 1793)
- June 24 – Sir George Elliot, British admiral (b. 1784)
- June 26 – Andrew Hull Foote, American admiral (b. 1800)

=== July–December ===
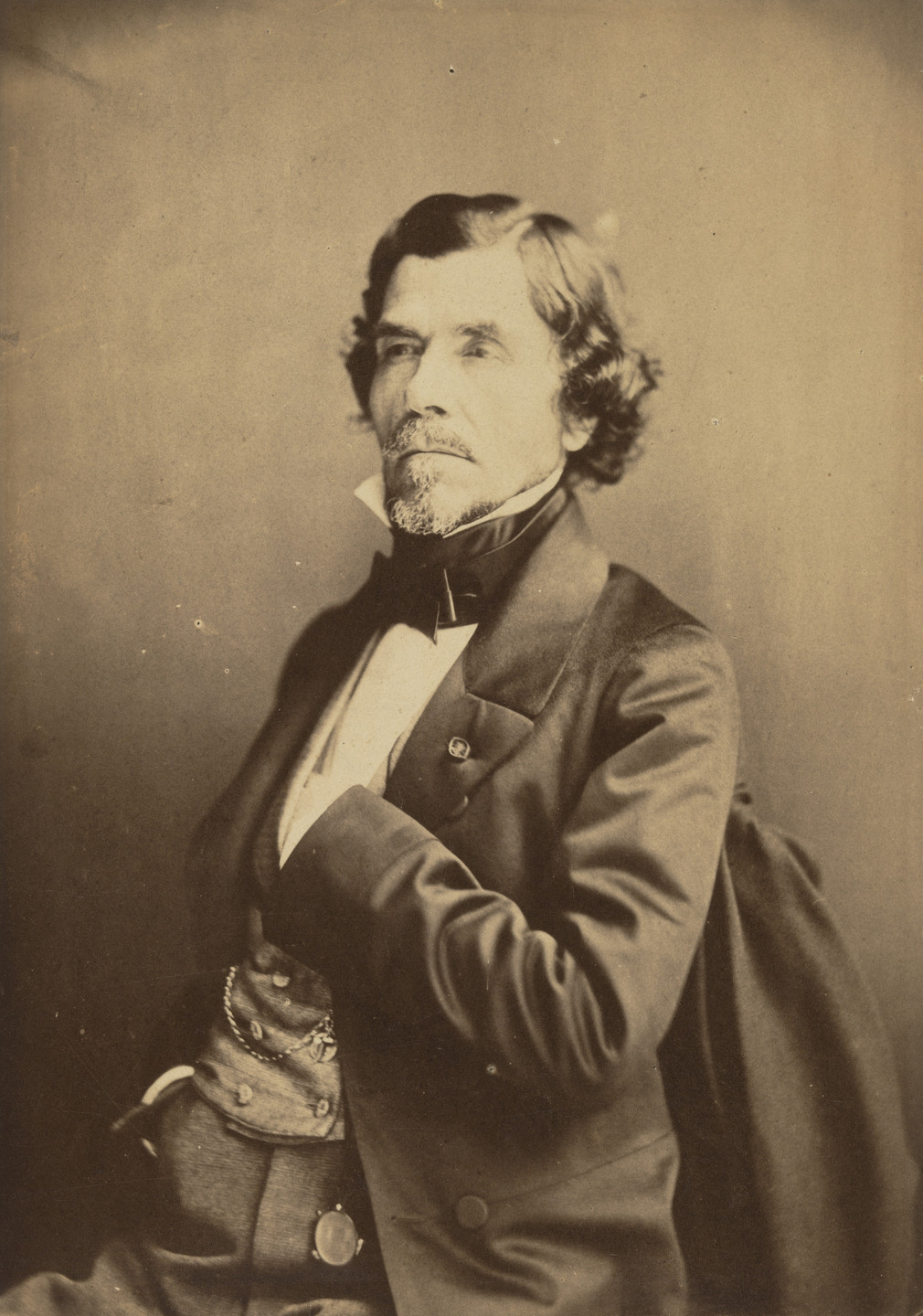
Eugène Delacroix

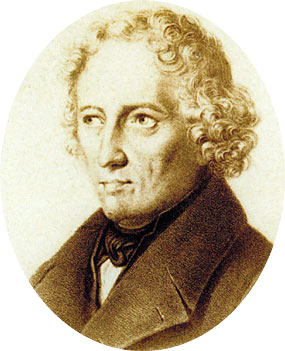
Jacob Grimm

- July 1 – John F. Reynolds, American general (killed in action) (b. 1820)
- July 5 – Lewis Armistead, American Confederate general (died of wounds) (b. 1817)
- July 10 – Clement Clarke Moore, American writer and teacher (b. 1779)
- July 18 – Robert Gould Shaw, American Union Army officer (killed in action) (b. 1837)
- July 21 – Josephine Kablick, Czech botanist and paleontologist (b. 1787)
- July 26 – Sam Houston, first President of the Republic of Texas (b. 1793)
- August 1 – Jind Kaur, Indian royal, Maharani of Punjab (b. 1817)
- August 13 – Eugène Delacroix, French painter (b. 1798)
- September 17 – Alfred de Vigny, French author (b. 1797)
- September 20 – Jacob Grimm, German folklorist (b. 1785)
- September 21 – Benjamin Hardin Helm, Confederate politician and general (died of wounds) (b. 1831)
- October 13 – Philippe Antoine d'Ornano, Marshal of France (b. 1784)
- November 2 – Theodore Judah, American railroad engineer (yellow fever) (b. 1826)
- November 13 – Ignacio Comonfort, President of Mexico 1855-1857 (killed in action) (b. 1812)
- November 15 – King Frederick VII of Denmark (b. 1808)
- December 2 – Jane Pierce, 15th First Lady of the United States (b. 1806)
- December 13 – Christian Friedrich Hebbel, German writer (b. 1813)
- December 16 – John Buford, American general (b. 1826)
- December 24 – William Makepeace Thackeray, British novelist (b. 1811)

1864

=== January–June ===
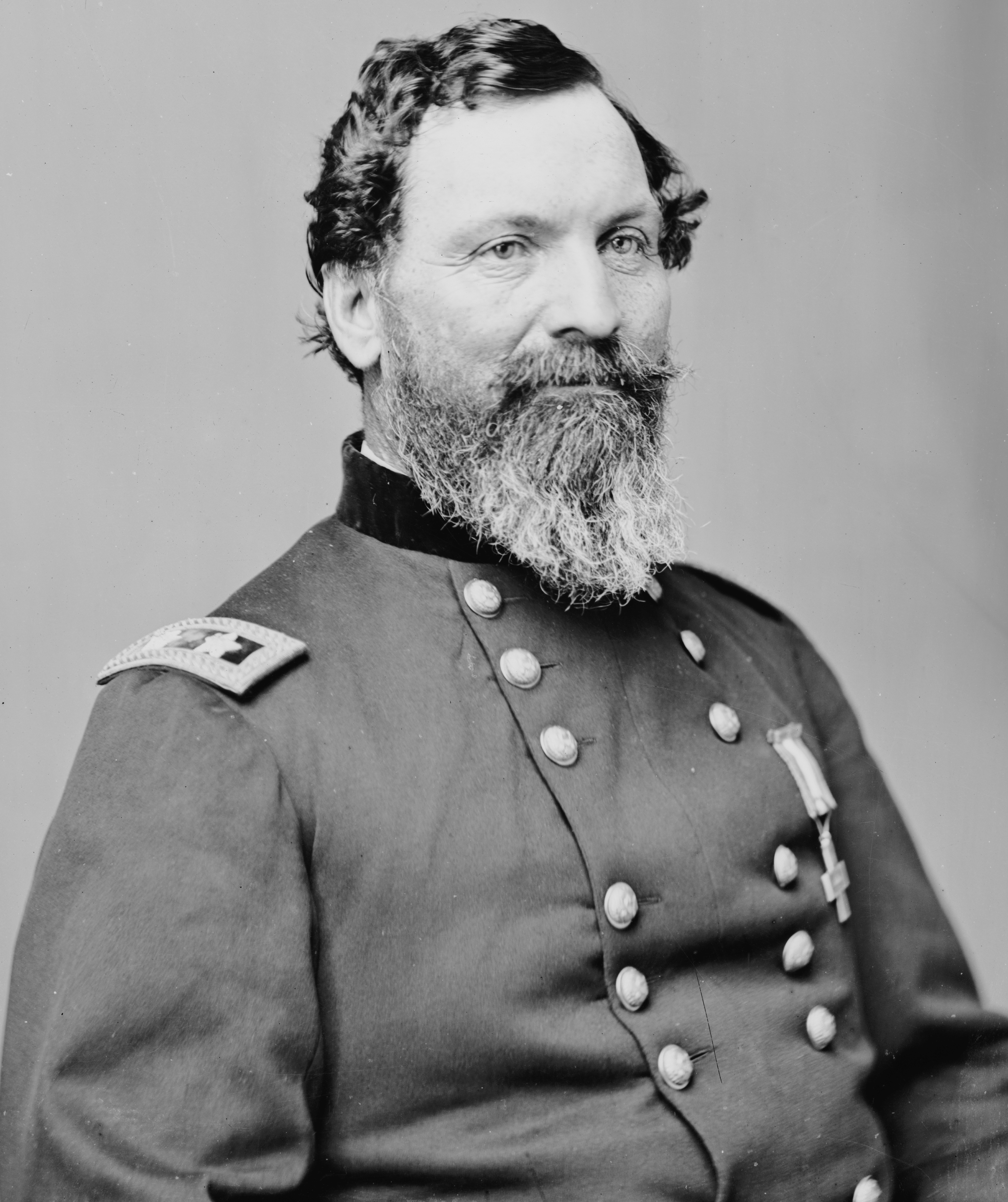
John Sedgwick

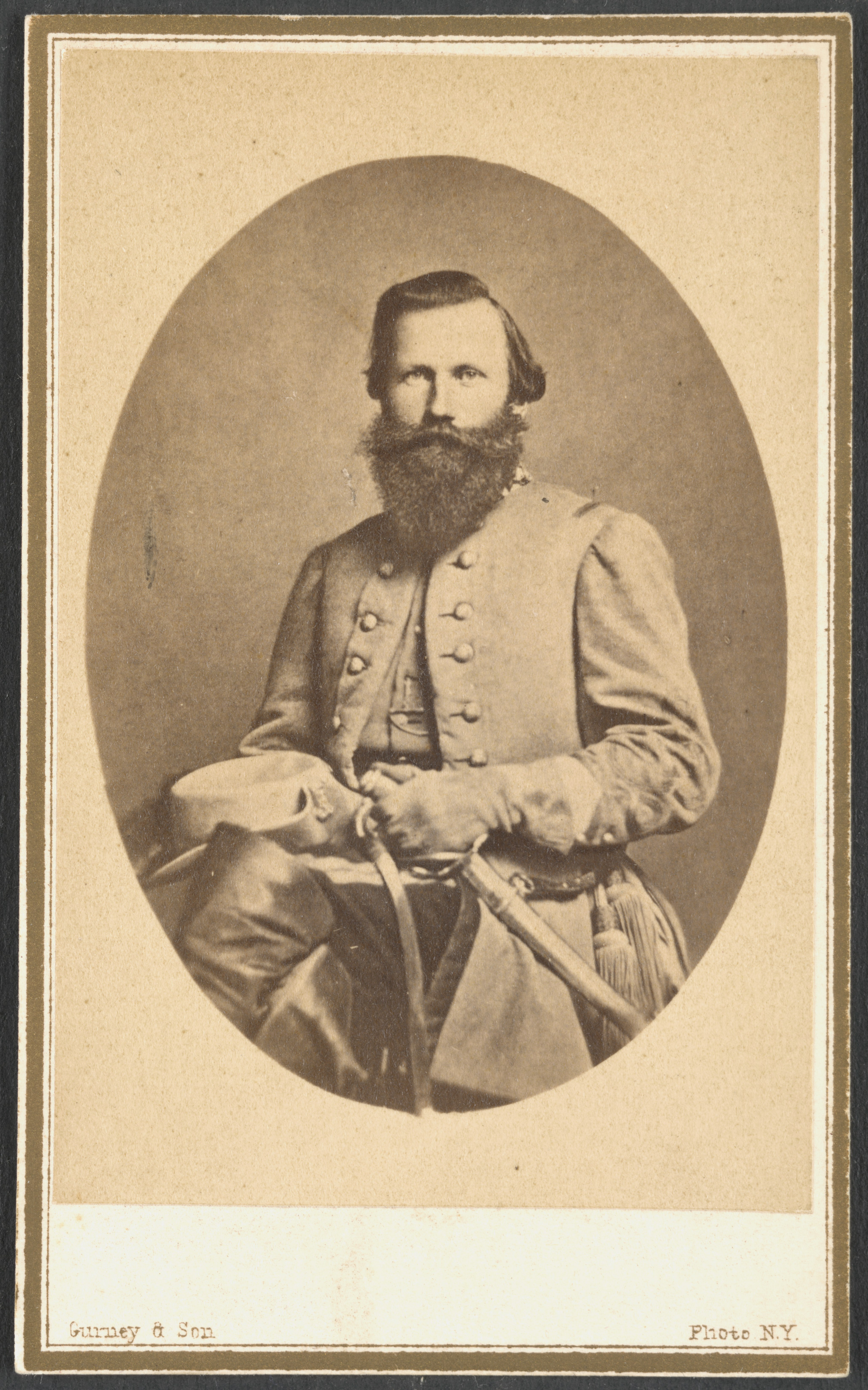
J. E. B. Stuart

- January 13 – Stephen Foster, American song composer (b. 1826)
- January 24 – Vedanayagam Sastriar, Tamil Lutheran hymnwriter and court poet in the palace of Serfoji II, the last Maratha King of Thanjavur (b. 1774)
- January 27 – Leo von Klenze, German neoclassicist architect, painter and writer (b. 1784)
- February 7 – Vuk Stefanović Karadžić, Serbian linguist, major reformer of the Serbian language (b. 1787)
- February 22 – James Sewall Reed, U.S. Army officer (in battle) (b. 1832)
- February 25 – Anna Harrison, First Lady of the United States (b. 1775)
- March 10 – King Maximilian II of Bavaria (b. 1811)
- March 28 – Princess Louise Charlotte of Denmark (b. 1789)
- April 4 – Joseph Pitty Couthouy, American naval officer (b. 1808)
- April 14 – Charles Lot Church, Nova Scotia politician (b. 1777)
- April 30 – John B. Cocke, Confederate officer (in battle) (b. c. 1833)
- May 2 – Giacomo Meyerbeer, German composer (b. 1791)
- May 5 – Elizabeth Andrew Warren, Cornish botanist, marine algolologist (b. 1786)
- May 9
  - John Sedgwick, Union general, American Civil War (b. 1813)
  - Wilhelm Wolff, German political activist (b. 1809)
- May 12 – J. E. B. Stuart, Confederate general (in battle) (b. 1833)
- May 19 – Nathaniel Hawthorne, American author (b. 1804)
- May 20 – John Clare, Northamptonshire peasant poet (b. 1793)
- June 1 – Hong Xiuquan, Chinese rebel (b. 1814)
- June 4 – Matías Ramón Mella, Dominican general (b. 1816)
- June 13 – Henryk Dembiński, Polish engineer (b. 1791)
- June 14 – Patrick Kelly, U.S. Army officer (in battle) (b. c. 1822)
- June 15 – William E. Jones, Confederate general (in battle) (b. 1824)

=== July–December ===
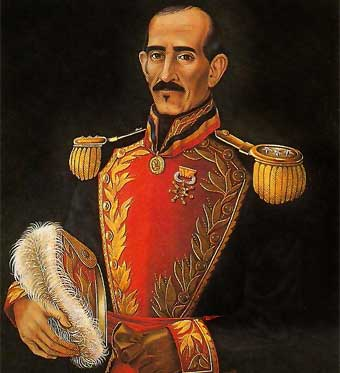
Juan José Flores

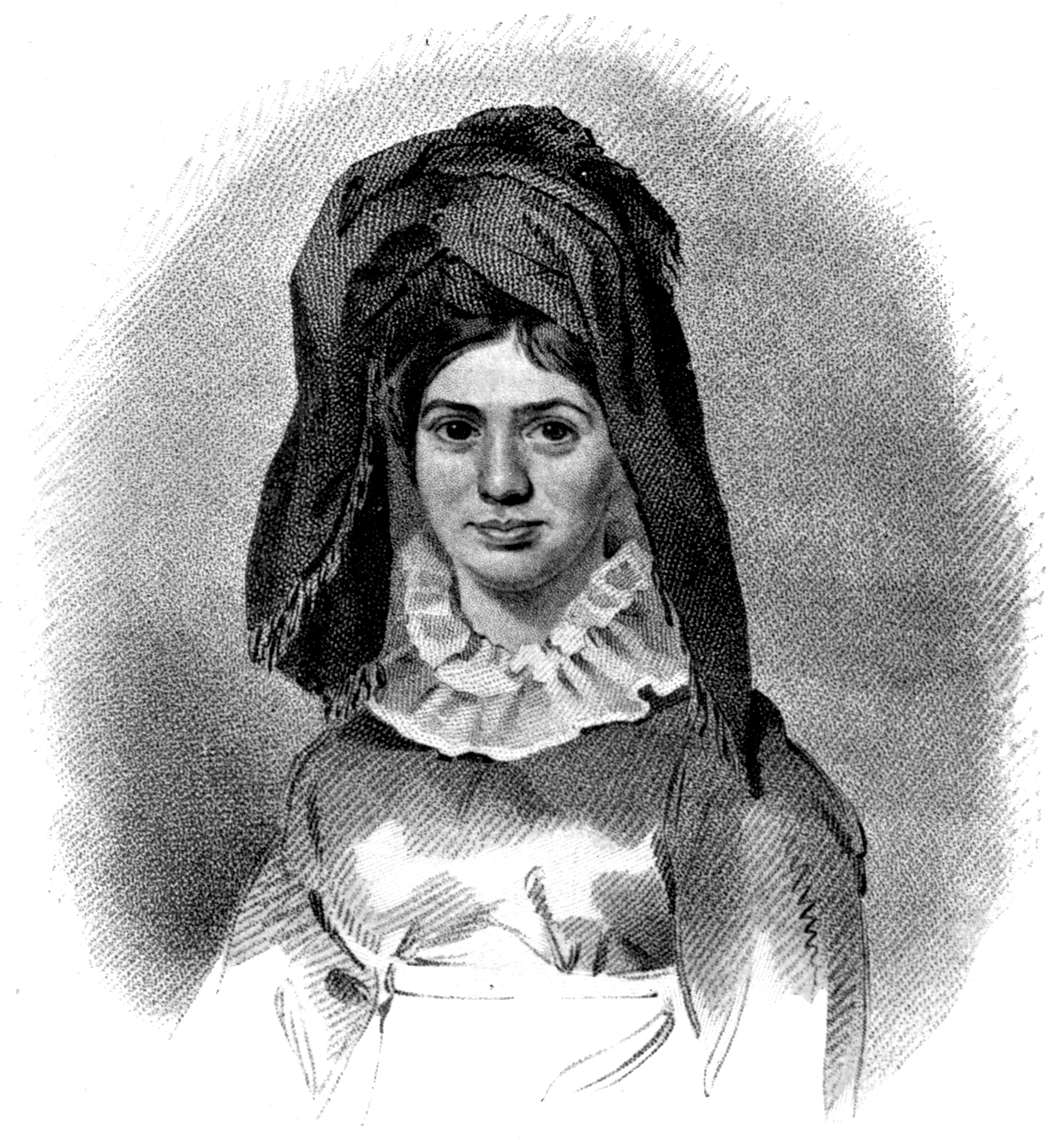
Princess Caraboo

- August 3 – Jakob Walter, German stonemason, common draftee (b. 1788)
- August 4 – David Hansemann, Prussian politician (b. 1790)
- August 19 – Trương Định, Vietnamese leader (suicide) (b. 1820)
- August 31 – Ferdinand Lassalle, Prussian-German philosopher, socialist and politician (b. 1825)
- September 3 – Emil Oskar Nobel, younger brother of Alfred Nobel (killed in an explosion) (b. 1843)
- October 1 – Juan José Flores, President of Ecuador (b. 1800)
- October 12 – Roger Taney, Chief Justice of the United States Supreme Court (b. 1777)
- November 6 – Tuanku Imam Bonjol, Indonesian religious and military leader (b. 1772)
- November 20 – Albert Newsam, American artist (born 1809)
- November 30
  - John Adams, Confederate general (in battle) (b. 1825)
  - Patrick Cleburne, Confederate general (in battle) (b. 1828)
  - States Rights Gist, Confederate general (in battle) (b. 1831)
- December 1 – William L. Dayton – United States Minister to France (b. 1807)
- December 8 – George Boole, English mathematician, philosopher (b. 1815)
- December 21 – Archduke Louis of Austria (b. 1784)
- December 23 – James Bronterre O'Brien, British Chartist (b. 1804)
- December 24 – Mary Baker (née Willcocks), aka Princess Caraboo (b. 1791)
- December 31 – George M. Dallas, U.S. Senator, 11th Vice President of the United States (b. 1792)

=== Date unknown ===
- Fu Shanxiang, Chinese scholar, Chancellor (b. 1833)

1865

=== January–June ===
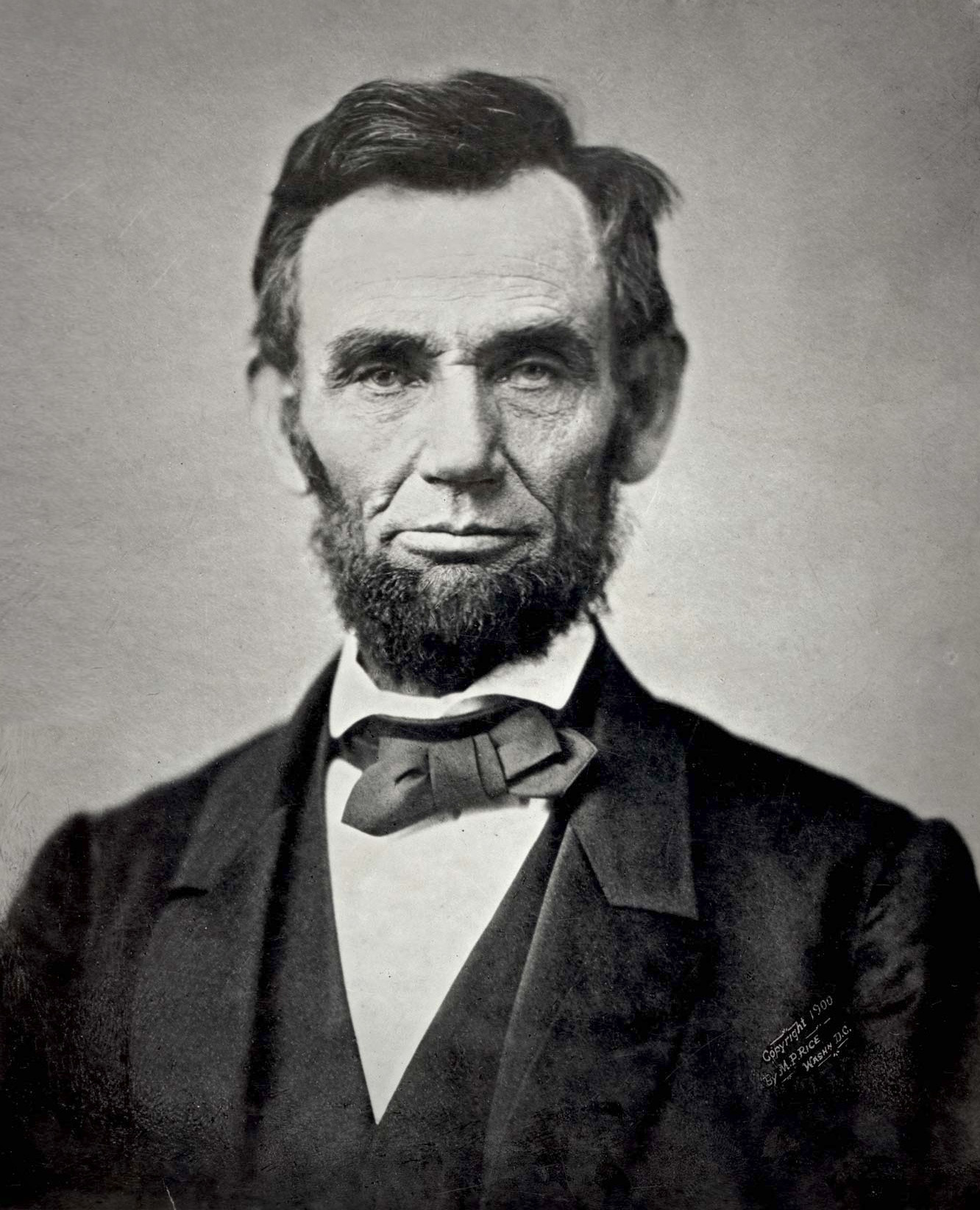
Abraham Lincoln

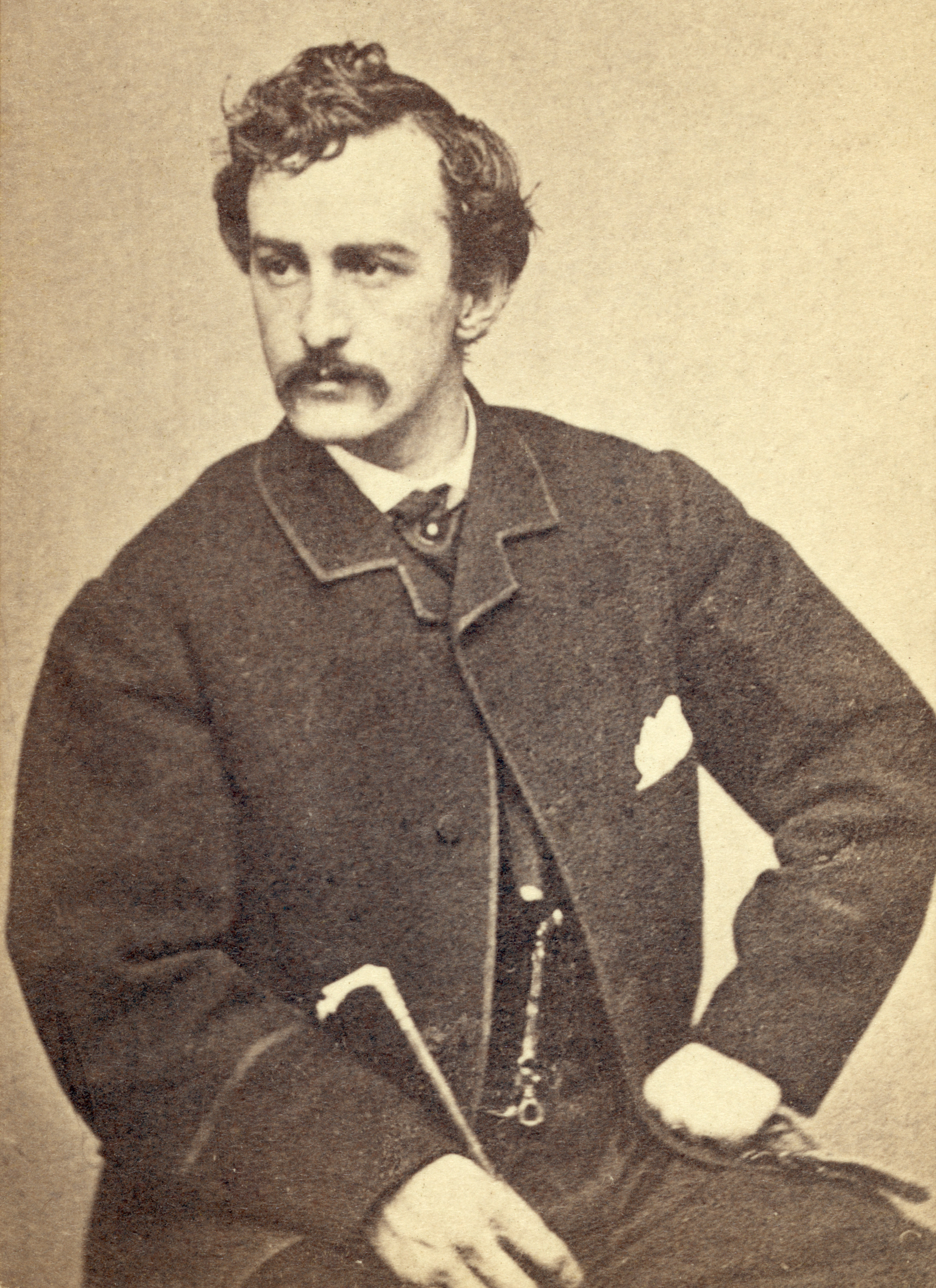
John Wilkes Booth

- January 14 – Marie-Anne Libert, Belgian botanist (b. 1782)
- January 19 – Pierre-Joseph Proudhon, French philosopher, anarchist (b. 1809)
- January 28 – Felice Romani, Italian poet, librettist (b. 1788)
- February 6 – Isabella Beeton, British cook, household management expert (b. 1836)
- March 1 – Anna Pavlovna of Russia, queen consort of the Netherlands (b. 1795)
- March 20 – Yamanami Keisuke, Japanese samurai (b. 1833)
- March 30 – Alexander Dukhnovich, Russian priest, writer and social activist (b. 1803
- April 1
  - John Milton, Governor of Florida (b. 1807)
  - Giuditta Pasta, Italian soprano (b. 1798)
- April 2 – A. P. Hill, American Confederate general (b. 1825)
- April 13 – Achille Valenciennes, French zoologist (b. 1794)
- April 15 – Abraham Lincoln, 16th President of the United States (b. 1809)
- April 18 – Léon Jean Marie Dufour, French medical doctor, naturalist (b. 1780)
- April 24 – Nicholas Alexandrovich, Tsarevich of Russia (b. 1843)
- April 26 – John Wilkes Booth, American actor, assassin of Abraham Lincoln (b. 1838)
- April 28 – Sir Samuel Cunard, Canadian businessman, founder of the Cunard Line (b. 1787)
- May 5 – Ben Hall, Australian bushranger (b. 1837)
- May 10 – William Armstrong, American lawyer, civil servant, politician, and businessperson (b. 1782)

=== July–December ===
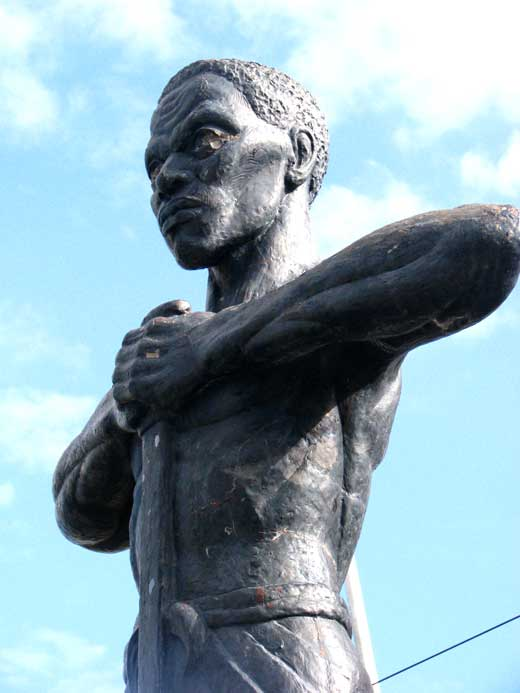
Paul Bogle

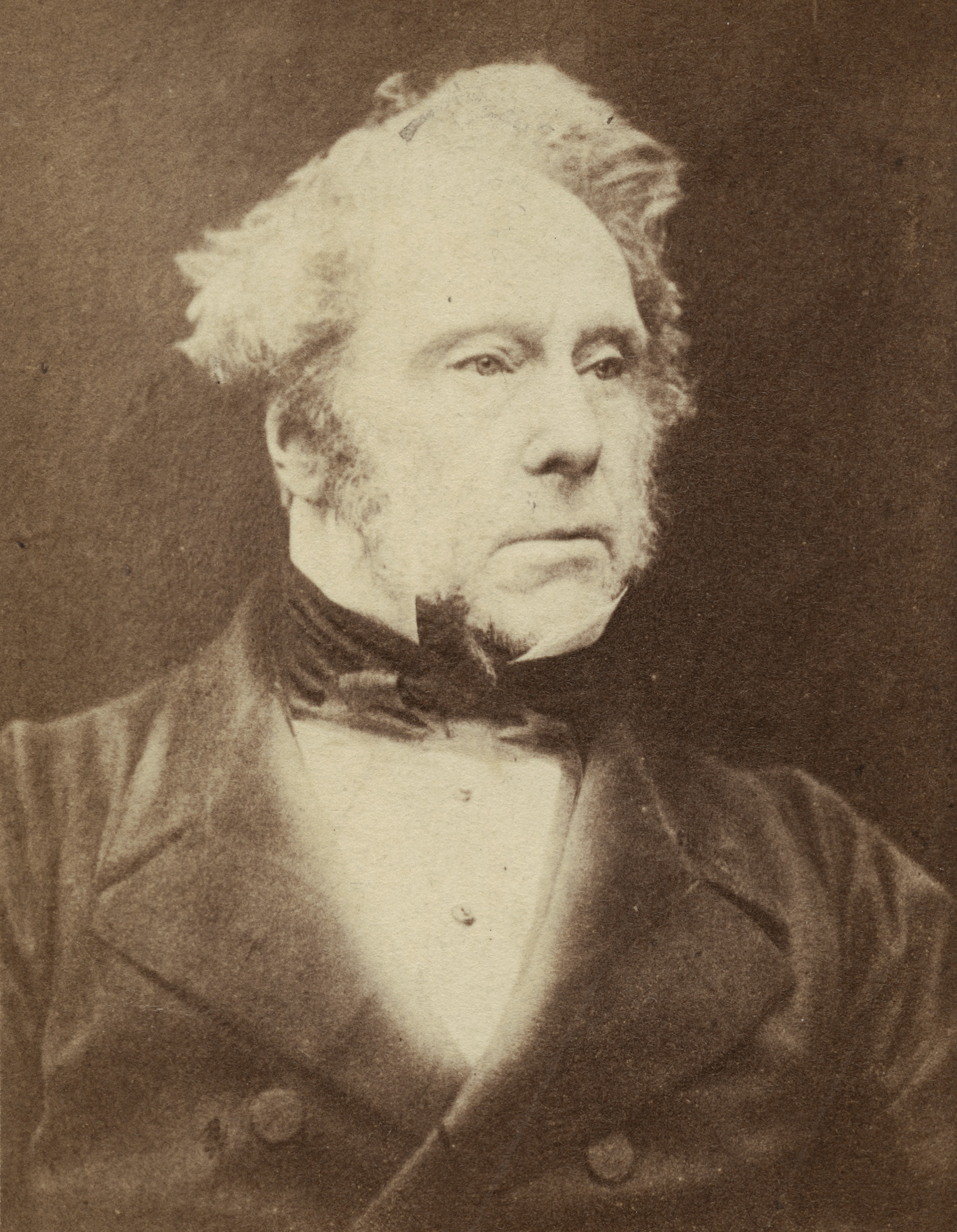
Henry John Temple

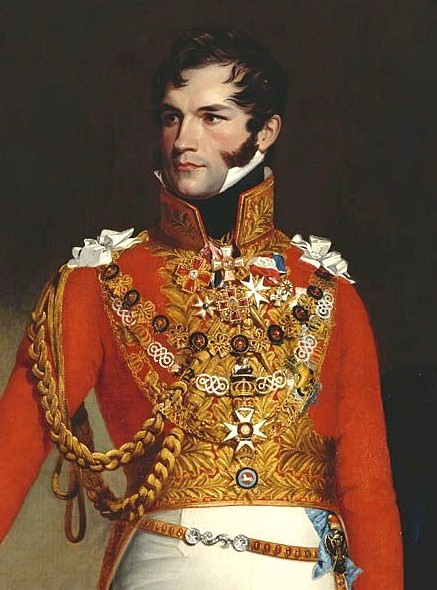
Leopold I of Belgium

- July – Dimitris Plapoutas, Greek military leader (b. 1786)
- July 6 – Princess Sophie of Sweden, Grand Duchess of Baden (b. 1801)
- July 7 – The Lincoln assassination conspirators (executed)
  - Lewis Powell (b. 1844)
  - David Herold (b. 1842)
  - George Atzerodt (b. 1835)
  - Mary Surratt (b. 1823)
- July 25 – James Barry, British military surgeon (b. 1795)
- August 4 – Percival Drayton, United States Navy officer (b. 1812)
- August 12 – William Jackson Hooker, English botanist (b. 1785)
- August 13 – Ignaz Semmelweis, Hungarian physician (b. 1818)
- August 16 – Sir Frederick Stovin, British army general (b. 1783)
- August 27 – Thomas Chandler Haliburton, Canadian author (b. 1796)
- August 29 – Robert Remak, German embryologist, physiologist and neurologist (b. 1815)
- September 2 – William Rowan Hamilton, Irish mathematician (b. 1805)
- September 10 – Maria Silfvan, Finnish actor (b. 1802)
- September 25 – Andrés de Santa Cruz, Peruvian military officer, seventh President of Peru and President of Bolivia (b. 1792)
- October 16 – Andrés Bello, Venezuelan poet, lawmaker, teacher, philosopher and sociologist (b. 1781)
- October 18 – Henry John Temple, 3rd Viscount Palmerston, Prime Minister of the United Kingdom (b. 1784)
- October 24 – Paul Bogle, Jamaican activist, Baptist deacon and leader of the Morant Bay rebellion. (executed) (b. 1820)
- November 10 – Henry Wirz, Swiss-born American Confederate military officer, prisoner-of-war camp commander (executed) (b. 1823)
- November 12 – Elizabeth Gaskell, British novelist, biographer (b. 1810)
- November 28
  - José Manuel Pareja, Spanish admiral (suicide) (b. 1813)
  - William Machin Stairs, Canadian businessman, statesman (b. 1789)
- November 29 – Isaac A. Van Amburgh, American animal trainer (b. 1811)
- December 6 – Sebastián Iradier, Spanish composer (b. 1809)
- December 10 – King Leopold I of Belgium (b. 1790)
- December 14 – Johan Georg Forchhammer, Danish geologist (b. 1794)
- December 17 – Luigi Ciacchi, Italian cardinal (b. 1788)

1866

=== January–June ===
- January (date unknown) – Thomas Baldwin Marsh, American religious leader (b. 1799)
- January 16 – Phineas Quimby, American physician (b. 1802)
- January 19 – Harriet Ludlow Clarke, British artist
- January 23 – Thomas Love Peacock, English satirist (b. 1785)
- January 31 – Friedrich Rückert, German poet, translator and professor of Oriental languages (b. 1788)
- February 25 – Sarah Ann Gill, Barbadian national heroine (b. 1795)
- March 4 – Alexander Campbell, Irish/U.S. founder of the Disciples of Christ (b. 1788)
- March 6 – William Whewell, English scientist, philosopher and historian of science (b. 1794)
- March 9 – Jakob Joseph Matthys, Swiss Catholic priest (b. 1802)
- March 20 – Rikard Nordraak, Norwegian composer (b. 1842)
- March 21 – Nadezhda Durova, first female Russian military officer (b. 1783)
- March 24 – Maria Amalia of Naples and Sicily, Queen of France (b. 1782)
- March 28 – Solomon Foot, American politician (b. 1802)
- March 29 – John Keble, British churchman (b. 1792)
- April 1 – Elizabeth Jesser Reid, English social reformer, founder of Bedford College (b. 1789)
- April 4 – William Dick, founder of Edinburgh Veterinary College (b. 1793)
- April 5 – Thomas Hodgkin, British physician (b. 1798)
- April 7 – Johann Sedlatzek, German flautist (b. 1789)
- April 12 – Peter Hesketh-Fleetwood, English Member of Parliament and developer (b. 1801)
- May 13 – Nikolai Brashman, Russian mathematician of Czech origin (b. 1796)
- May 29 – Winfield Scott, American general and presidential candidate (b. 1786)
- June 7 – Chief Sealth, Native American for whom Seattle is named (b. c. 1786)
- June 17 – Lewis Cass, American military officer, politician, and statesman (b. 1782)

=== July–December ===
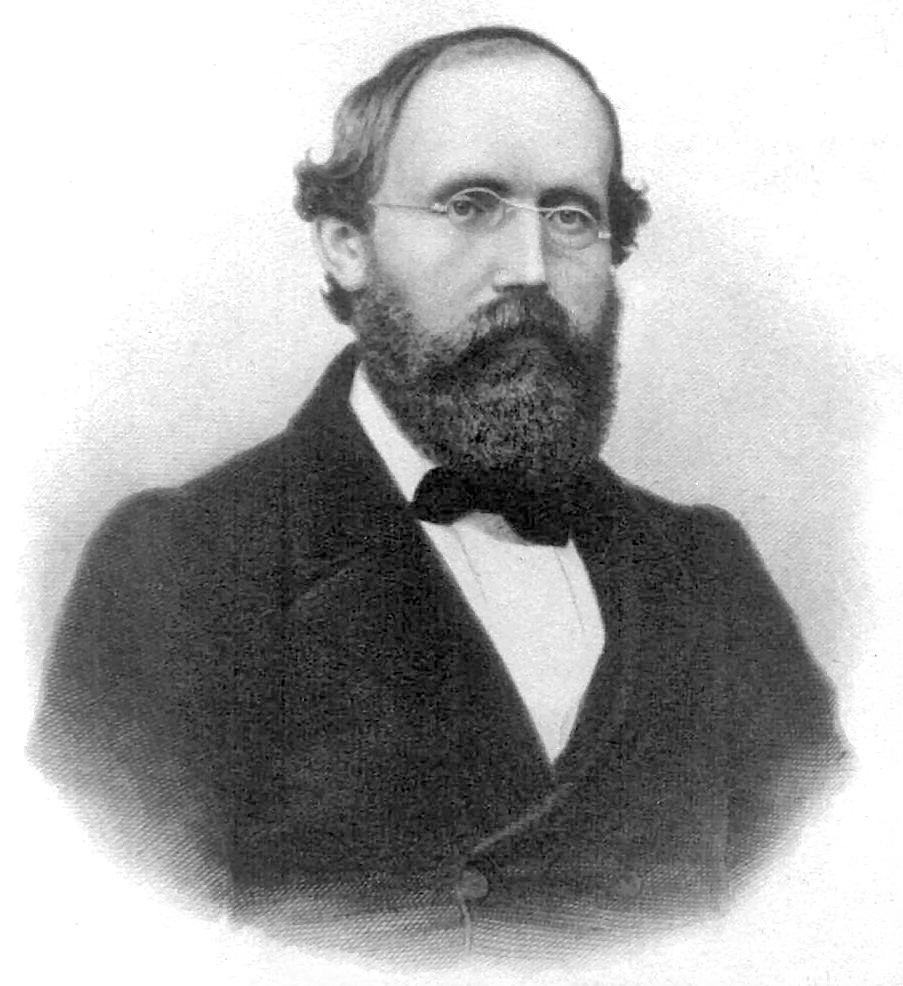
Bernhard Riemann

- July 20 – Bernhard Riemann, German mathematician (b. 1826)
- July 25 – Floride Calhoun, Second Lady of the United States (b. 1792)
- July 29 – Madame Clicquot Ponsardin, French champagne producer (b. 1777)
- August 1 – John Ross, long-serving principal chief of the Cherokee Nation, of natural causes, in Washington D. C. (born 1790 in Cherokee Nation East).
- August 6 – Christian Eric Fahlcrantz, Swedish writer (b. 1790)
- August 20 – Maria De Mattias, Italian Catholic saint (b. 1805)
- August 29 – Tokugawa Iemochi, 14th shōgun of the Tokugawa shogunate of Japan (b. 1846)
- September 4 – Theresa Pulszky, European author (b. 1819)
- September 30 – Per Gustaf Svinhufvud af Qvalstad, treasurer of Tavastia province, manor host, and paternal grandfather of President of Finland P. E. Svinhufvud (b. 1804)
- October 13 – Celadon Leeds Daboll, American merchant and inventor (b. 1818)
- October 18 – Manuel Bulnes, Chilean general and politician, President of Chile (b. 1799)
- November 11 – Agustín Jerónimo de Iturbide y Huarte, Prince Imperial of Mexico (b. 1807)
- November 14 – King Miguel I of Portugal (b. 1802)
- November 26 – Jean-Jacques Willmar, Luxembourg politician (b. 1792)
- December 1 – George Everest, Welsh geodesist (b. 1790)
- December 21 – William J. Fetterman, United States Army officer (b. 1835?)
- December 21 – Mercedes Marín del Solar, Chilean poet, reform educator (b. 1804)
- December 25 – Hayrullah Efendi, Ottoman physician, historian, and official (b. 1818)

=== Date unknown ===
- Du Bois Agett, early settler of Western Australia (b. 1796)

1867

=== January–June ===
Emperor Kōmei

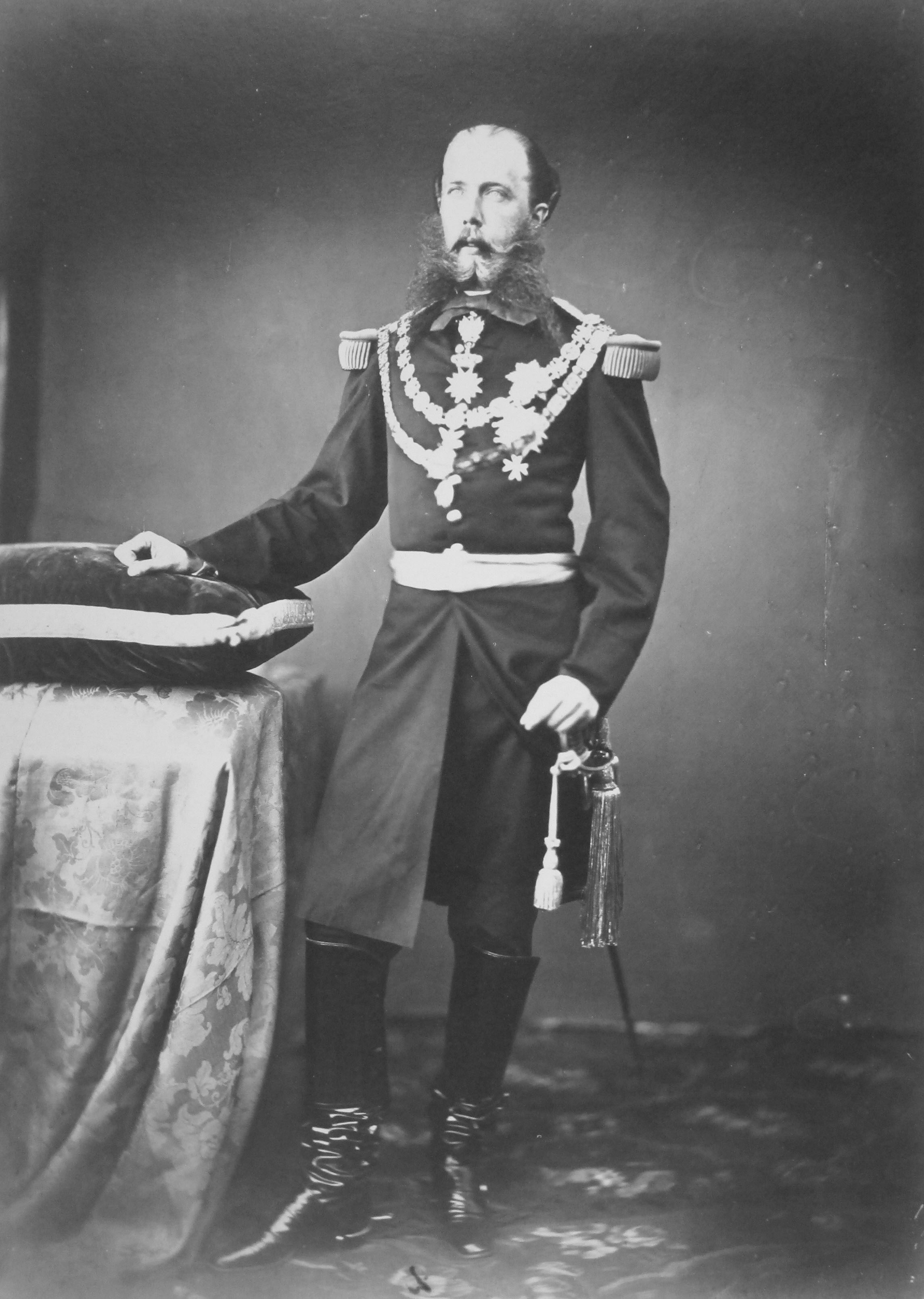
Emperor Maximilian I of Mexico

- January 14 – Jean-Auguste-Dominique Ingres, French painter (b. 1780)
- January 28 – Ary Prins, Acting Governor-General of the Dutch East Indies who served 2 terms (b. 1816)
- January 30 – Emperor Kōmei, 121st Emperor of Japan (b. 1831)
- March 6 – Artemus Ward, American humorist (b. 1834) (tuberculosis)
- March 25 – Friedlieb Ferdinand Runge, German chemist (b. 1794)
- April 1 – Louis du Couret, French explorer, writer and military officer (b. 1812)
- April 12 – David Canabarro, Brazilian general, Gaúcho revolutionary (b. 1796)
- April 18 – Robert Smirke, British architect (b. 1780)
- April 27 – Benjamin Hall, 1st Baron Llanover, after whom Big Ben may be named (b. 1802)
- May 12 – Friedrich Wilhelm Eduard Gerhard, German archaeologist (b. 1795)
- May 23 – William Crawshay II, Welsh industrialist (b. 1788)
- May 29 – Margaretta Morris, American entomologist (b. 1797)
- May 30 – Ramón Castilla, Peruvian military leader and politician, three times President of Peru (b. 1797)
- June 19 – Emperor Maximilian I of Mexico (executed) (b. 1832)

=== July–December ===
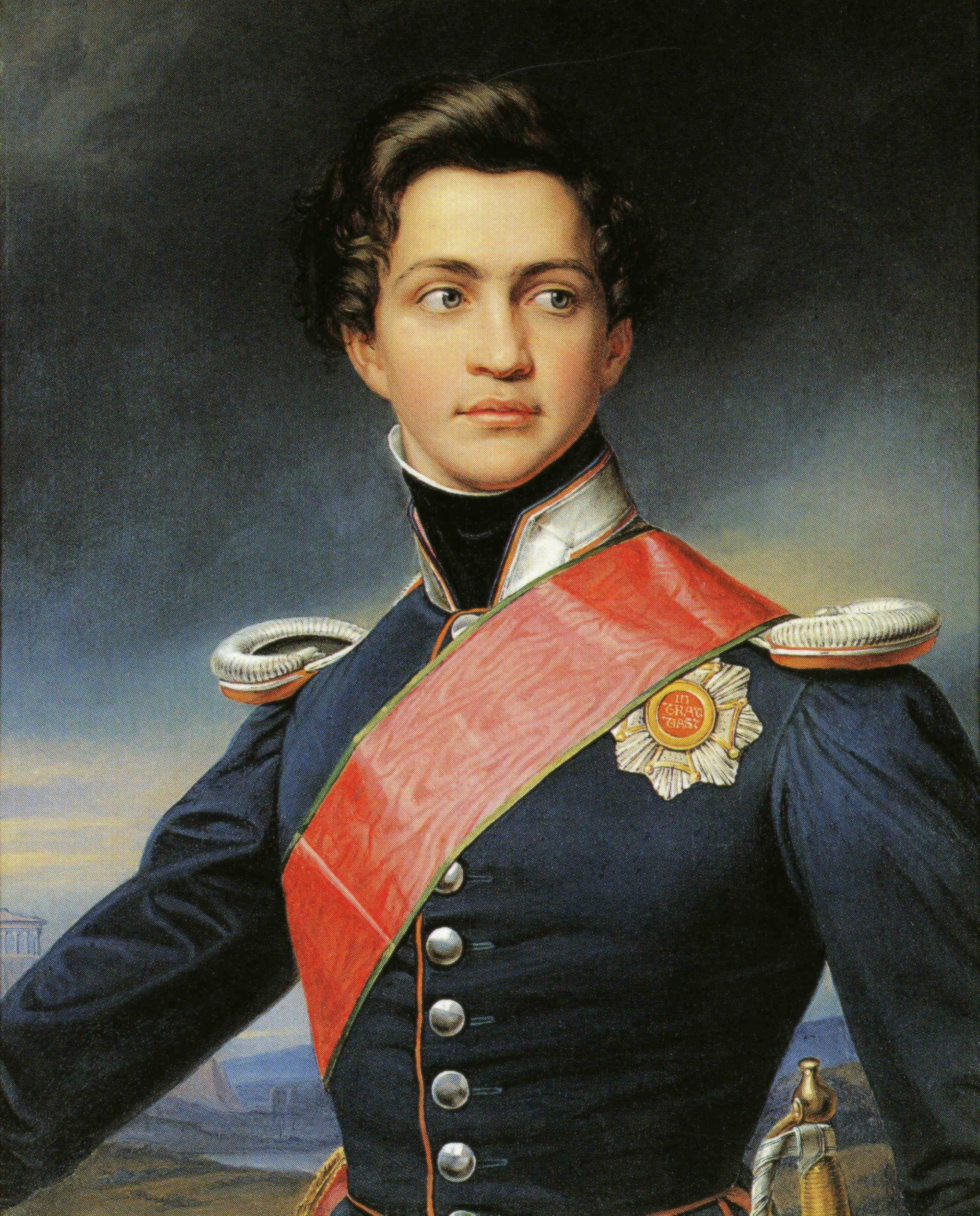
King Otto of Greece

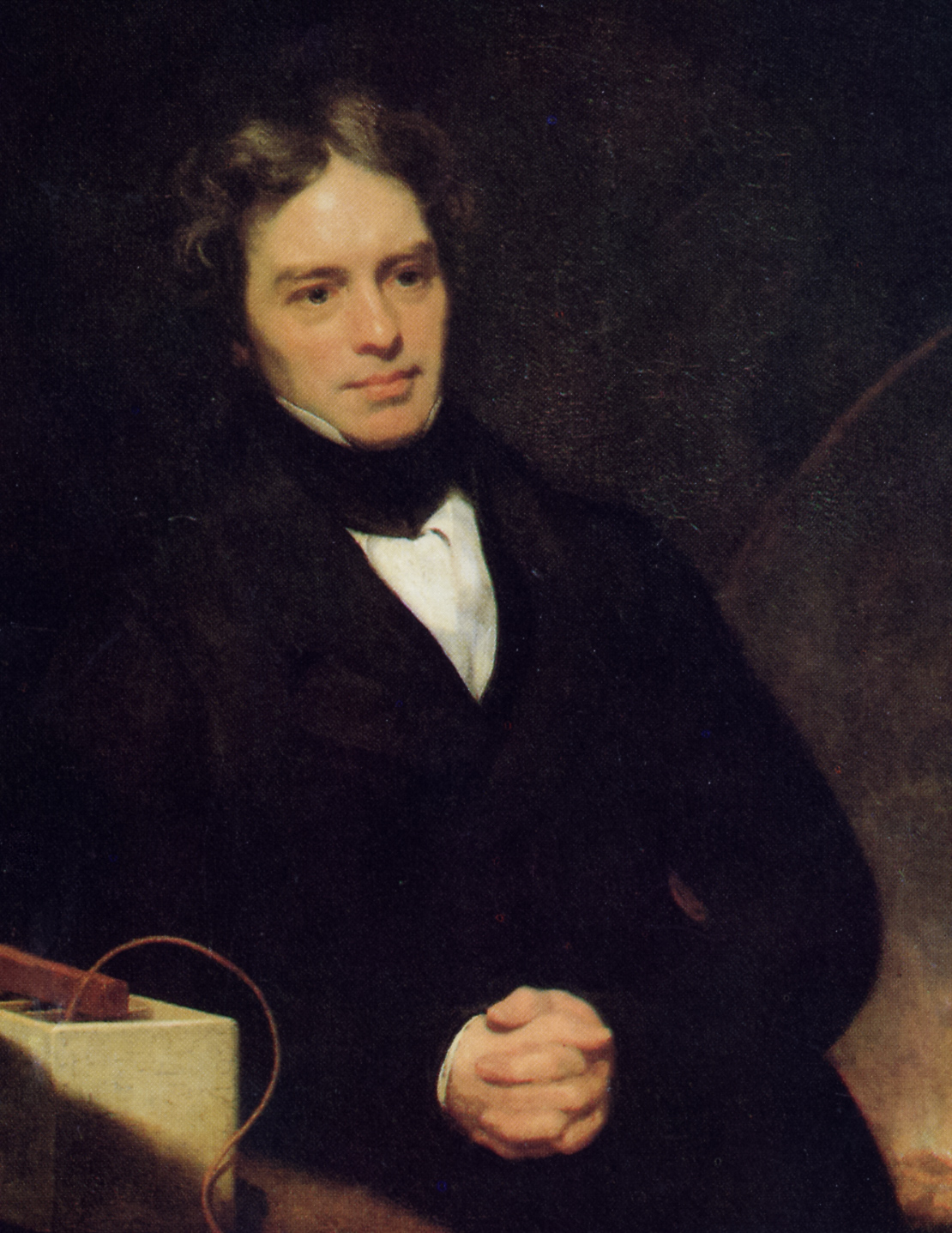
Michael Faraday

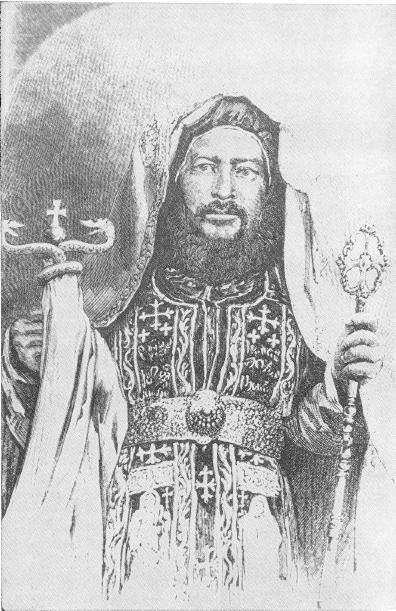
Metropolitan Abuna Salama III

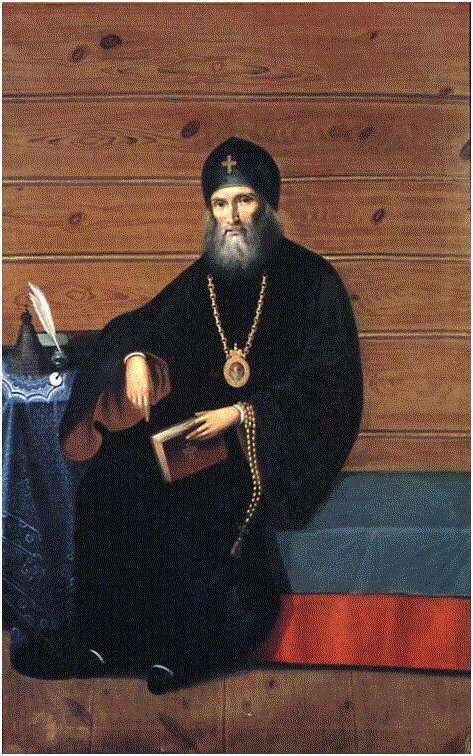
Filaret, Metropolitan of Moscow

- July – Thomas Baker, Methodist missionary to Fiji (b. 1832)
- July 1 – Thomas Francis Meagher, American Civil War general (b. 1823)
- July 26 – King Otto of Greece (b. 1815)
- July 31
  - Benoît Fourneyron, French engineer, inventor of the turbine (b. 1802)
  - Catharine Maria Sedgwick, American "domestic fiction" novelist (b. 1789)
- August 3 – August Böckh, German scholar and antiquarian (b. 1785)
- August 6 – David R. Porter, American politician (b. 1788)
- August 8 – Maria Theresa of Austria, second Queen consort of Ferdinand II of the Two Sicilies (b. 1816)
- August 21 – Juan Álvarez, interim president of Mexico in 1855 (b. 1790)
- August 25 – Michael Faraday, English chemist and physicist (b. 1791)
- August 31 – Charles Baudelaire, French writer (b. 1821)
- September 10 – Simon Sechter, Austrian music teacher (b. 1788)
- September 26 – James Ferguson, Scotland-born American astronomer (b. 1797)
- October – Kerekorio Manu Rangi, last king of Easter Island, tuberculosis (b. 1853/5)
- October 9 – Ignacy Feliks Dobrzyński, Polish composer (b. 1807)
- October 11 – Gunatitanand Swami, Indian paramahamsa of the Hindu Swaminarayan Sampraday sect (b. 1785)
- October 23 – Franz Bopp, German linguist (b. 1791)
- October 25 – Abuna Salama III, metropolitan of the Ethiopian Church
- October 31 – William Parsons, 3rd Earl of Rosse, Irish astronomer (b. 1800)
- November 19
  - Fitz-Greene Halleck, American poet (b. 1790)
  - Ren Zhu, Chinese leader of the Nian Rebellion, killed in battle (b. 1830?)
- December 1 – Filaret, Metropolitan of Moscow, Russian Orthodox leader (b. 1782)
- December 10 – Sakamoto Ryōma, Japanese samurai, politician and businessman (b. 1836)
- December 26 – József Kossics, Hungarian-Slovenian Catholic priest, writer and ethnologist (b. 1788)
- December 30 – Sarah Booth, English actress (b. 1793)

1868

=== January–June ===
- January 20 – Damien Marchesseault, 7th Mayor of Los Angeles (suicide) (b. 1818)
- January 23 – János Erdélyi, Hungarian poet and ethnographer (b. 1814)
- January 28 – Adalbert Stifter, Austrian writer (b. 1805)
- February 8 – Lai Wenguang, Chinese leader of the Taiping Rebellion and Nien Rebellion (b. 1827)
- February 10 – Sir David Brewster, Scottish physicist (b. 1781)
- February 11 – Léon Foucault, French physicist (b. 1819)
- February 19 – Venancio Flores, Uruguayan general and president of Uruguay (b. 1808)
- February 29 – King Ludwig I of Bavaria (b. 1786)
- March 4 – Jesse Chisholm, American pioneer (b. 1805)
- March 19 – Philipp von Stadion und Thannhausen, Austrian field marshal (b. 1799)
- March 28 – James Brudenell, 7th Earl of Cardigan, British military leader (b. 1797)
- April 3 – Franz Berwald, Swedish composer (b. 1796)
- April 7 – Thomas D'Arcy McGee, Canadian father of confederation (assassinated) (b. 1825)
- April 12 – James Gascoyne-Cecil, 2nd Marquess of Salisbury, British politician and peer (b. 1791)
- April 13 – Emperor Theodore or Tewodros II of Ethiopia by suicide (b. 1818)
- April 21 – Henry O'Farrell, Irish-Australian criminal (executed) (b. 1833)
- May 7 – Henry Brougham, 1st Baron Brougham and Vaux, Lord High Chancellor of Great Britain (b. 1778)
- May 10 – Henry Bennett, American politician (b. 1808)

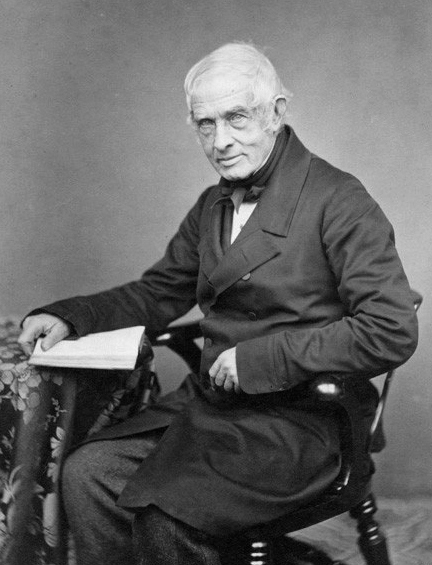
John Crawfurd

- May 11 – John Crawfurd, Scottish physician, colonial administrator, diplomat and author, last British Resident of Singapore (b. 1783)
- May 17 – Isami Kondo, Commander of the Shinsengumi (b. 1834)
- May 22 – Julius Plücker, German mathematician and physicist (b. 1801)
- May 23 – Kit Carson, American trapper, scout, and Indian agent (b. 1809)
- June 1 – James Buchanan, 15th President of the United States (b. 1791)
- June 10 – Princess Anka Obrenović, Serbian princess (b. 1821)
- June 22 – Heber C. Kimball, Latter Day Saint leader (b. 1801)
- June 29 – Sir John Lillie, British army officer, entrepreneur and inventor (b. 1790)

=== July–December ===
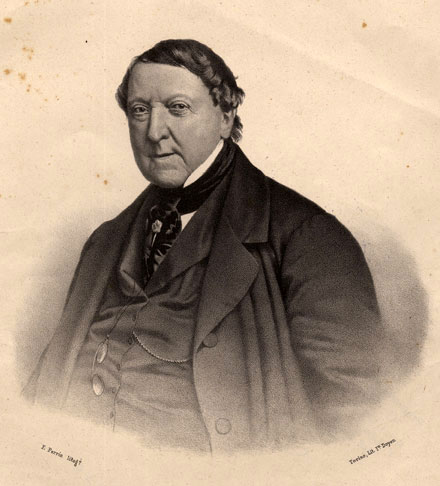
Gioachino Rossini

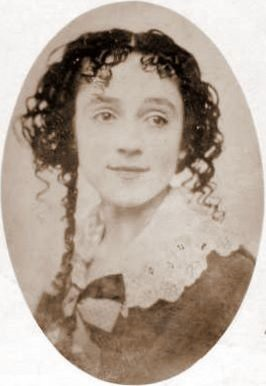
Adah Isaacs Menken

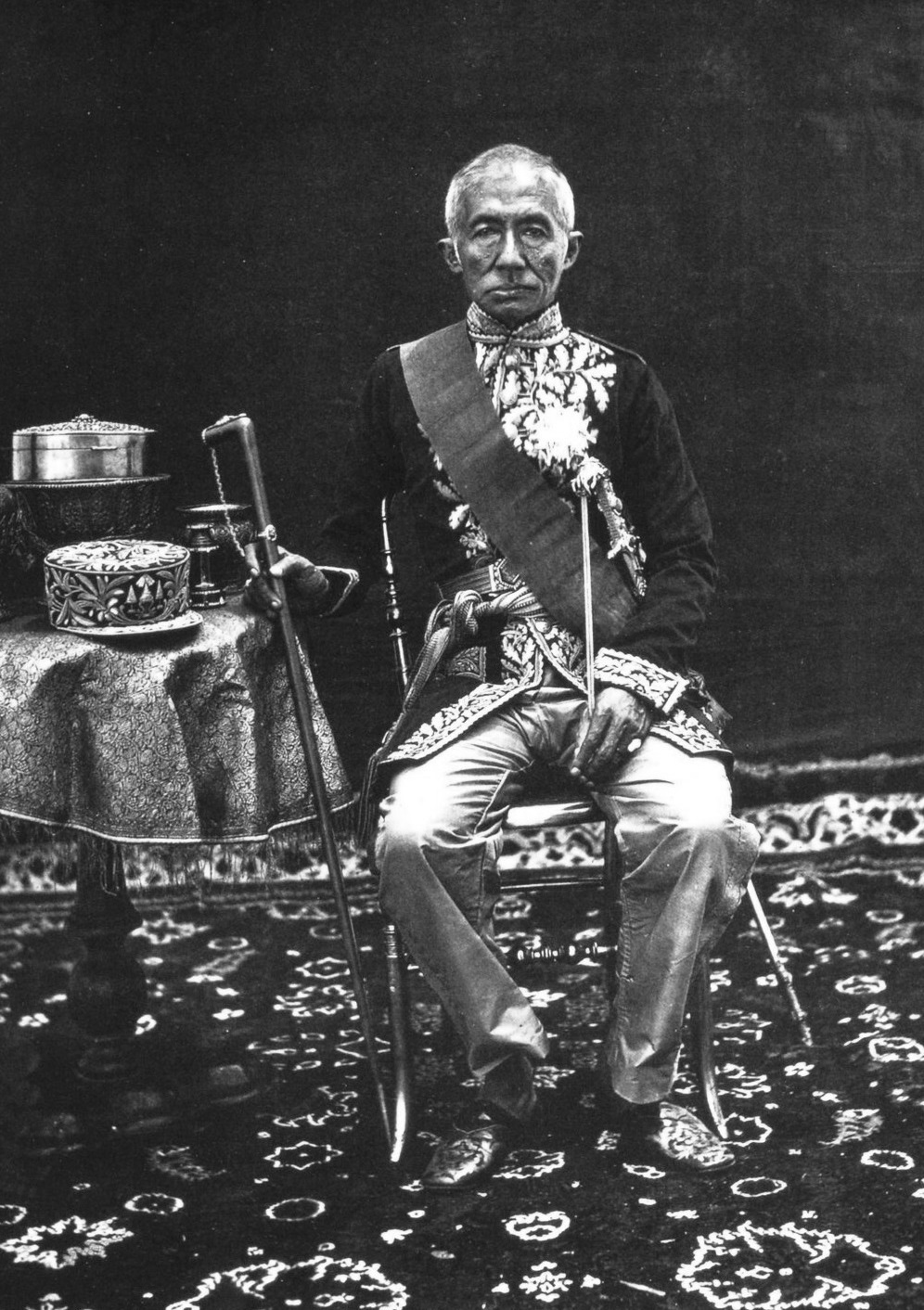
Mongkut

- July 6 – Harada Sanosuke, Shinsengumi Captain (b. 1840)
- July 19 – Okita Sōji, Shinsengumi Captain (b. 1842 or 1844)
- July 21 – William Bland, Australian politician (b. 1789)
- July 26 – Robert Rolfe, 1st Baron Cranworth, English Lord High Chancellor of Great Britain (b. 1791)
- July 29 – John Elliotson, English physician (b. 1791)
- August 3 – Edward Welch, Welsh architect (b. 1806)
- August 7 – Pedro de Ampudia, Mexican General (b. 1805)
- August 10 – Adah Isaacs Menken, American actress (b. 1835)
- August 11 – Thaddeus Stevens, American politician (b. 1792)
- August 25 – Charlotte Birch-Pfeiffer, German actress, writer and theater director (b. 1799)
- August 29 – Christian Friedrich Schönbein, German chemist (b. 1799)
- September 1 – Ferenc Gyulay, Hungarian nobleman, general and governor (b. 1799)
- September 7 – Gustavus von Tempsky, Prussian adventurer, artist, and soldier (b. 1828)
- September 9 – Mzilikazi, first king of Mthwakazi (b. c.1790)
- September 11 – Maria James, Welsh-born American poet (b. 1793)
- September 19 – William Sprague, American minister and politician from Michigan (b. 1809)
- September 26 – August Ferdinand Möbius, German mathematician and astronomer (b. 1790)
- October 1 – Mongkut (Rama IV), King of Siam (Thailand) (b. 1804)
- October 9 – Howell Cobb, American politician (b. 1815)
- October 17 – Laura Secord, Canadian patriot (b. 1775)
- October 27 – Charles Longley, Archbishop of Canterbury (b. 1794)
- November 13 – Gioachino Rossini, Italian composer (b. 1792)
- November 15 – James Mayer de Rothschild, German-born banker (b. 1792)
- November 27 – Chief Black Kettle, Southern Cheyenne Peace Chief, Survivor of Sand Creek massacre (b. 1803)
- December 6 – August Schleicher, German linguist (b. 1821)
- December 23 – Sir Herbert Edwardes, British army general and colonial administrator (b. 1819)
- December 25 – Linus Yale, Jr., American inventor (b. 1821)
- December 31 – Cyrus Kingsbury, American missionary and Choctaw linguist (b.1786)

1869

=== January–June ===
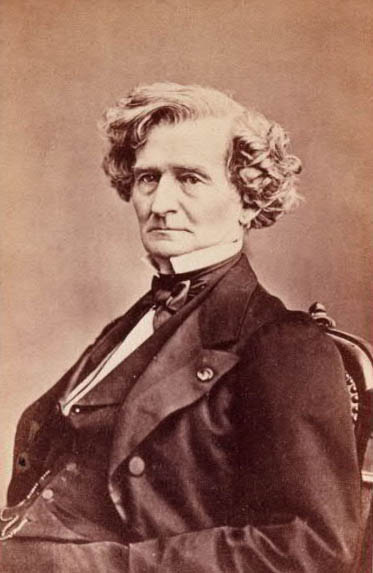
Hector Berlioz

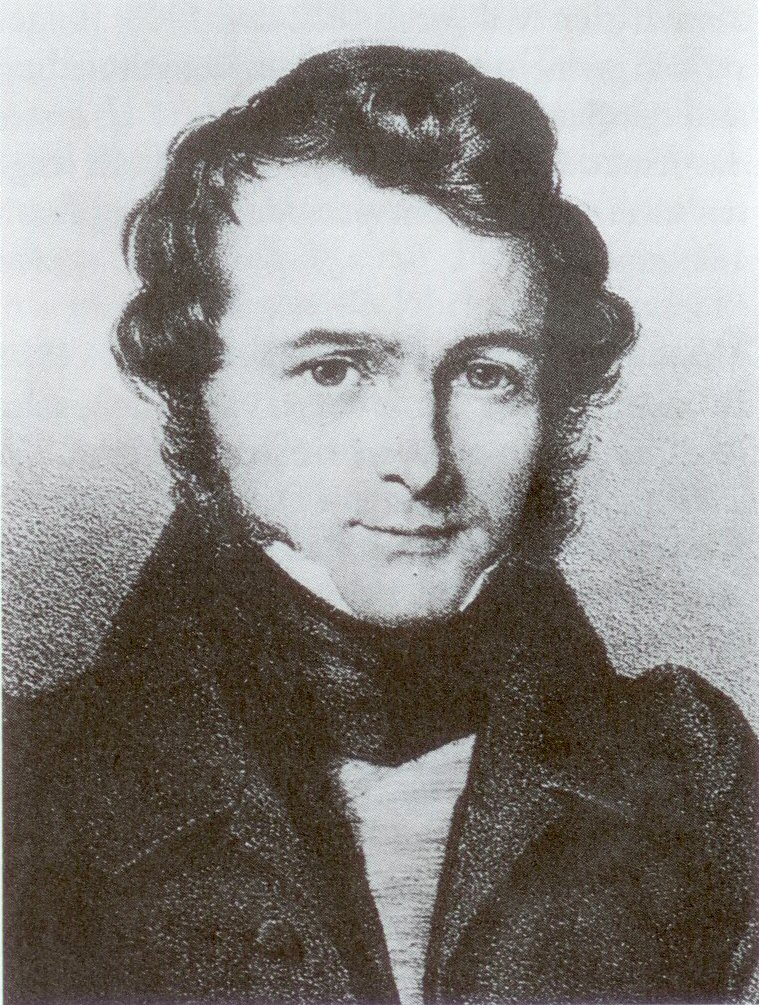
Christian Erich Hermann von Meyer

- January 1
  - Martin W. Bates, American senator (b. 1786)
  - James B. Longacre, fourth Chief Engraver of the U.S. Mint (b. 1794)
- January 18 – Bertalan Szemere, 3rd Prime Minister of Hungary (b. 1812)
- January 19 – Carl Reichenbach, German chemist (b. 1788)
- January 30
  - Frances Catherine Barnard, English author (b. 1796)
  - William Carleton, Irish novelist (b. 1794)
- February 15 – Ghalib, Indian poet (b. 1797)
- March 8 – Hector Berlioz, French composer (b. 1803)
- March 20 – John Pascoe Grenfell, British admiral of the Brazilian Navy (b. 1800)
- March 21 – Juan Almonte, Mexican general, diplomat and regent (b. 1803)
- March 22 – Antoine-Henri Jomini, French general (b. 1779)
- April 2 – Christian Erich Hermann von Meyer, German palaeontologist (b. 1801)
- April 20 – Carl Loewe, German composer (b. 1796)
- June 16 – Charles Sturt, Australian explorer (b. 1795)
- June 18 – Giovanni Battista Bugatti, Italian executioner (b. 1779)
- June 20 – Hijikata Toshizō, Japanese military commander (b. 1835)

=== July–December ===
- July 18 – Laurent Clerc, French advocate for the American deaf (b. 1785)
- July 22 – John A. Roebling, American bridge engineer (b. 1806)
- July 28 – Carl Gustav Carus, German physiologist (b. 1789)
- August 21 – Casto Méndez Núñez, Spanish admiral (b. 1824)
- August 31 – Mary Ward, Irish scientist, first car crash victim (b. 1827)
- September 4 – John Pascoe Fawkner, Australian pioneer, settler and politician, (b. 1792)
- September 10 – John Bell, American politician, 1860 presidential candidate, (b.1796)
- September 12 – Peter Mark Roget, British lexicographer (b. 1779)
- October 8 – Franklin Pierce, 64, 14th President of the United States (b. 1804)
- October 12 – Pyotr Anjou, arctic explorer and admiral of the Russian Navy (b. 1796)
- October 13 – Charles Augustin Sainte-Beuve, French literary critic (b. 1804)
- October 16 – Joseph Ritner, American politician (b. 1780)
- October 23 – Edward Smith-Stanley, 14th Earl of Derby, Prime Minister of the United Kingdom (b. 1799)
- October 31 – Charles A. Wickliffe, American politician, 14th Governor of Kentucky (b. 1788)
- November 8 – Christodoulos Hatzipetros, Greek military leader (b. 1799)
- November 10 – John E. Wool, general officer in the United States Army, who served during the War of 1812, Mexican–American War, and the American Civil War (b. 1784)
- December 8 – Narcisa de Jesús Martillo, Ecuadorian saint (b. 1832)
- December 18 – Louis Moreau Gottschalk, American composer, pianist (b. 1829)
- December 24 – Edwin Stanton, American lawyer, judge and politician (b. 1814)

== See also ==
- Victorian Era
- Reconstruction Era (for most of the decade).
- American Civil War (for the decade's first half).
