= 1861 =

1861 in various calendars
- Gregorian calendar: 1861; MDCCCLXI
- Ab urbe condita: 2614
- Armenian calendar: 1310; ԹՎ ՌՅԺ
- Assyrian calendar: 6611
- Baháʼí calendar: 17–18
- Balinese saka calendar: 1782–1783
- Bengali calendar: 1267–1268
- Berber calendar: 2811
- British Regnal year: 24 Vict. 1 – 25 Vict. 1
- Buddhist calendar: 2405
- Burmese calendar: 1223
- Byzantine calendar: 7369–7370
- Chinese calendar: 庚申年 (Metal Monkey); 4558 or 4351 — to — 辛酉年 (Metal Rooster); 4559 or 4352
- Coptic calendar: 1577–1578
- Discordian calendar: 3027
- Ethiopian calendar: 1853–1854
- Hebrew calendar: 5621–5622
- Hindu calendars
- Vikram Samvat: 1917–1918
- Shaka Samvat: 1782–1783
- Kali Yuga: 4961–4962
- Holocene calendar: 11861
- Igbo calendar: 861–862
- Iranian calendar: 1239–1240
- Islamic calendar: 1277–1278
- Japanese calendar: Man'en 2 / Bunkyū 1 (文久元年)
- Javanese calendar: 1789–1790
- Julian calendar: Gregorian minus 12 days
- Korean calendar: 4194
- Minguo calendar: 51 before ROC 民前51年
- Nanakshahi calendar: 393
- Thai solar calendar: 2403–2404
- Tibetan calendar: ལྕགས་ཕོ་སྤྲེ་ལོ་ (male Iron-Monkey); 1987 or 1606 or 834 — to — ལྕགས་མོ་བྱ་ལོ་ (female Iron-Bird); 1988 or 1607 or 835

1861 (MDCCCLXI) was a common year starting on Tuesday of the Gregorian calendar and a common year starting on Sunday of the Julian calendar, the 1861st year of the Common Era (CE) and Anno Domini (AD) designations, the 861st year of the 2nd millennium, the 61st year of the 19th century, and the 2nd year of the 1860s decade. As of the start of 1861, the Gregorian calendar was 12 days ahead of the Julian calendar, which remained in localized use until 1923.

This year saw significant progress in the Unification of Italy, the outbreak of the American Civil War, and the emancipation reform abolishing serfdom in the Russian Empire.

== Events ==
=== January ===
- January 1
  - Benito Juárez captures Mexico City.
  - The first steam-powered carousel is recorded, in Bolton, England.
- January 2 – Friedrich Wilhelm IV of Prussia dies, and is succeeded by Wilhelm I.

American Civil War:

  - January 3 – Delaware votes not to secede from the Union.
  - January 9 – Mississippi becomes the second state to secede from the Union.
  - January 10 – Florida secedes from the Union.
  - January 11 – Alabama secedes from the Union.
  - January 12 – Major Robert Anderson sends dispatches to Washington.
  - January 19 – Georgia secedes from the Union.
  - January 21 – Jefferson Davis resigns from the United States Senate.
  - January 26 – Louisiana secedes from the Union.
- January 29 – Kansas is admitted as the 34th U.S. state, being admitted as a free state.
- January 31 – Kukis raid the Chhagalnaiya plains in eastern Bengal, murdering and kidnapping hundreds of people, particularly women.

=== February ===
American Civil War:

  - February 1 – Texas secedes from the Union.
  - February 4 – In Montgomery, Alabama, the Provisional Confederate States Congress is formed by representatives from the first seven break-away states.
  - February 8 – The Confederate States of America are formed, comprising the first seven break-away States.
  - February 9 – Jefferson Davis is elected Provisional President of the Confederate States of America, by the Weed Convention at Montgomery, Alabama.
- February 11
  - American Civil War: The U.S. House unanimously passes a resolution, guaranteeing non-interference with slavery in any state.
  - About 850 convicts at Chatham Dockyard in England take over their prison in a riot.
- February 13 – Unification of Italy: The Siege of Gaeta, stronghold of the Neapolitan King Francis II, is ended by Piedmontese forces. Francis goes into exile.
- February 18 – American Civil War: In Montgomery, Alabama, Jefferson Davis is inaugurated as the provisional president of the Confederate States of America.
- February 20 – In Britain, storms damage the Crystal Palace and cause the collapse of the steeple of Chichester Cathedral.
- February 21 – Mariehamn, the capital of Åland, is founded.
- February 23 – President-elect Abraham Lincoln arrives secretly in Washington, D.C. in light of suspicions of a conspiracy in Baltimore to kill him.
- February 24 – Battle of Ky Hoa: the French and the Spanish defeat the Vietnamese.
- February 27 – Russian troops fire upon a crowd in Warsaw protesting Russian rule over Poland, killing 5 protesters.
- February 28 – Colorado is organized as a United States territory.
- March 2
  - Nevada is organized as a United States territory.
  - American Civil War: Texas is admitted to the Confederate States of America.

=== March ===
- March 3 (February 19 O.S.) – Emancipation reform of 1861: Alexander II abolishes serfdom in the Russian Empire.

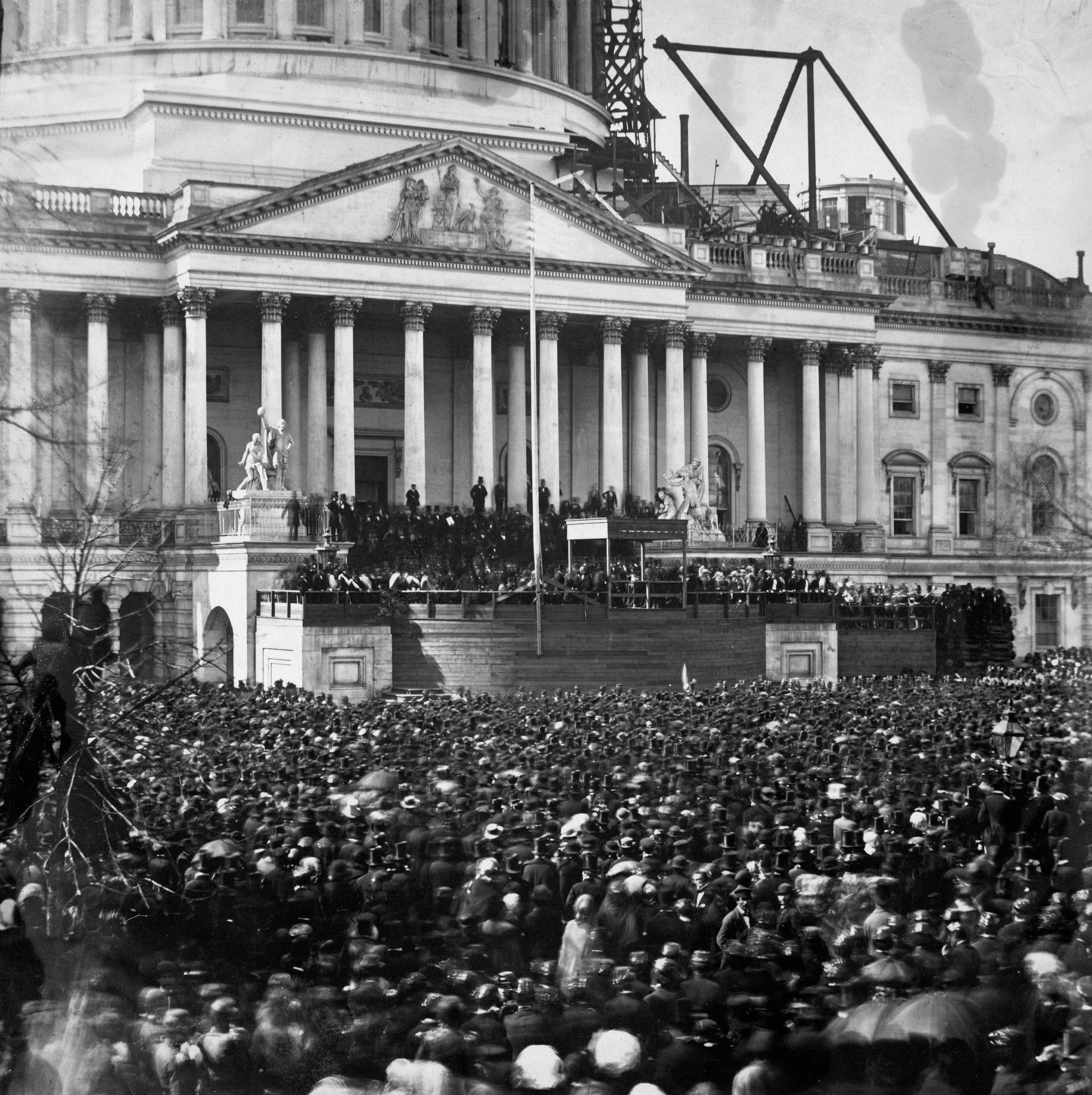
March 4: Lincoln inaugurated

March 4: Confederate flag

1861: American Civil War

- March 4
  - Abraham Lincoln is sworn in as the 16th president of the United States.
  - American Civil War: The "Stars and Bars" is adopted as the flag of the Confederate States of America.
- March 10 – El Hadj Umar Tall seizes the city of Ségou, destroying the Bamana Empire of Mali.
- March 11 – American Civil War: The Constitution of the Confederate States of America is adopted.
- March 13 – Tsushima incident: The Russian corvette Posadnik arrives at Tsushima Island in the Korea Strait, Japan, provoking a reaction from the Japanese Shogunate.
- March 17 – Unification of Italy: The Kingdom of Italy is proclaimed by the new Parliament, with Victor Emmanuel II of Piedmont-Sardinia becoming its king.
- March 19 – The First Taranaki War ends in New Zealand.
- March 20
  - Unification of Italy: The surrender of Civitella del Tronto ends the Kingdom of the Two Sicilies.
  - An earthquake completely destroys Mendoza, Argentina.
- March 21 – Alexander Stephens, Vice President of the Confederacy, gives the infamous Cornerstone Speech in Savannah, Georgia, in which he declares that slavery is the natural condition of blacks, and the foundation of the Confederacy.
- March 28 – Confederate Arizona: A convention in modern-day Tucson ratifies the ordinance of secession of the southern part of New Mexico Territory.
- March 30 – Discovery of the chemical elements: British chemist William Crookes announces his discovery of thallium.

=== April ===
- April 7 – A population census is taken in the United Kingdom. The population is more than double that of 1801 and those living in urban areas are in a majority.

American Civil War:

  - April 12 – The American Civil War begins with the bombardment of Fort Sumter, South Carolina.
  - April 13 – Fort Sumter surrenders to Southern forces.
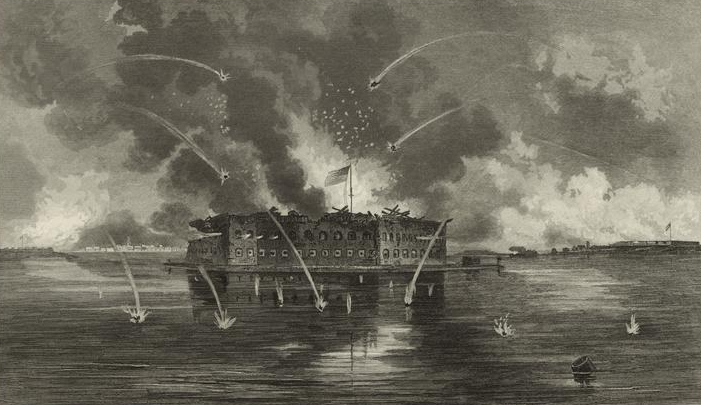
    April 12–13: Fort Sumter
  - April 15 – President Abraham Lincoln issues a Proclamation calling for 75,000 men to confront in the South, "combinations too powerful to be suppressed in the ordinary way".
  - April 17 – Virginia secedes from the Union.
  - April 20 – Robert E. Lee resigns his commission in the United States Army, in order to command the forces of the state of Virginia.
- April 24 (N.S.) – Bezdna unrest: Bezdna in Russia is the scene of a peasant uprising; the military open fire and about 90 are killed.
- April 25 – American Civil War: The Union Army arrives in Washington, D.C.
- April 26 – Giovanni Schiaparelli discovers the asteroid 69 Hesperia.
- April 27 – American Civil War: President Abraham Lincoln suspends the writ of habeas corpus in the United States.

=== May ===
American Civil War:

  - May 6 – Arkansas secedes from the Union.
  - May 7 – Tennessee secedes from the Union.
  - May 8 – Richmond, Virginia, is named the capital of the Confederate States of America.
- May 10 – The Royal Seminary is granted its constitution as the first public institution of higher academic learning open to women in Sweden.
- May 13
  - North Star affair: The British merchant ship North Star leaves Hong Kong for Nagasaki, Japan. Chinese pirates board the vessel, kill an officer, and escape with a large quantity of gold.
  - American Civil War: Queen Victoria of the United Kingdom issues a "proclamation of neutrality", which recognizes the breakaway states as having belligerent rights.
  - Comet C/1861 J1 (the "Great Comet of 1861") is discovered from Australia.
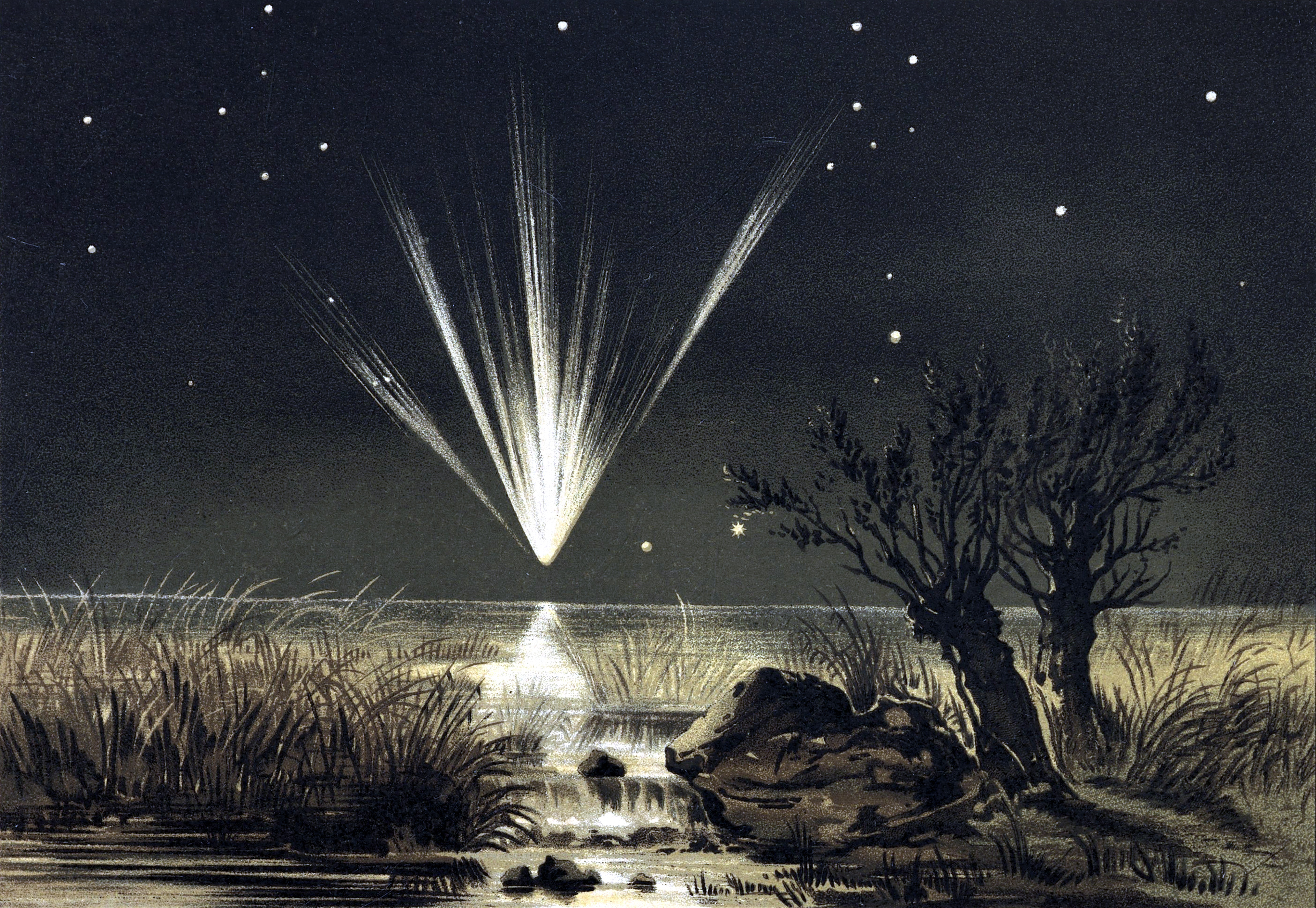
    May 13: Great Comet
- May 14 – The Canellas meteorite, an 859 gram chondrite type meteorite, strikes Earth near Barcelona, Spain.
- May 17
  - A 7-day working men's package holiday to Paris, organised by Thomas Cook, sets out from London Bridge station.
  - Scottish-born physicist James Clerk Maxwell demonstrates the principle of permanent three-colour photography in a lecture at the Royal Institution in London using a photograph captured by Thomas Sutton.
- May 20 – American Civil War:
  - Kentucky proclaims its neutrality, which lasts until September 3, when Confederate forces enter the state.
  - North Carolina secedes from the Union.
- May 21 – Russian sailors clash with a group of Japanese samurai and farmers at Tsushima Island.
- May 23 – American Civil War: The state of Virginia's ordinance of secession from the United States is ratified in a referendum.
- May 29 – The Hong Kong General Chamber of Commerce is established.
- May 31 – The Perpetual Truce of Peace and Friendship is signed between Bahrain and the United Kingdom.

=== June ===
- June 3 – The Battle of Philippi, A skirmish in West Virginia, involving over 3,000 soldiers was the first battle of the American Civil War.
- June 9 – Règlement Organique: With the approval of European powers, the Mount Lebanon Mutasarrifate is established as a semi-autonomous sub-division separate from the Sidon Eyalet. An Ottoman Armenian, Davud Pasha, is appointed Mutasarrıf by the Ottoman Sultan.
- June 10 – The skirmish of Big Bethel, is the first land battle of the American Civil War and was a portent of the carnage that was to come.
- June 15 – Benito Juárez is formally elected President of Mexico; he temporarily stops the payments of foreign debt.
- June 22 – Tooley Street fire breaks out and takes the life of James Braidwood, first superintendent of the London Fire Brigade.
- June 25 – Abdülmecid I, Sultan of the Ottoman Empire (1839–1861) dies and is succeeded by Abdülaziz (1861–1876).
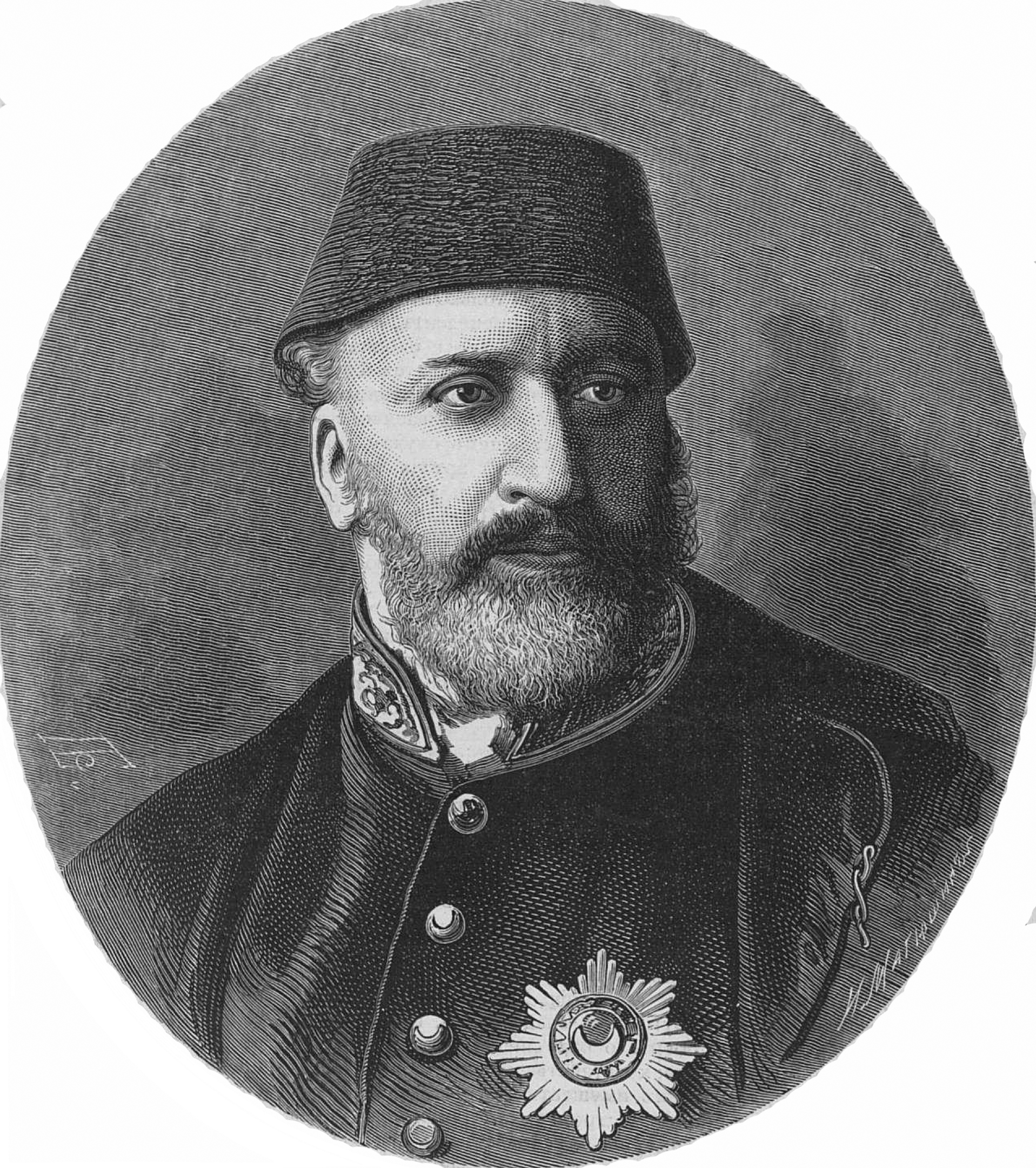
  June 25: Abdülaziz
- June 30 – Lambing Flat riots: White miners attack Chinese in the Australian goldfields.

=== July ===
- July 1
  - The first issue of the Vatican's newspaper L'Osservatore Romano is published.
  - Taiping Rebellion: Battle of Shanghai – French and Imperial Chinese troops defeat Taiping forces.
  - In Cologne, the Wallraf–Richartz Museum of art opens.
- July 2 – Ivan Kasatkin lands on Hakodate, and introduces the Eastern Orthodox Church into Japan.
- American Civil War:
  - July 11 – The Battle of Rich Mountain, was one of the early battles of the American Civil War.
  - July 12 – The Confederate States sign a Treaty with Choctaws and Chickasaws in Indian Territory.
  - July 13 – The Battle of Corrick's Ford takes place in western Virginia.
  - July 21 – First Battle of Bull Run – At Manassas Junction, Virginia, the first major battle of the war ends in a Confederate victory.
  - July 25 – The Crittenden–Johnson Resolution is passed by the U.S. Congress, stating that the war is being fought to preserve the Union, and not to end slavery.
  - July 26 – George B. McClellan assumes command of the Army of the Potomac, following the disastrous Union defeat at the First Battle of Bull Run.

=== August ===
- August 1 – The first public weather forecast: measured and predicted correctly by Admiral Robert FitzRoy in Britain.
- August 5 – American Civil War:
  - In order to help pay for the war effort, the United States government issues the first income tax as part of the Revenue Act of 1861 (3% of all incomes over US$800; rescinded in 1872).
  - The U.S. Army abolishes flogging.
- August 6 – Lagos Treaty of Cession between the British Empire and Dosunmu, Oba of Lagos, by which the latter, under threat of military bombardment, cedes Lagos Island to Britain, whilst retaining his title and powers, subject to English law, and allowing the British Royal Navy's West Africa Squadron to have a base there to prevent the slave trade.
- August 10 – American Civil War: The first major battle west of the Mississippi River, the Battle of Wilson's Creek, is fought, with a Confederate victory.
- August 15 – First description of Archaeopteryx, based on a feather found in Bavaria; in September the first complete identified skeleton is found near Langenaltheim in Germany.
- August 19 – Weisshorn, the fifth highest summit in the Alps, is first ascended.
- August 20–22 – The first modern Welsh National Eisteddfod takes place in Aberdare.
- August 27 – Martin Doyle is the last person executed in Britain for attempted murder.
- August 28 - 29 – Hatteras Inlet, North Carolina.

=== September ===
- American Civil War:
  - September 3 – Confederate General Leonidas Polk invades neutral Kentucky, prompting the state legislature to ask for Union assistance.
  - September 6 – Forces under Union General Ulysses S. Grant bloodlessly capture Paducah, Kentucky, which gives the Union control of the mouth of the Tennessee River.
  - September 10 – Carnifax Ferry, West Virginia.
- September 17 – Argentine Civil War: Battle of Pavón: Victory of Buenos Aires over the Argentine Confederation, and the re-unification of Argentina.

=== October ===
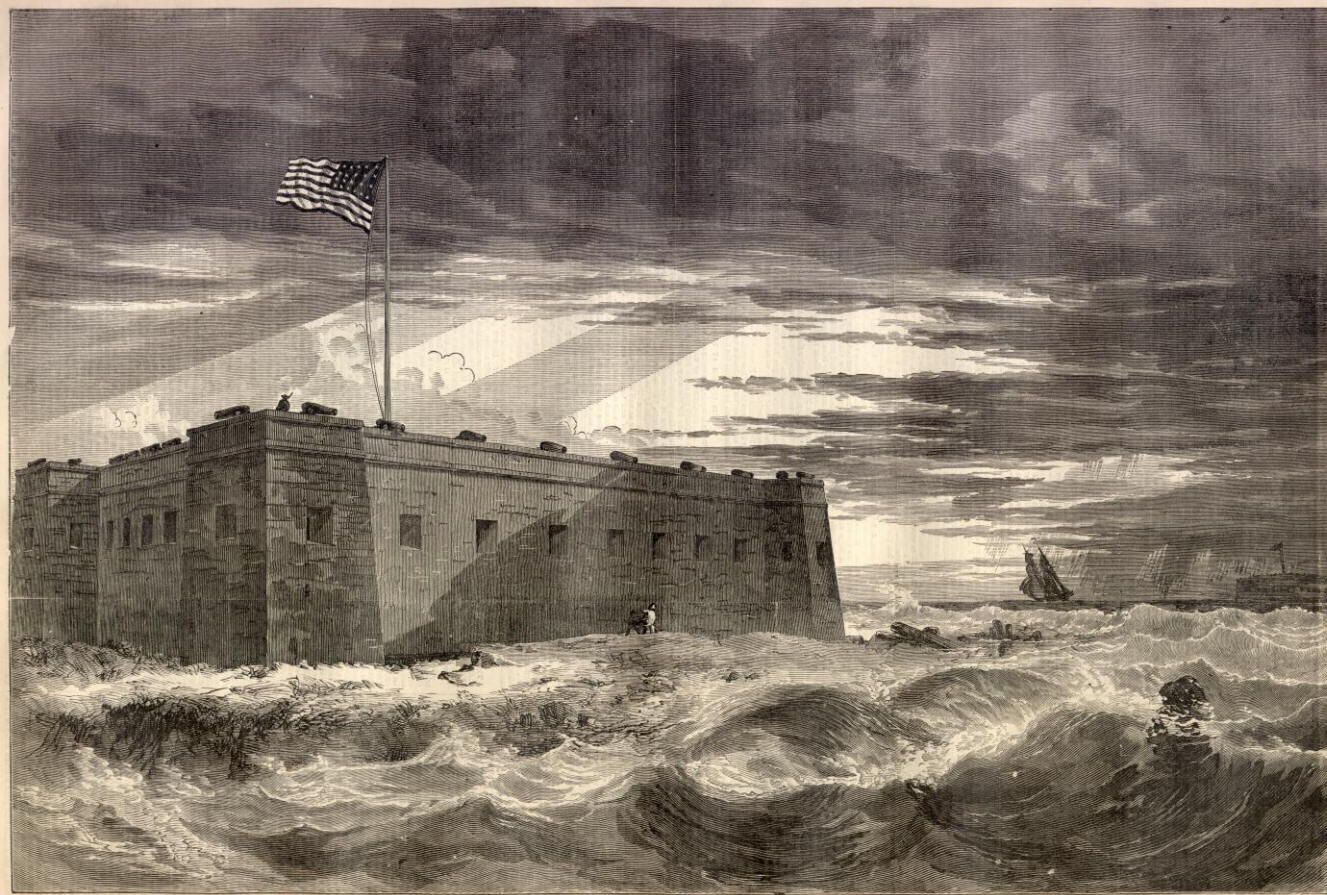
October 9: Battle of Santa Rosa Island

- October 9 – American Civil War: Battle of Santa Rosa Island – Confederate forces are defeated in their effort to take the island.
- October 17 – Australian frontier wars: Cullin-la-ringo massacre – 19 white settlers are murdered by indigenous Australians, following which more than 300 of the latter are killed in retaliation.
- October 21 – American Civil War: Battle of Ball's Bluff – Union forces under Colonel Edward Baker are defeated by Confederate troops, in the second major battle of the war. Baker, a close friend of Abraham Lincoln, is also killed in the fighting.
- October 24
  - HMS Warrior, the world's first ocean-going (all) iron-hulled armored battleship, is completed and commissioned into the British Royal Navy.
  - Western Union completes the first transcontinental telegraph line across the United States.
- October 25 – The Toronto Stock Exchange is established in Canada.
- October 26 – The Pony Express American transcontinental mail service announces its closure.
- American Civil War:
  - October 28 – The Missouri legislature takes up a bill for Missouri's secession from the Union.
  - October 30 – The bill for Missouri's secession from the Union is passed.
- October 31
  - The Spanish, French and British governments sign a tripartite agreement to intervene in Mexico, in the hope of recovering unpaid debts.
  - The Missouri secession bill is signed by Governor Jackson.
  - American Civil War: Citing failing health, 75-year-old Union General Winfield Scott resigns as Commander of the United States Army.

=== November ===
- November 1 – U.S. President Abraham Lincoln appoints George B. McClellan as commander of the Union Army, replacing Winfield Scott.
- November 2 – American Civil War: Western Department Union General John C. Frémont is relieved of command and replaced by David Hunter.
- November 4 – The University of Washington is founded in Seattle.
- November 5 – The first Melbourne Cup horse race is held in Melbourne, Australia.
- American Civil War:
  - November 6 – Jefferson Davis is elected president of the Confederate States of America.
  - November 7 – Battle of Belmont – In Belmont, Missouri, Union forces led by General Ulysses S. Grant (in his first combat leadership role) overrun a Confederate camp, but are forced to retreat when Confederate reinforcements arrive.
  - November 8 – Trent Affair – The USS San Jacinto stops the United Kingdom mail ship Trent, and arrests two Confederate envoys, James Mason and John Slidell, sparking a diplomatic crisis between the U.K. and U.S.
- November 10 – Death of French explorer Henri Mouhot, following which his servant Phrai begins shipping his diaries and specimens back to the west; they include accounts of Mouhot's discovery of Angkor Wat.
- November 11 – The Tongzhi Emperor succeeds to the throne of China at the age of 5. His mother, Empress Dowager Cixi, becomes co-regent and will be the power behind the imperial throne for almost 50 years.
- American Civil War:
  - November 19 – Battle of Round Mountain in Indian Territory (modern-day Oklahoma).
  - November 21 – Confederate President Jefferson Davis appoints Judah P. Benjamin Secretary of War.
- November 25
  - At a battle in the Sundarbans of Bengal, the house of Rahimullah of Baraikhali is attacked and he and 33 others are killed.
  - A tenement collapses in the Old Town, Edinburgh (Scotland), killing 35 people, while 15 others survive.
- November 28 – Acting on the ordinance passed by the Jackson government, the Confederate Congress admits Missouri as the 12th Confederate state.

=== December ===
- December 1 – American Civil War: Trent Affair – The British government dispatches its response, partly drafted by Prince Albert (a fortnight before his death).
- December 10
  - American Civil War: A rebel government representing Kentucky is accepted into the Confederate States of America, although Kentucky officially remains part of the United States.
  - In southern French Indochina, resistance forces led by Nguyễn Trung Trực ambush, board and sink the French lorcha (boat) L'Esperance on the Nhat Tao canal.
- December 21 – Medal of Honor: Public Resolution 82, containing a provision for a Navy Medal of Valor, is signed into law by U.S. President Abraham Lincoln.

=== Undated ===
- The first industrial meat packing plant in Uruguay is established, at Fray Bentos.
- Statistically, this year is considered the end of the whale oil industry and (in replacement) the beginning of the petroleum oil industry.

== Births ==
=== January–June ===
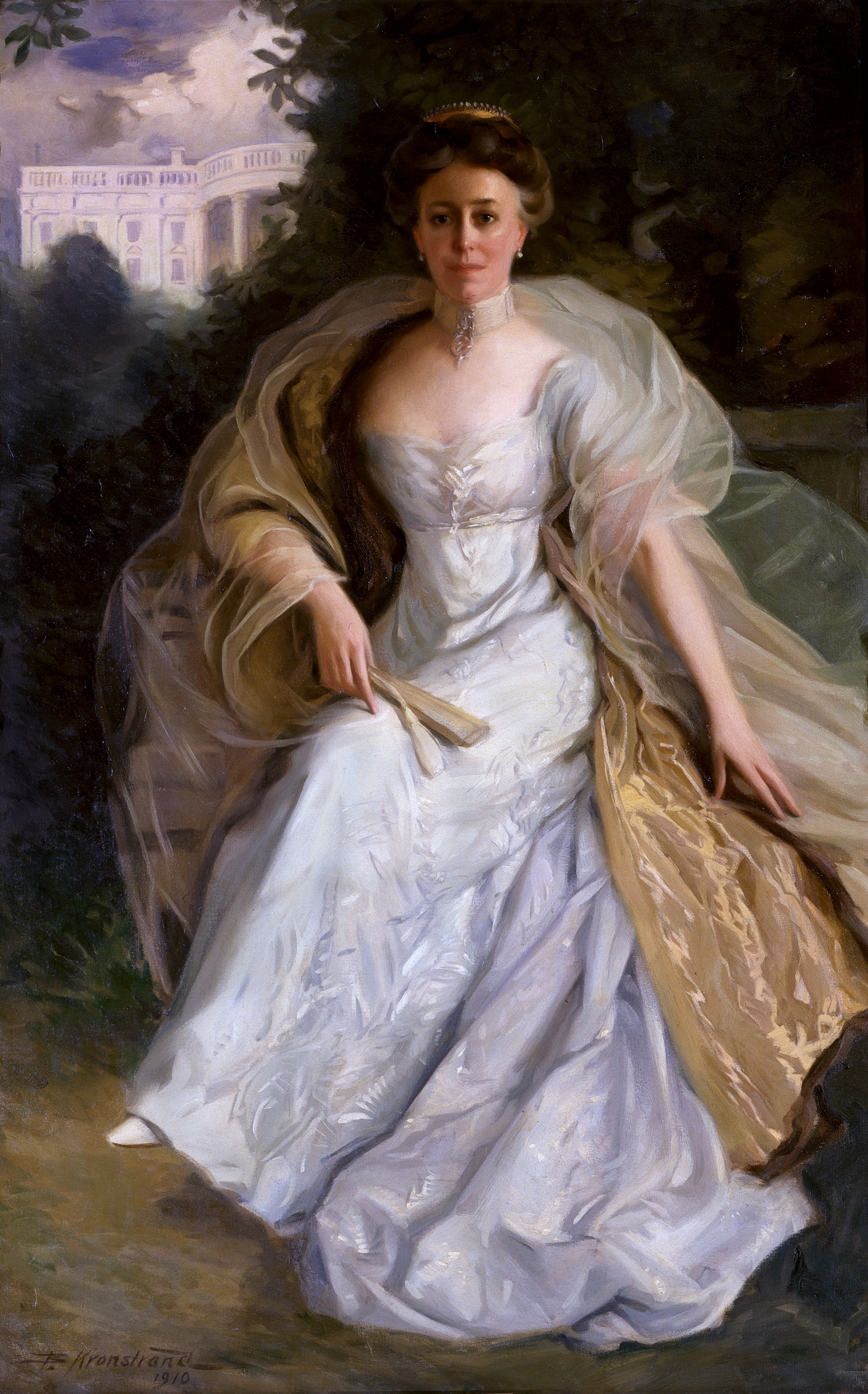
Helen Herron Taft

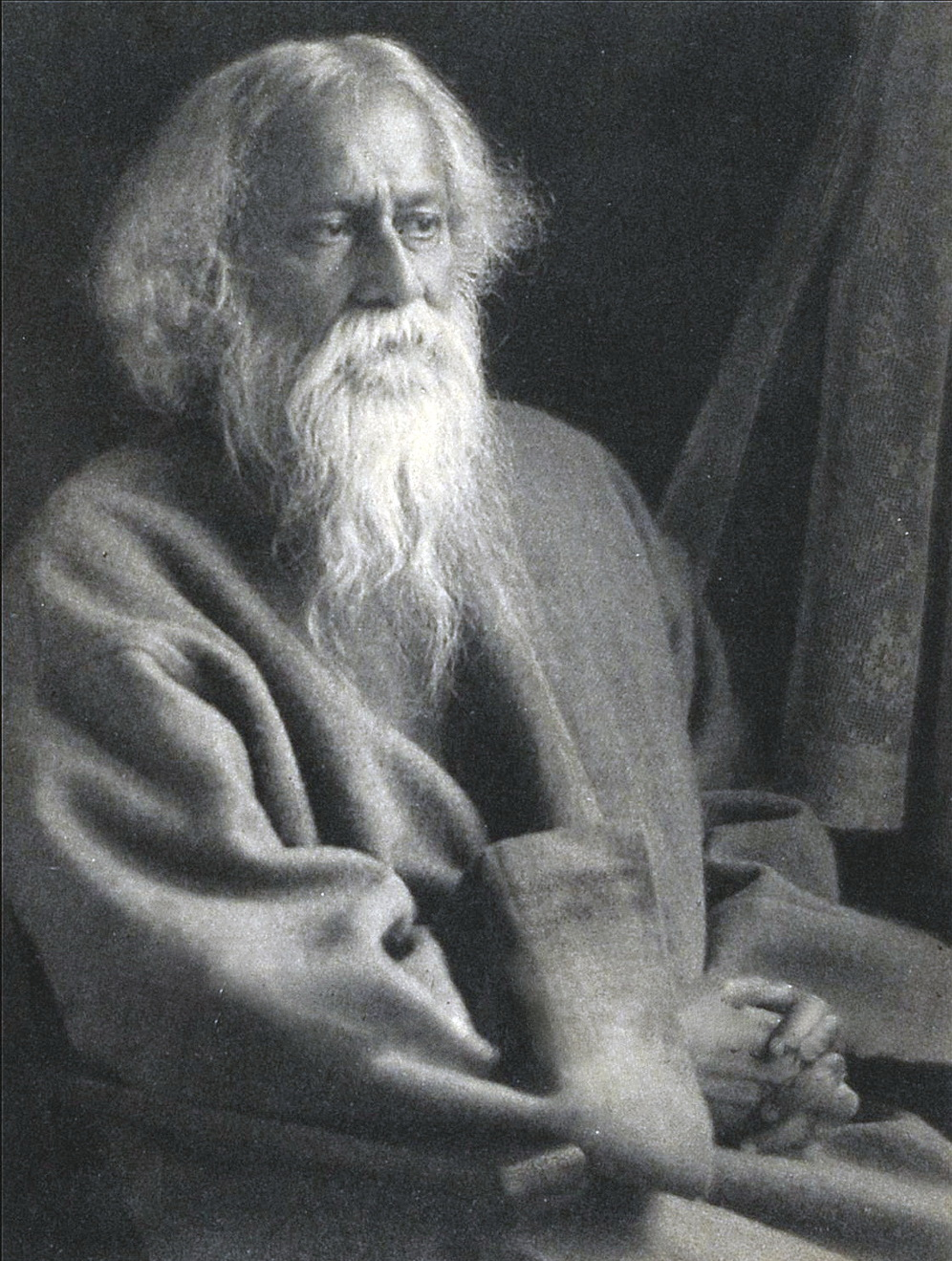
Rabindranath Tagore

- January 5 – Robert Lee Bullard, American general (d. 1947)
- January 6 – Victor Horta, Belgian architect and designer (d. 1947)
- January 10 – Germogen (Maximov), Russian Orthodox Metropolitan (d. 1945)
- January 14 – Mehmed VI, Ottoman Sultan (d. 1926)
- January 27 – Constantin Prezan, Romanian general, Marshal of Romania (d. 1943)
- January 28
  - Julián Felipe, Filipino musician, bandleader (d. 1944)
  - Ramón Meza y Suárez Inclán, Cuban literary critic, historian, professor and author (d. 1911)
- January 30 – Charles Martin Loeffler, American composer (d. 1935)
- February 12 – Lou Andreas-Salomé, Russian-born author (d. 1937)
- February 15
  - Charles Édouard Guillaume, French physicist, Nobel Prize laureate (d. 1938)
  - Alfred North Whitehead, English mathematician and philosopher (d. 1947)
- February 17 – Princess Helena of Waldeck and Pyrmont, Duchess of Albany, German-born member of the British royal family (d. 1922)
- February 19 – Henry Horne, 1st Baron Horne, British general (d. 1929)
- February 22
  - Lewis Akeley, American academic (d. 1961)
  - Mabelle Biggart, American elocutionist (unknown year of death)
  - Katō Tomosaburō, Imperial Japanese Navy officer, 12th Prime Minister of Japan (d. 1923)
- February 26 – King Ferdinand I of Bulgaria (d. 1948)
- February 27 – Rudolf Steiner, Austrian philosopher, social reformer and author (d. 1925)
- March 2 – Nikola Ivanov, Bulgarian general (d. 1940)
- March 21 – Charles Swickard, German-American film director (d. 1929)
- April 3 – Alice Sollier, French doctor, first Black French woman to qualify as a medical doctor (d. 1942)
- April 6 – Stanislas de Guaita, French poet (d. 1897)
- April 8 – Son Byong-hi, Korean independence activist (d. 1922)
- April 15 – Bliss Carman, Canadian poet (d. 1929)
- April 22 – István Tisza, 2-time prime minister of Hungary (d. 1918)
- April 22 – Hinke Bergegren, Swedish anarchist and birth control agitator (d. 1936)
- April 23 – Edmund Allenby, 1st Viscount Allenby, British soldier, administrator (d. 1936)
- April 26 – Rudolf Stöger-Steiner von Steinstätten, Austro-Hungarian general and politician (d. 1921)
- May 5 – Peter Cooper Hewitt, American electrical engineer, inventor (d. 1921)
- May 7 – Rabindranath Tagore, Poet, novelist, dramatist, essayist, story-writer, composer, painter, philosopher, social reformer, educationist, linguist, grammarian, and Nobel Prize in Literature laureate for the collection of poems Gitanjali. (d. 1941)
- May 11 – Frederick Russell Burnham, American scouter (d. 1947)
- May 14 – Harro Magnussen, German sculptor (d. 1908)
- May 16 – Herman Webster Mudgett (alias H. H. Holmes), American serial killer (d. 1896)
- May 24 – Gerald Strickland, 4th prime minister of Malta, 23rd Governor of New South Wales, 15th Governor of Western Australia and 9th Governor of Tasmania (d. 1940)
- June 2 – Helen Herron Taft, First Lady of the United States (d. 1943)
- June 19 – José Rizal, Filipino national hero (d. 1896)
- June 20 – Frederick Gowland Hopkins, English biochemist, recipient of the Nobel Prize in Physiology or Medicine (d. 1947)
- June 22 – Maximilian von Spee, German admiral (d. 1914)
- June 27 – Fanny Davies, Guernesiaise pianist (d. 1934)

=== July–December ===
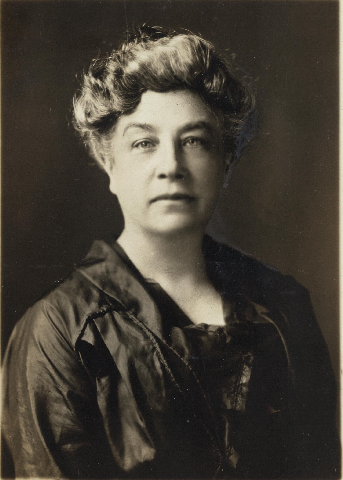
Kate M. Gordon

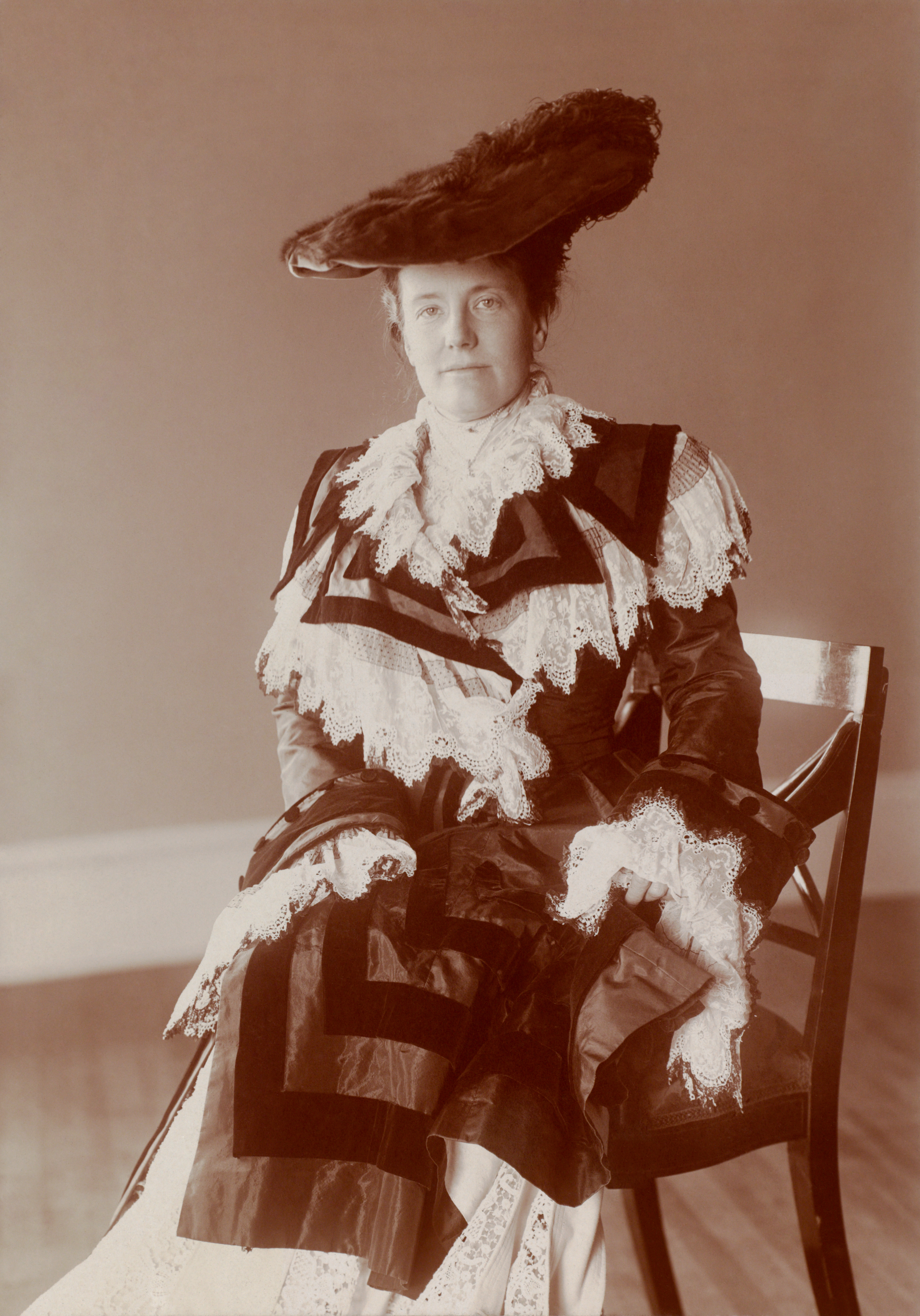
Edith Roosevelt

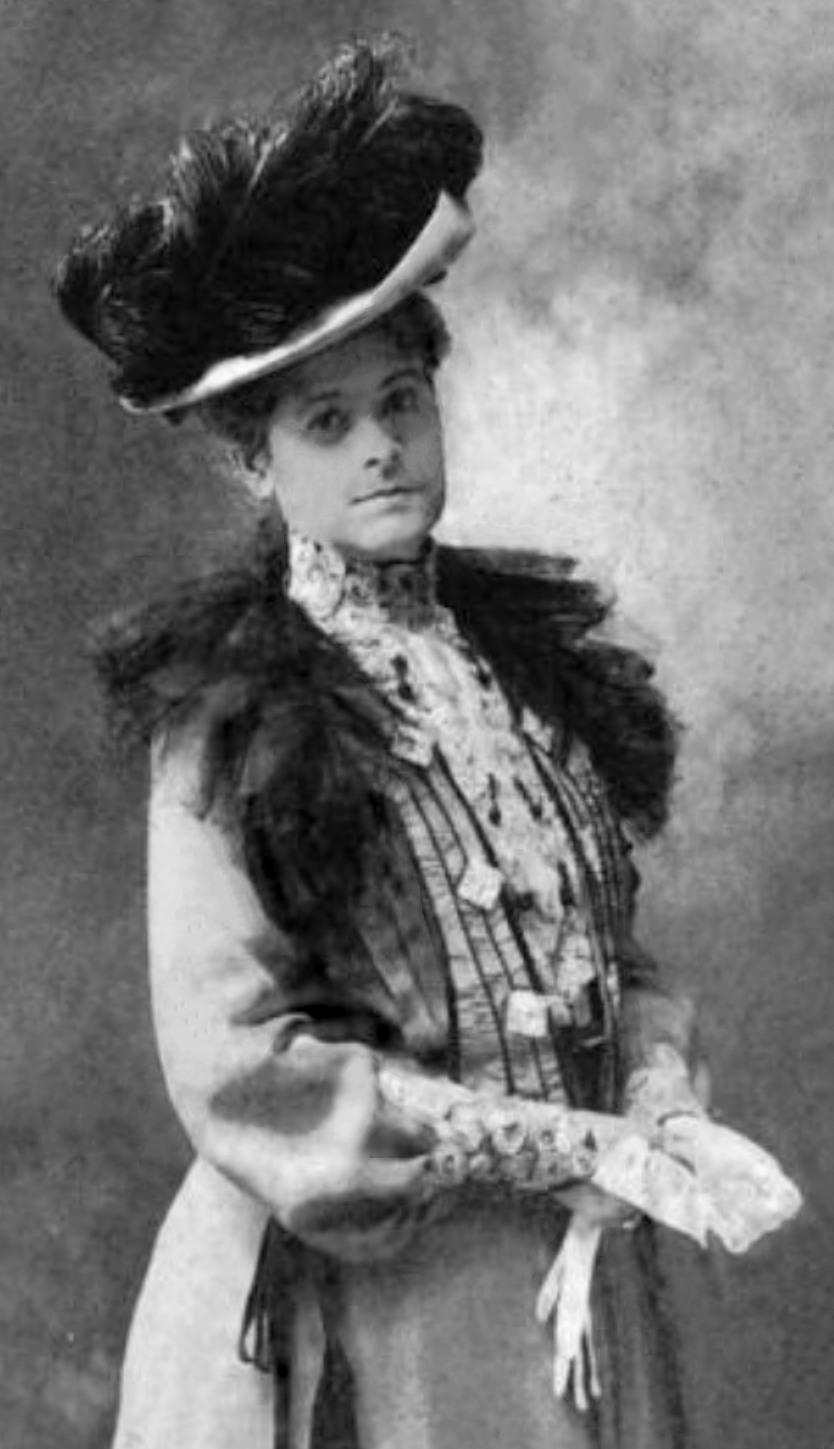
Myra Belle Martin

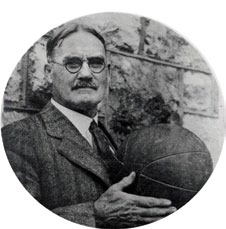
James Naismith

- July 7 – Nettie Stevens, American geneticist credited with the discovery of sex chromosomes (d. 1912)
- July 14 – Kate M. Gordon, American suffragette (d. 1932)
  - July 18 – Kadambini Ganguly, first Indian female doctor (d. 1923)
- August 2 – Edith Cowan, Australian social reformer and politician (d. 1932)
- August 4
  - Henry Head, English neurologist (d. 1940)
  - Daniel Edward Howard, 16th president of Liberia (d. 1935)
- August 6 – Edith Roosevelt, First Lady of the United States (d. 1948)
- August 7 – Spencer S. Wood, United States Navy rear admiral (d. 1940)
- August 9 – Dorothea Klumpke, American astronomer, Director of the Bureau of Measurements at the Paris Observatory (d. 1942)
- August 10 – Almroth Wright, British bacteriologist, immunologist (d. 1947)
- August 24 – Simon de Graaff, Dutch civil servant, politician (d. 1948)
- September 2 – Henrietta Crosman, American stage, film actress (d. 1944)
- September 7 – Patriarch Ambrosius of Georgia (d. 1927)
- September 10 – Niels Hansen Jacobsen, Danish sculptor, ceramist (d. 1941)
- September 11
  - Juhani Aho, Finnish author, journalist (d. 1921)
  - Erich von Falkenhayn, German general (d. 1922)
- September 15
  - M. Visvesvaraya, Indian civil engineer (d. 1962)
- September 23
  - Robert Bosch, German industrialist, engineer and inventor (d. 1942)
  - Mary Elizabeth Coleridge, British poet, novelist (d. 1907)
- September 30
  - Morgan Robertson, American author (d. 1915)
  - William Wrigley Jr., American chewing gum industrialist (d. 1932)
- October 4 – Frederic Remington, American cowboy artist, sculptor (d. 1909)
- October 6 – Myra Belle Martin, American financier (d. 1936)
- October 10 – Fridtjof Nansen, Norwegian explorer, scientist and humanitarian, Nobel Prize laureate (d. 1930)
- October 16 – J. B. Bury, British historian (d. 1927)
- October 24 – Alexey Kaledin, Russian general (d. 1918)
- October 30 – Antoine Bourdelle, French sculptor (d. 1929)
- November 4
  - Dimitrios Ioannou, Greek general (d. 1926)
  - Alice Gossage, American journalist (d. 1929)
- November 6 – James Naismith, Canadian inventor of basketball (d. 1939)
- November 14
  - William Allardyce, British colonial governor (d. 1930)
  - Frederick Jackson Turner, American historian (d. 1932)
- November 16 – Georgina Febres-Cordero, Venezuelan nun (d. 1925)
- November 23 – Clara H. Hazelrigg, American author, educator and reformer (d. 1937)
- November 24 – August Bier, German surgeon (d. 1949)
- December 4
  - Lillian Russell, American singer, vaudeville star (d. 1922)
  - Hannes Hafstein, 1st Prime Minister of Iceland (d. 1922)
- December 5 – Armando Diaz, Italian general, Marshal of Italy (d. 1928)
- December 7 – Henri Mathias Berthelot, French general (d. 1931)
- December 8
  - Aristide Maillol, French sculptor (d. 1944)
  - Georges Méliès, French film director (d. 1938)
- December 15 – Pehr Evind Svinhufvud, Prime Minister and President of Finland (d. 1944)
- December 16 – Antonio de La Gándara, French painter (d. 1917)
- December 20 – Ivana Kobilca, Slovenian painter (d. 1926)
- December 29 – Kurt Hensel, German mathematician (d. 1941)

=== Date unknown ===
- Dixie Haygood, American magician (d. 1915)
- Kallirhoe Parren, founder of the Greek women's movement (d. 1940)
- Victoire Jean-Baptiste, Haitian politician (d. 1923)
- Abba Jifar II, king of the Gibe Kingdom of Jimma (d. 1932)

== Deaths ==
=== January–June ===
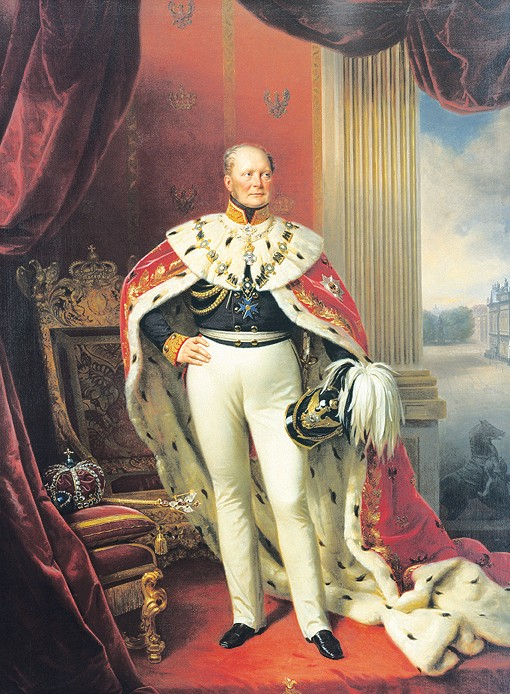
Frederick William IV of Prussia

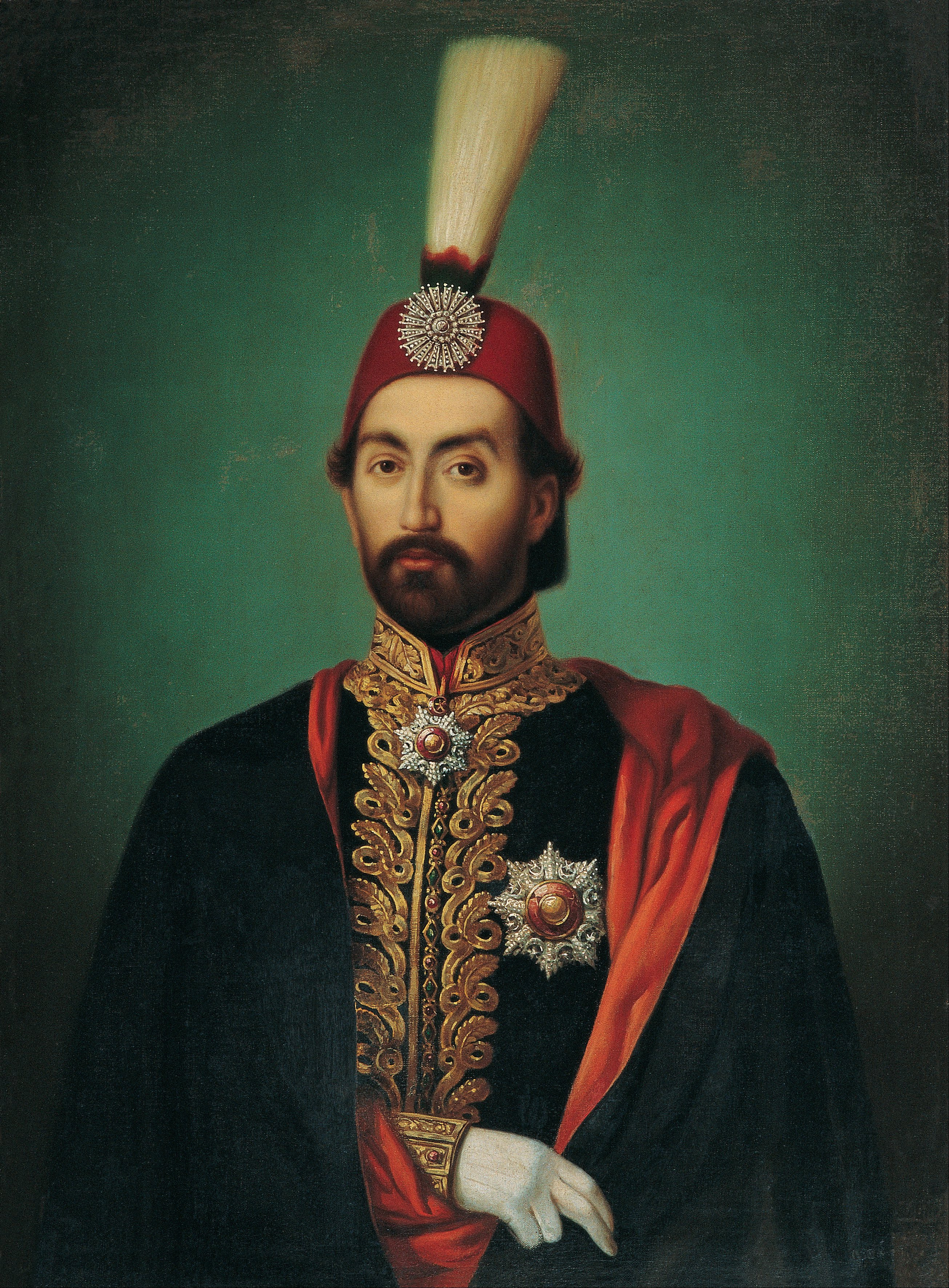
Abdülmecid I

- January 2 – King Frederick William IV of Prussia (b. 1795)
- January 17 – Lola Montez, Irish-born dancer, mistress of King Ludwig I of Bavaria (b. 1821)
- January 19 – Albert Niemann, German chemist (b. 1834)
- February 5 – Pierre Bosquet, French general, Marshal of France (b. 1810)
- February 26 – Wojciech Chrzanowski, Polish general (b. 1793)
- March 10 – Taras Shevchenko, Ukrainian poet (b. 1814)
- March 16 – Princess Victoria, Duchess of Kent and Strathearn, mother of Queen Victoria (b. 1786)
- April 8 – Elisha Otis, American engineer, Founder of Otis (b. 1811)
- April 15 – Isaiah Stillman, U.S. Army Major in the Black Hawk War (b. 1793)
- May 29 – Joachim Lelewel, Polish nationalist historian (b. 1786)
- June 3 – Stephen A. Douglas, American senator from Illinois, Democratic presidential candidate (b. 1813)
- June 6 – Camillo Benso, Count of Cavour, 1st prime minister of Italy (b. 1810)
- June 13 – Richard Lawrence, failed assassin of Andrew Jackson (b. 1800)
- June 25 – Abdülmecid I, Ottoman sultan (b. 1823)
- June 26 – Pavel Jozef Šafárik, Slovak philologist (b. 1795)
- June 29 – Elizabeth Barrett Browning, English poet (b. 1806)

=== July–December ===
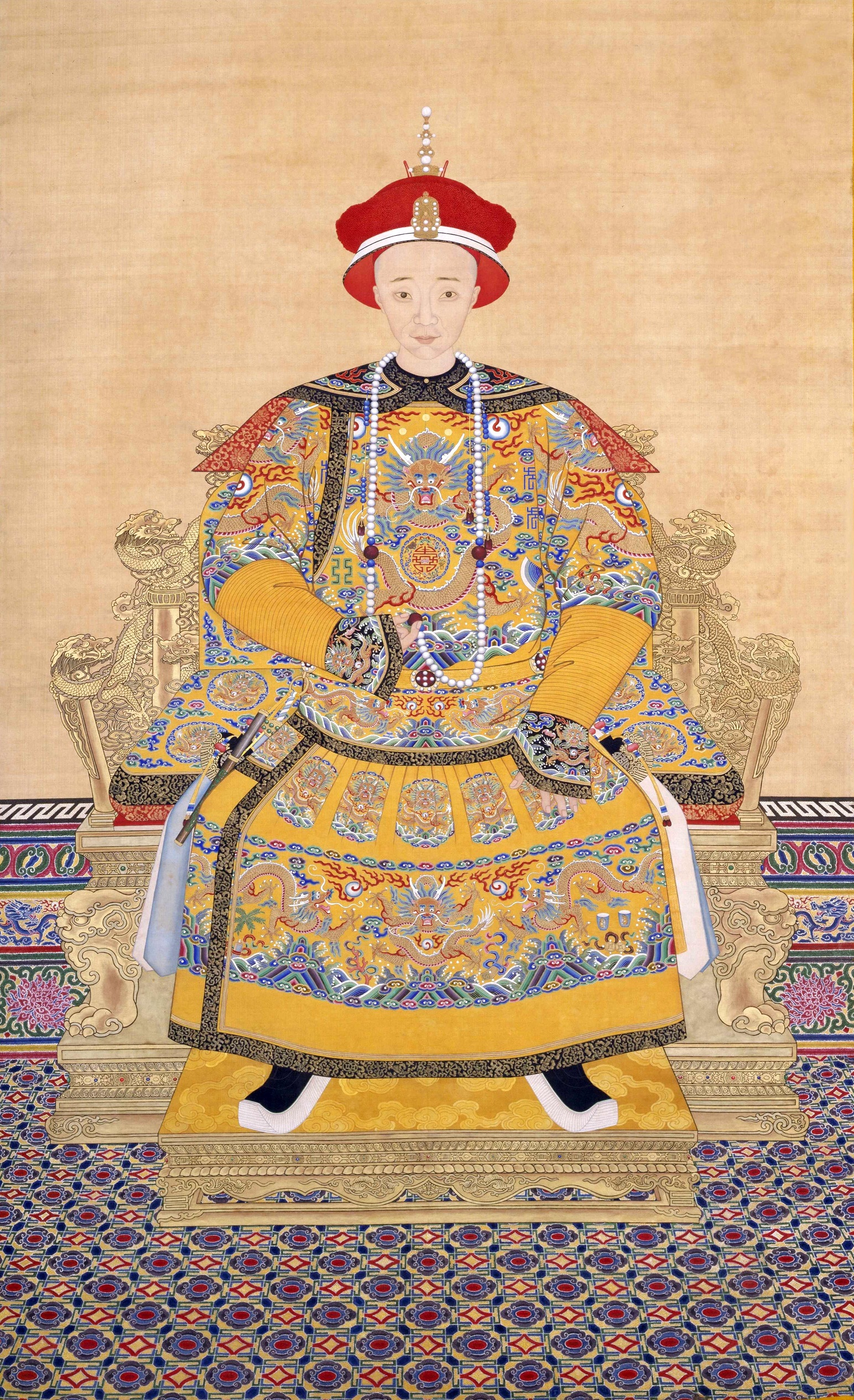
Xianfeng Emperor

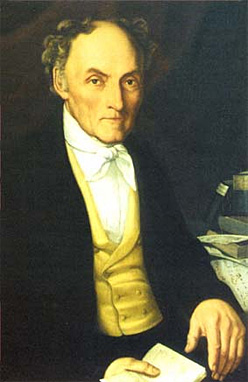
Ernst Anschütz

- July 22 – Barnard Elliott Bee Jr., Confederate general (b. 1824)
- July 25 – Jonas Furrer, member of the Swiss Federal Council (b. 1805)
- August 10 – Nathaniel Lyon, first Union Army General to die in combat in the American Civil War (b. 1818)
- August 12 – Eliphalet Remington, American gunsmith, founder of Remington Arms (b. 1793)
- August 17 – Alcée Louis la Branche, American politician (b. 1806)
- August 22 – Xianfeng Emperor, 9th emperor of the Qing dynasty (b. 1831)
- August 24 – Pierre Berthier, French geologist (b. 1782)
- August 28 – William Lyon Mackenzie, Scottish journalist, 1st Mayor of Toronto (b. 1795)
- September 7 – Willie Person Mangum, American politician (b. 1792)
- October 4 – Archibald Montgomerie, 13th Earl of Eglinton, British politician (b. 1812)
- October 5 – Antoni Melchior Fijałkowski, Polish bishop (b. 1778)
- October 10 – Phoebe Hinsdale Brown, American hymnwriter (b. 1783)
- October 26 – Edward "Ned" Kendall, American bandleader, instrumentalist (keyed bugle) (b. 1808)
- October 31 – Guillermo (William) Miller, English-born military leader in Peru (b. 1795)
- November 7 – Isobel Gunn, Scottish business person (b. 1780)
- November 11 – King Pedro V of Portugal (b. 1837)
- November 13 – Arthur Hugh Clough, English poet (b. 1819)
- November 25 – Rahimullah, Bengali rebel leader
- December 14 – Prince Albert, husband of Queen Victoria (b. 1819)
- December 18 – Ernst Anschütz, German teacher, organist, poet and composer (b. 1780)
