= Ramón Suárez =

Ramón Suárez may refer to:

- Ramón Suárez Picallo (1894–1964), Spanish politician, member of the Partido Galeguista (1931)
- Ramón M. Suárez Calderon (1895–1981), Puerto Rican physician
- Ramón Suárez González (born 1949), Chilean politician
- Ramón Suárez del Valle (born 1968), Spanish footballer, brother of Juanma (footballer, born 1966)

== See also ==
- Ramón Meza y Suárez Inclán (1861–1911), Cuban writer and academic
