= Mattie Lee Price =

American performance artist (1869–1899)

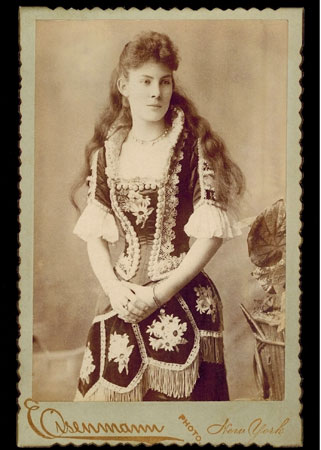
- Price, c. 1893
- Born: May 1869 near Rome, Georgia, U.S.
- Died: 11 March 1899 (aged 29); Fulham District, London, United Kingdom
- Other names: Gaza, The Georgia Wonder, The Georgia Magnetic Girl, The Georgia Electric Girl
- Occupation: Stage Magician
- Years active: 15

Mattie Lee Price (1869–1899) of Bartow County, Georgia, United States, was just 14 when she became the second of the Georgia Wonder girls to come out of Georgia, USA during the winter of 1883–1884. Georgia Wonder girls were pre-vaudeville acts in which the young women performed feats of strength, usually pitted against men. They used fulcrum and leverage techniques to lift heavy men in chairs, twist hickory sticks out of strong men's hands, and other feats of strength. There were variations of the act that included balance tests. "Lulu" Hurst (born Lula Hurst), of Polk County, who was 15 at the time she began her act, started the phenomenon. She gave a magic demonstration at her father's farm in late December 1883. Dixie Haygood, with the stage name of Annie Abbott, was also a famous Georgia stage magician, performing an almost identical act.

== Early life ==
Mattie Lee Price was born in May 1869 near Rome, Georgia. Around 1874, when Price was about five years old, her mother and two siblings died in an incident that was not identified in contemporary sources. Her father later remarried, and Price was raised by her father and stepmother, Elizabeth Penland.

Price received little formal education. Contemporary accounts reported that she was illiterate and had never ridden on a train before making her stage debut at age 14. She was frequently described in newspaper profiles as slender, with gray eyes and unusually coloured hair.

== Career ==
=== Early career ===
At age 14, Price made her public debut at the historic Stilesboro Academy in Stilesboro, Georgia, in late January 1884. She was the second performer to emerge during the Georgia Wonder phenomenon, which began in Georgia in late 1883. Price was one of the Georgia Wonder girls, young women who performed apparent feats of strength, usually against men, using balance, leverage, and fulcrum techniques.

Within weeks of her debut, a stock company was formed in Cartersville, Georgia, to promote Price's performances. Price's father contracted her services to the company under a one-year agreement worth $10,000 per year. During her first year on tour, Price travelled throughout the United States, appearing in Georgia, Tennessee, Kentucky, Ohio, Minnesota, Pennsylvania, Utah, Kansas, New York, Illinois, and Maryland. She travelled with her father and a succession of theatrical managers.

Later in 1884, the stock company became involved in a legal dispute with the Harris Mammoth Museum in Cincinnati, resulting in the case Harris v. Cumyns. Following the lawsuit, Price's contract was sold to Cincinnati theatrical manager R. E. J. Miles. When her contract with Miles expired in early 1885, about a year after her stage debut, Price returned to Georgia with her father and resumed touring throughout the southern United States.

=== Mattie Lee Price in Europe ===
During late 1891 and early 1892, Mattie Lee Price was in Ireland, Scotland, Wales, and England giving demonstrations. Annie Abbott (also known as Dixie Haygood) was also in Europe presenting an almost identical act. Many "magnetic" and "electric" girls were showing off their skills in innumerable locations both in Europe and the North American continent at the time.

=== Return to North America ===
Mattie Lee Price worked in various dime museums and opera houses and joined circuses during summer months. Mattie was one of the featured performers at opening of The Robinson's Musee, in Toronto, Canada in 1891. After the World's Columbian Exposition ended in 1893, she was on the same venue as Harry Houdini at the Kohl & Middleton’s South Clark Street dime museum in Chicago. Harry Houdini wrote about Mattie Lee Price and her effective marketing manager/husband, W.W. White in his books, Harry Houdini for Kids: His Life and Adventures and Miracle Mongers and Their Methods.

=== Known as Gaza ===
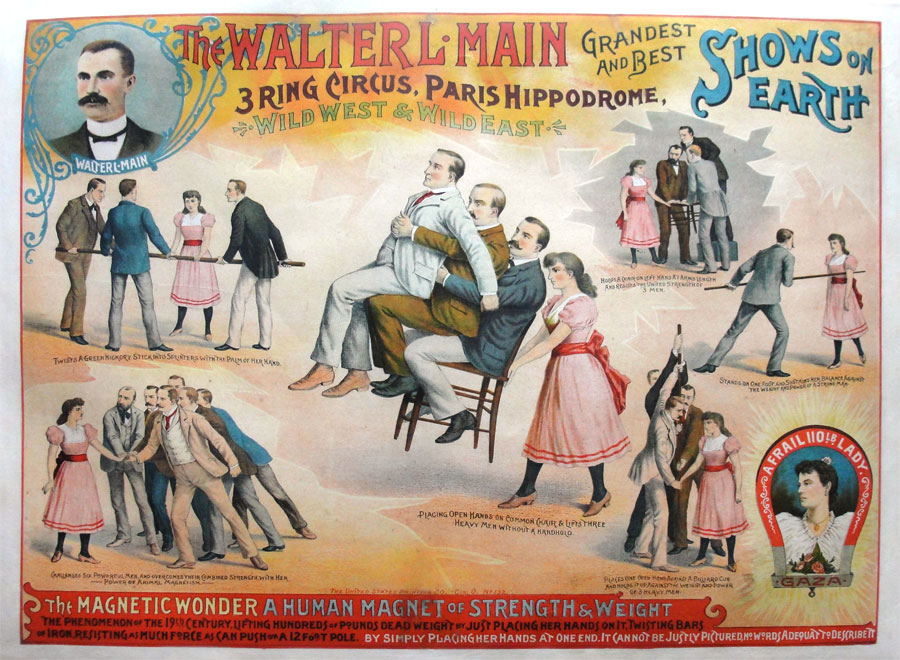
1894 "Gaza" Walter L. Main Circus Poster (From the Ken Hark Circus Collection).

In early 1894, Mattie Lee Price began using "GAZA" or "Mysterious GAZA" instead of her real name. Mr. Brigg of England challenged Mattie Lee Price's act at Frank Hall's Casino in Chicago, Illinois in January 1894. He proclaimed her act to be one of physics rather than one of magical, magnetic, or electrical power. A contest between Mr. Brigg and Mattie Lee Price was arranged where Mr. Brigg used demonstrations, drawings, and a stereopticon to convince the audience that they could use these same physical forces to better harness their horses and more efficiently pull loads.

1899 London, England: The Peerless Prodigies of Physical Phenomena and Great Presentation of Marvelous Living Human Curiosities.

Soon after the Brigg affair, Mattie was advertised with the Walter L. Main Circus in 1894 and billed as "Gaza the strong woman." She was a featured act on a lithographic poster printed to promote her. Part of the advertisement reads: "The Magnetic Wonder a Human Magnet of Strength and Weight the phenomenon of the 19th century, lifting hundreds of pounds of dead weight by just placing her hands on it, twisting bars of iron, resisting as much force as can push on a 12 foot pole by simply placing her hands at one end. It cannot be justly pictured, no words adequate to describe it."

In 1895 Mattie was with the Barnum & Bailey Circus as part of the concert. She was listed as "Mattie Lee Price, The Mysterious Gaza. The Georgia Wonder." During the summer of 1897 Mattie Lee Price was with the Great Wallace Shows (circus) out of Cincinnati, Ohio and billed as "Gaza the Magnetic Girl."

She was the youngest of the Georgia Wonders that mesmerized the public in 1884. Houdini wrote she was, "barely ninety pounds, and had the sickly look of a ‘consumptive.’" And, "yet this weakling was able to perform feats requiring super human strength and endurance from either good spirits or the devil himself."

=== In England ===
Mattie was with The Barnum & Bailey Greatest Show on Earth in London, England in 1898. She is 8th from the left on the raised stages shown on the "Peerless Prodigies of Physical Phenomena" poster from that year.

== Marriage and family ==
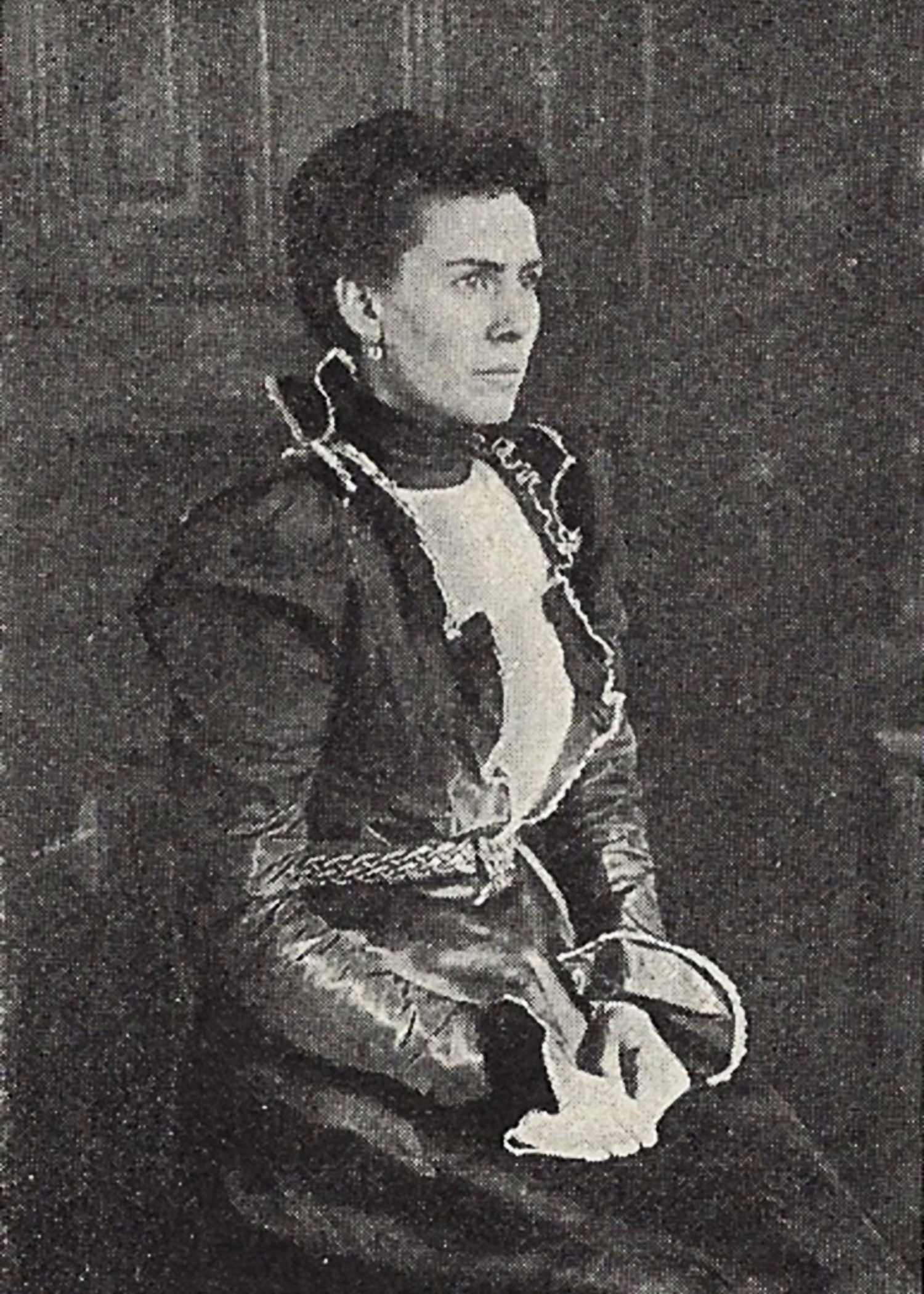
Mattie Lee Price: March 1899, London, England.

At age 16, Price married for the first of four times when she wed Samuel Wise in Madison, Florida, on November 28, 1885. About three years later, she married marketing manager William W. White at age 19 in 1888. About six years after that, she married Louis Barella at age 24 on January 10, 1894. The date of her fourth marriage, to Louis Aronson, is unknown, although she was recorded under his surname on her death certificate in 1899.

Price had two children, Charles and Jeanette. They arrived in England from New York shortly before her death at age 29 in March 1899. After Price died, the children were left orphaned and, just over a year later, were recorded as boarders on a farm in Lena, Wisconsin, in the 1900 United States census.

== Death ==
On 11 March 1899, Mattie Lee Price died at number 81 Hammersmith Road, Fulham District, London, England. She is buried in the old Fulham Burial Ground in England in an unmarked grave. Many members of the freak department attended her funeral. The funeral took place on 13 March at 2:30 p.m.
