= Febres Cordero =

Febres Cordero may refer to:

- Georgina Febres-Cordero (1861–1925), Venezuelan nun
- León Febres Cordero (1931–2008), president of Ecuador
- Miguel Febres Cordero (1854–1910), a saint in the Roman Catholic Church
