= Inclán (surname) =

Inclán is a surname. Notable people with the surname include:

- Miguel Inclán (1900–1956), Mexican actor
- Rafael Inclán (born 1941), Mexican actor
- Rafael Guas Inclán (1896–1975), Cuban politician
- Ramón Meza y Suárez Inclán (1861–1911), Cuban literary critic, historian, and professor
