= Pelayo Suárez =

Spanish footballer

Personal information
- Full name: Pelayo Suárez López
- Date of birth: 9 July 1998 (age 28)
- Place of birth: Gijón, Spain
- Height: 1.82 m (6 ft 0 in)
- Position: Centre back

Team information
- Current team: Jaén
- Number: 5

Youth career
- Xeitosa
- 2009–2017: Sporting Gijón

Senior career*
Years	Team	Apps	(Gls)
2014–2021	Sporting Gijón B	95	(1)
2020–2022	Sporting Gijón	4	(0)
2021–2022	→ Logroñés (loan)	27	(1)
2022–2023	Sabadell	11	(0)
2023–2024	Rayo Majadahonda	31	(1)
2024–2025	Pontevedra	15	(0)
2026–	Jaén	9	(0)

International career
2014	Spain U16	4	(0)
2014–2015	Spain U17	5	(0)
- * Club domestic league appearances and goals as of 7 May 2026

Pelayo Suárez López (born 9 July 1998) is a Spanish footballer who plays as a central defender for Segunda Federación club Jaén.

== Club career ==
Born in Gijón, Asturias, García joined Sporting de Gijón's Mareo in 2009, from Xeitosa CF. He made his senior debut with the reserves on 20 December 2014 at the age of just 16, coming on as a second-half substitute in a 0–1 Segunda División B away loss against SD Compostela.

Suárez was definitely promoted to the B-team in 2017, but spent most of the campaign sidelined due to a pubalgia. He renewed his contract for a further two seasons on 28 June 2019, and scored his first senior goal the following 2 February, netting the opener in a 1–3 loss at Coruxo FC.

Suárez made his first team debut on 11 October 2020, replacing Jean-Sylvain Babin in a 0–1 away loss against Real Oviedo, which was the 109th Asturian derby. The following 30 August, he moved to Primera División RFEF side SD Logroñés on a one-year loan deal.

== Personal life ==
Suárez's father Juanma and his cousin Monchu were also footballers. The former was a midfielder, while the latter was a forward; both represented Sporting in the 1990s.
