= Lulu Hurst =

American stage magician (1869–1950)

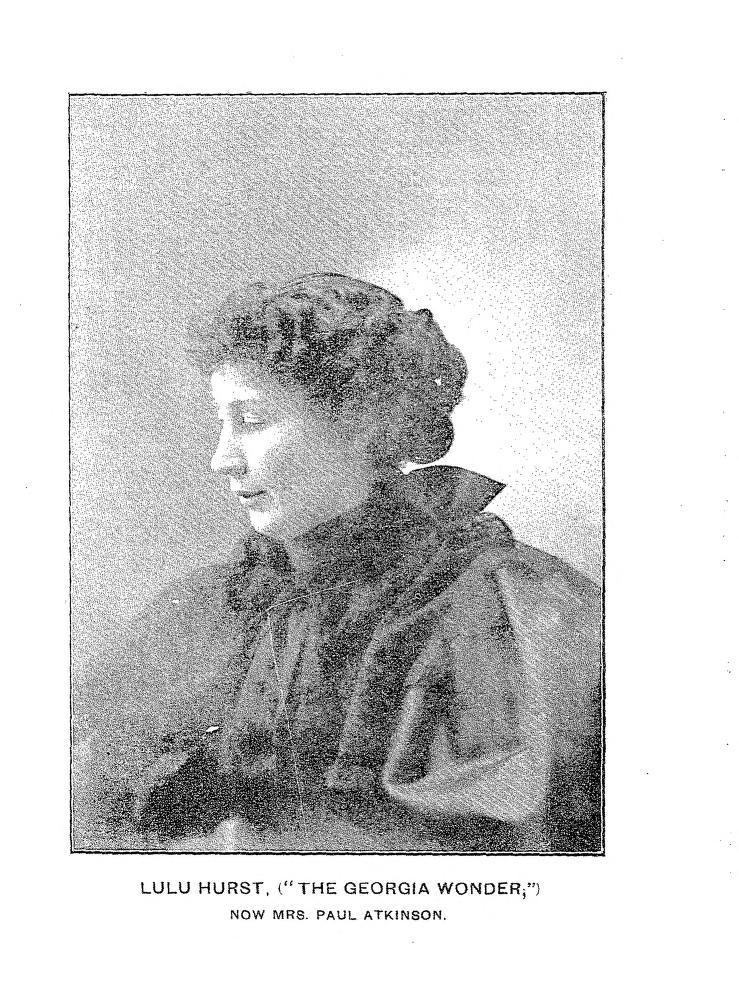
- Lulu Hurst, a photo from her autobiography.
- Born: 1869; Polk County, Georgia, U.S.
- Died: May 13, 1950 (aged 80–81)
- Occupation: Stage magician

Lula Hurst Atkinson (1869 – May 13, 1950) was an American stage magician. She was born Lula Hurst and her professional name was Lulu Hurst. Her stage names were "Wonder", "Georgia Wonder", "Electric Girl", "Magnetic Girl", and "Laughing Lulu Hurst". Her performances, such as The Heavy Weight Lifting Test, Umbrella Test, and The Balance Test, were stage tricks accomplished by force deflection. Hurst caused stage volunteers to lose balance, stumble across stages, fall into crowds and objects by placing her hands on innate objects. Hurst notably asked strong men to hold umbrellas, canes, chairs, and billiard cues while on stage.

Her name is probably the origin of the slang noun lulu, which means "extraordinary, outstanding, wonderful person, thing, or idea".

== Early life ==
Lulu Hurst was born in Polk County, Georgia in 1869 as Lula Hurst, but was more often called Lulu. Mr. W.E. Hurst, her father, enlisted in the Confederate Army of Tennessee, a divided state, when he was seventeen. He was wounded at the battle of Murfreesboro, Tennessee. Her uncle enlisted in the Union Army of Tennessee, and the two faced one another in Atlanta on July 22, 1864. Her father's company captured her uncle, and he was deported to Andersonville Prison. Once the war was over, her father returned to Athens, in East Tennessee, where he found that his house was burn down. He moved to Polk County, Georgia, where he met Hurst's mother in Cedar Valley.

Lulu Hurst was homeschooled by her mother, a Mary Sharp College alumna, until the age of ten when she moved to Cedartown to attend the public schools in Rome, Georgia. The Hurst family moved five miles outside of Cedartown to a plantation in Cedar Valley where she attended public school.

In 1885, Hurst's grandfather, Elder L.R. Hurst, prophesied that the Battle of Armageddon would occur in 1932.

== Occult Power Manifestation ==
Hurst proclaimed she obtained occult powers on September 18, 1883, at the age of fourteen, by a raging electrical storm at their plantation in Cedar Valley. Hurst heard and created a constant popping sound initially caused by the upcharge of electrical activity in the atmosphere. The Hurst family invited over twenty neighbors to listen to the sounds the following night. Many believed the noise was a mysterious force. Their house was labeled haunted, and people were afraid to approach it.

The Hurst Family received visitors from Rome, Cartersville, and Atlanta to witness her occult powers. Hurst made objects shake uncontrollably with her hands.

The Hurst Family home entertained hundreds of visitors. Her Baptist father, W.E., disliked the idea of her performing on stage. Hurst convinced W.E. to allow her to perform. In her first public exhibition, the venue reached capacity, and she earned the name "Wonder."

== Career ==
Stage Demonstrations

Chair Force Tests 

- The Heavy Weight Lifting Test
- Attempt of Two+ Men to Force Chair to the Floor While Hurst Placed Hands on Top
- Attempt to Hold Chair while Hurst Hands are on it

Billiard Cue or Cane 

- The Balance Test
- Force to Floor Across Open Palm
- Attempt to Hold Direct Object while Hurst's Hand is on it

Other Tests 

- Umbrella Test
- Weird Table Rapping or Spirit Rapping
- Attempt to Hold Direct Object while Hurst's Hand is on it

Hurst emerged in 1884 as the second electric girl. Angélique Cottin a spirit medium, performed similar stage acts in Paris in 1846. In her first public exhibition, the venue reached capacity, and she earned the title "Wonder." Hurst performed several tests, including demonstrating her ability to limit strong men's muscular energy using her hands as the opposing force. The strong men lost their balance and fell, knocking over people in the crowd. Hurst earned her name Laughling Lulu Hurst because she laughed the entire time on stage. Hurst provided the strong men with innate objects such as a cane, chair, and umbrella. The cane struggled most ending in twisted pieces. The chair began to vibrate with the pent-up force. The umbrella would gyrate and dart around the room with more force than the chair. Under the stage name the "Georgia Wonder" or "Laughing Lulu", the teenage Hurst specialised in demonstrations of great physical strength. Her act involved having some men hold an object (such as a chair or pole), and then moving the object and the men holding it with an apparently light touch.

Hurst meet her future husband and manager Paul M Atkinson during her performance in Madison, Georgia. Atkinson introduced her to audiences as the "Electric Maid".

On July 5, 1884, Hurst spent four hours in a hotel room being examined by the doctors Seth N. Jordan, George Grime, and Carlisle Terry. Hurst's examination at the age of fifteen results found she was of normal intelligence, five feet four inches, one hundred and twenty-five pounds, and of normal muscular strength. Hurst performed her Umbrellas and Chairs acts on the doctors in attendance, with the doctors finding that her occult force worked only on living muscular exertion.

In 1884, Hurst and her parents traveled to New York City to perform her stage act. Hurst broke umbrellas and walking sticks with her hands according to newspapers reports.

J.M. Laflin, champion athlete of the world - inventor of the patent parlor rowing apparatus (IA 101198569.nlm.nih.gov)

Hurst performed at the Wallack Theater in New York City. She appeared in the Telegram article following her performance in which Professor J.M. Laflin, the "Champion Athlete of the World" and the inventor of the parlor rowing apparatus appeared on stage. Hurst placed two fingers and a thumb on his hands while he attempted to lift a chair off the floor, but he was unable to get it a foot off the stage. Laflin held a billiard cue in his hands, with his muscle engaged, he began to sway, stagger, and then move violently around the stage. He fell knocking over chairs in a corner.

In 1885, Annie Abbot, known as Dixie Haygood from Milledgeville, began performing similar acts in parts of Georgia. Abbot lifted 1,000 pounds. Promoters attempted to have both performers compete on stage.

Her performances were popular in the early 1880s, drawing crowds in major cities such as Atlanta, New York, Indianapolis, and Chicago. Hurst was able to lift from a table an upside-down hat by placing her hands over the object with her force. She performed for only two years, before cancelling a planned European tour and retiring in 1885 (aged 16). Her last performance was in Knoxville, Tennessee.

Hurst left the stage at the age of eighteen. Soon after her retirement, she married her former manager. She disappeared from public life until the publication of her autobiography LULU HURST, (THE GEORGIA WONDER,) WRITES HER AUTOBIOGRAPHY, AND FOR THE FIRST TIME EXPLAINS AND DEMONSTRATES THE GREAT SECRET OF HER MARVELOUS POWER in 1897.

Hurst later admitted, in her autobiography, that her "supernatural" powers were in fact due to the judicious application of body mechanics and deflection of force, although she claimed that during her teenage years she had believed them to be genuine.

Lulu Stage Acts Explanation Image Gallery
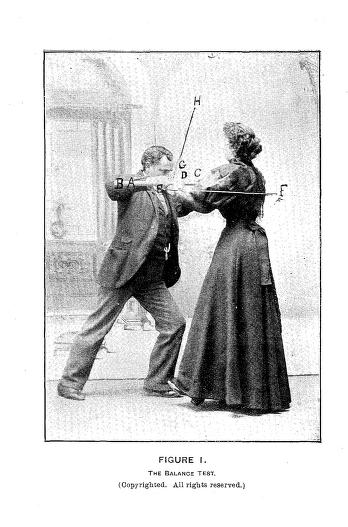
Hurst holds the cue out in front of her chest with her elbows bent with a person pushing against her.

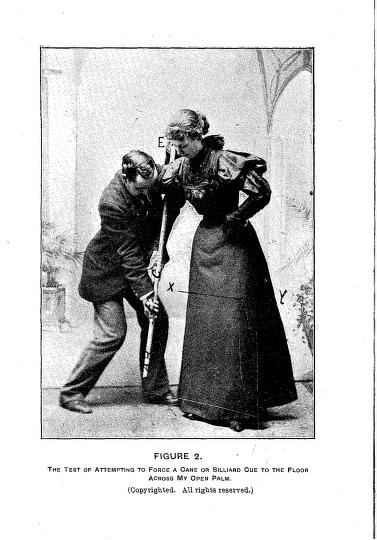
A person holds the cue or cane with their body weight and Hurst places rest an open palm against its underside between his hands.

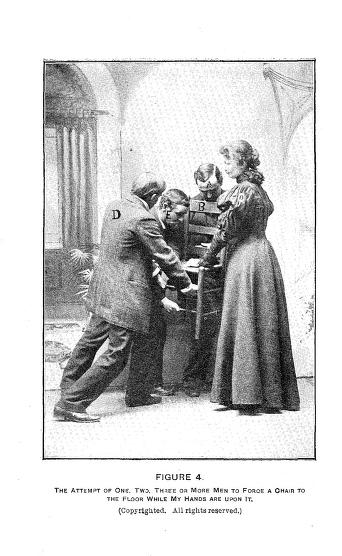
People hold a press the chair firmly downwards with intense pressure while Hurst places her hands on top of the chair.

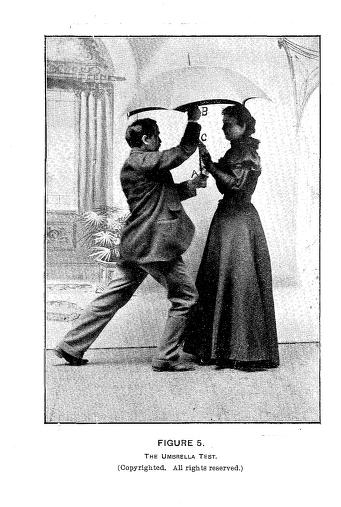
A person stands under and forcefully holds an umbrella while Hurst stands under it and places her hands on it.

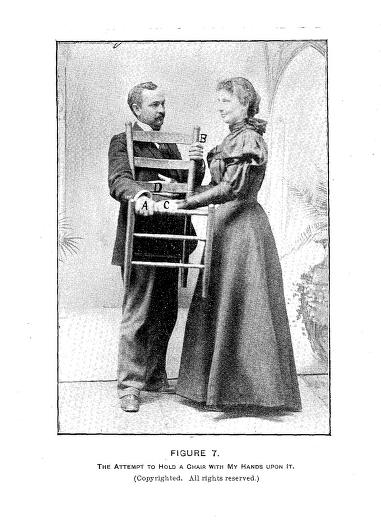
A person must stay on their feet while holding an the object after Hurst places her hands on it.

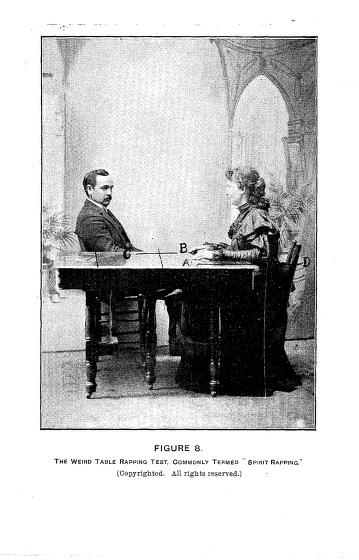
Hurst produced mysterious popping sounds in and on a table.

=== Known Performance Locations ===
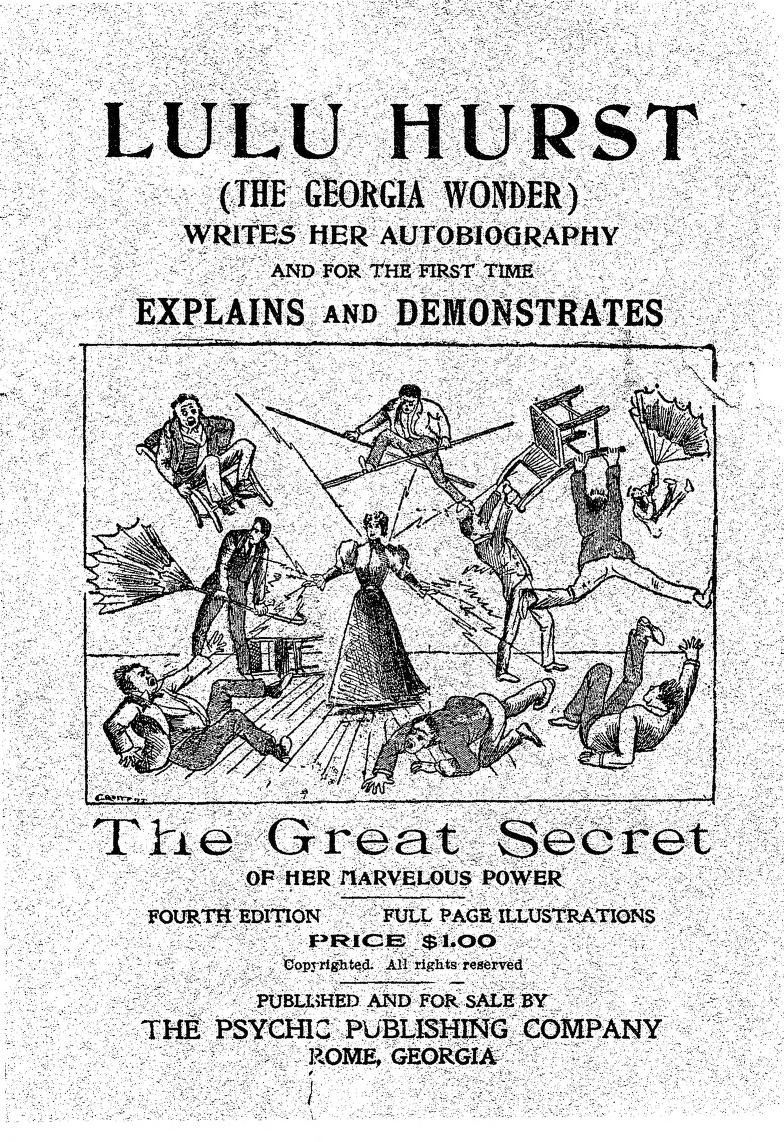
Lulu Hurst autobiography cover image

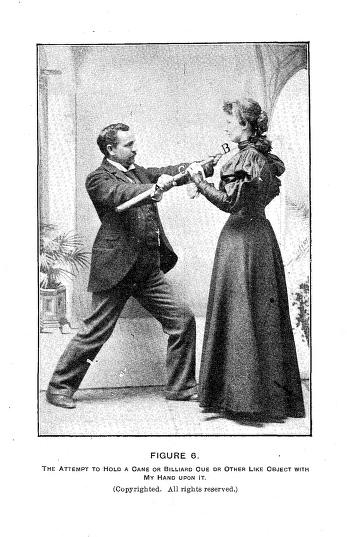
A person must stay on their feet while holding an the object after Hurst places her hands on it.

- Cedartown, Georgia
- Rome, Georgia
- Atlanta, Georgia: Two Exhibitions at DeGive's Opera House
- Chattanooga, Tennessee
- Macon, Georgia: Mercer University Private Exhibition to Faculty
- Augusta, Georgia: State Medical College Private Entertainment for Faculty and Students
- Athens, Georgia: The State University
- Madison, Georgia
- Augusta, Georgia
- Americus, Georgia
- Columbus, Georgia
- Montgomery, Alabama
- Jacksonville, Florida
- Savannah, Georgia: Pulaski House Private Exhibition
- Charleston, South Carolina: Hibernian Hall
- Charleston, South Carolina: Medical College Private Exhibition to Faculty and Students
- Columbia, South Carolina
- North Carolina
- Washington, DC: Metropolitan Hotel
- Washington, DC: Volta Laboratory Private Exhibition & Examination
- Baltimore, Maryland: Ford Theater
- Hagerstown, Maryland
- Columbia, Maryland
- Patterson, Maryland
- Trenton, Maryland
- New York City, New York: Wallack Theater
- New York City: Madison Square Theatre
- Boston, Massachusetts: Globe Theater
- Providence, Rhode Island
- Troy, New York
- Albany, New York
- Fall River, Massachusetts
- Saratoga Springs, New York: "The Casino" Skating Rink
- Newport, Rhode Island
- Long Branch, New Jersey
- Brooklyn, New York: Brooklyn Theater
- Long Branch, New Jersey: Mr. W. Leland Private Cottage
- Buffalo, New York: Central Music Hall
- San Francisco, California: Metropolitan Hall
- Sacramento, California: State Fair
- Oakland, California
- Butte City, California
- Helena, Montana
- Anaconda, Montana
- Deer Lodge, Montana
- Salt Lake City, Utah
- Denver, Colorado
- Knoxville, Tennessee

== Death ==
As Lula Hurst Atkinson, she died in 1950. On her gravestone was her name, Lula. Her husband, Paul, died in 1931. Hurst, Paul, and their children are buried in Madison Cemetery in Georgia.

== Controversy ==
Nelson W. Perry proclaimed in 1891 in the Telegraphic Journal and Electrical Review that Hurst waited for the stronger person to exert themselves and unexpectedly changed direction to cause the opposing person to become off balance.

The magician Harry Houdini thought Hurst hid her ability to perform the lever and fulcrum method expertly enough that she could fool audiences into believing she had a supernatural power.

Popular Mechanics claimed she exercised the "pivot-and-fulcrum theorem of physics."

Joe Nickell investigated Hurst and found her use of force deflection was a common use of "physical principles and tricks." Nickell believed she embraced herself as a powerful medium.

== Publication ==
Lulu Hurst (the Georgia Wonder) Writes Her Autobiography, and for the First Time Explains and Demonstrates the Great Secret of Her Marvelous Power (1897)

== In Fiction ==
The Magnetic Girl: A Novel (2019) by Jessica Handler.

== See also ==
- Dixie Haygood
- Mattie Lee Price
