= Juanma (footballer, born 1966) =

Spanish footballer

Personal information
- Full name: Juan Manuel Suárez del Valle
- Date of birth: 4 March 1966 (age 60)
- Place of birth: Luanco, Spain
- Height: 1.95 m (6 ft 5 in)
- Position: Midfielder

Senior career*
Years	Team	Apps	(Gls)
1982–1983	Ensidesa		
1983–1986	Real Avilés		
1986–1987	Sporting Gijón B		
1987–1992	Sporting Gijón	116	(9)
1992–1995	Logroñés	52	(3)
1995–1997	Granada	48	(6)
1997–1999	Real Avilés	24	(2)
- * Club domestic league appearances and goals

Juan Manuel Suárez del Valle (born 4 March 1966) is a former Spanish footballer who played as a midfielder.

== Career ==
Juanma started his career at the age of 16, making his debut for Ensidesa on 4 April 1981 in a 6–2 loss against San Sebastián, Real Sociedad's B team. In 1983, Juanma joined Real Avilés, following Avilés' and Ensidesa's merger. In 1986, Juanma signed for Sporting Gijón, initially playing for the club's B team. On 17 May 1987, Juanma made his La Liga debut for Sporting, in a 1–1 draw against Mallorca. Juanma stayed with Sporting for six seasons, scoring one hat-trick in a 4–1 win against Celta Vigo on 27 April 1988, a match he also received a red card in. In 1992, after 9 league goals in 116 league appearances for Sporting, Juanma signed for Logroñés. Juanma spent three seasons at Logroñés, making 48 La Liga appearances, scoring three times. In 1995, Juanma signed for Segunda División B club Granada. Juanma stayed at Granada for two seasons, before re-signing for Real Avilés in 1997, before retiring in 1999.

== Personal life ==
Juanma's son, Pelayo Suárez, is currently a defender for Sporting Gijón. Juanma played alongside his brother, Monchu, at Sporting.
