= Myra Belle Martin =

American teacher, writer, and financier (1861–1936)

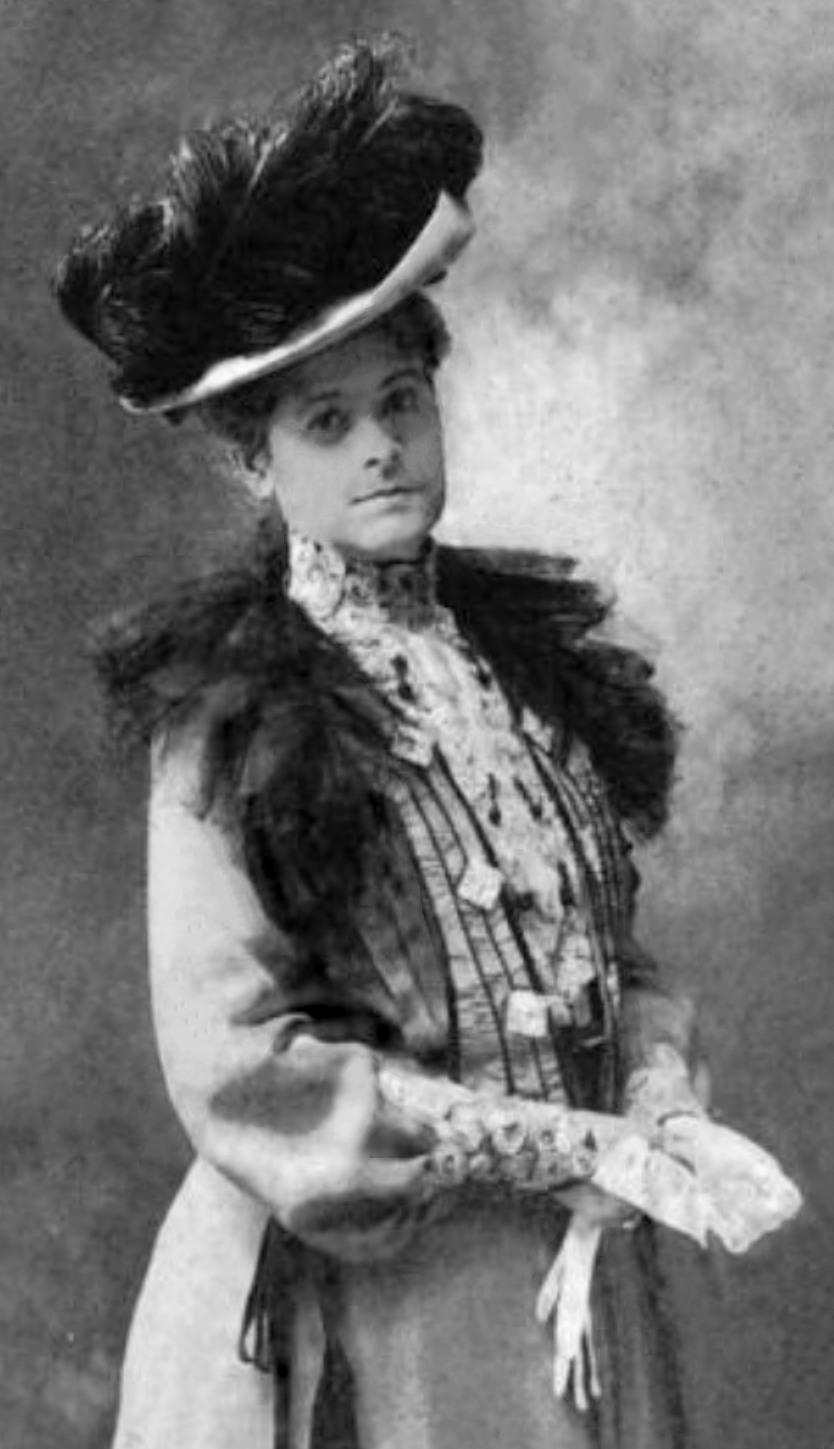
- Martin in 1902
- Born: October 6, 1861; Grafton, New Hampshire, U.S.
- Died: December 2, 1936 (aged 75)
- Occupations: Teacher, writer, financier
- Writing career
- Language: English
- Notable work: Art education in American life

Signature
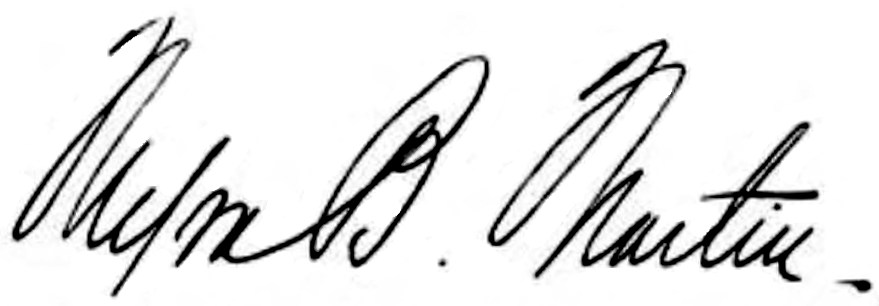

Myra Belle Martin (October 6, 1861 – December 2, 1936) was an American teacher, writer, and financier. Having taught one year in Pennsylvania, six years in Connecticut, and one year in Massachusetts, she was the first woman elected president of the Eastern Connecticut Teachers' Association. She retired from teaching in 1889 and became associate manager of the New York City office of Prang Educational Company, 1889–93. After this time, she held various positions for several important corporations, including secretary and treasurer of the San Luis Mining Company; secretary of the George A. Treadweil Mining Company; as well as secretary and director of the Copete Consolidated Copper Company, and Fahnestock Electric Company.

Martin was a prominent member of the American Ethnological Society, the American Anthropological Society, the American Scenic and Historic Preservation Society, the National Institute of Civics, the National Society of Craftsmen, the National Arts Club, the Nineteenth Century Club, the Drawing Room Club, the Shakespeare Club, and the Dickens Fellowship. She was a member of the New York City Chapter of the Daughters of the American Revolution, of which she was for seven years the corresponding secretary; treasurer of the Guild for Crippled Children of the Poor of New York City; member of the Library Committee of the New York School of Applied Design for Women; and a founder of the Patria Club of New York.

== Early years and education ==
Myra Belle Martin was born October 6, 1861, in Grafton, New Hampshire. She was the daughter of Isaac Bullock Martin and Almira Helen Haskins Martin. On her mother's side, she was descended from William Haskins —the name was sometimes spelled Hoskins— who was one of the earliest settlers to come from England after the Mayflower. He was a freeman at Scituate, Massachusetts, in 1634, and was one of the thirty who bought Bristol County, Massachusetts, from the Native Americans. Several of his descendants fought in the American Revolutionary War, some as officers and some as privates. Her father was also descended from an old New England family, and on his side she had several ancestors who fought in the Revolution.

Having been educated in the public schools of Boston and Southbridge, Massachusetts, she prepared to enter the sophomore class at Wellesley College.

== Career ==
=== Teacher ===
In 1881, she began teaching, and subsequently prepared many students in Latin, Greek and mathematics, for Smith, Vassar, Wellesley, Harvard, Yale, the Sheffield Scientific school and the Massachusetts Institute of Technology. She taught one year in Oil City, Pennsylvania, six years in Willimantic, Connecticut, and one year in Winchester, Massachusetts. She was the first woman elected President of the Eastern Connecticut Teachers' Association. In 1889, she accepted the superintendency of the art department of the Prang Educational Company of Boston, Chicago, and New York City, in the last of which cities she resided.

=== Business ===
In 1893, she changed careers, and became engaged as Secretary in several important corporations. Among them are three —the Greene Consolidated Copper Company, the San Luis Mining Company, and the George A. Treadwell Mining Company— whose successes were largely due to her work.

As Secretary of the Greene Consolidated Copper Company, she personally issued 150,000 shares of its capital stock, which were countersigned by two prominent trust companies, and she also handled about US$1,250,000 of the money received for such stock and turned over her accounts to her successor with only two errors —- both trifling. At this time, this was believed to be a record for accuracy unsurpassed by anyone in a similar position. Her work in connection with these corporations brought her into business relations with eminent financiers, whose implicit confidence she retained.

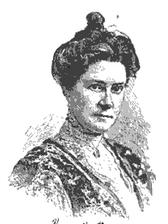
Myra Belle Martin (1910)

In 1902, she registered as a law student at New York, with the view of entering the profession among whose prominent members she had a wide acquaintance. By 1915, she held several prominent positions, including A. A. C. Holding Corporation, Secretary, Treasurer, Director; Brookshire Mining Co., Secretary, Treasurer, Director; Cardenena Mining Co., Secretary, Treasurer, Director; Copete Consolidated Copper Co., Secretary, Treasurer, Director; Copete Mining Co., Secretary, Treasurer, Director; Fahnestock Electric Co., Secretary, Treasurer, Director; Lucia Mining Co., Secretary, Treasurer, Director; and Meiczer Mining Co., Secretary, Treasurer, Director. Her connection with these corporations enabled her to amass a modest fortune.

=== Affiliations ===
Martin became a prominent member of the Society of the Daughters of the American Revolution, and for many years, served as Corresponding Secretary of the New York City Chapter, of which Emily Nelson Ritchie McLean was Regent. She was one of the founders of the Patria Club and was a prominent member of the Ethnological Society and of the National Arts Club. She was a member of the Board of Managers of the Guild for Crippled Children, and also served as president of the Shakespeare Club of New York.

== Selected works ==
- Art education in American life, 1892
- The business woman visits Yaqui, 1894
- Account of the secretary's visit to the properties of the San Luis Mining Company, 1904
- Walter S. Logan : sketch of the life of the late president of the American Scenic and Historic Preservation Society, 1907
- Shakespeare, Writer of Letters, 1929

== Death ==
Martin died on December 2, 1936, at the age of 75.
