= Mabelle Biggart =

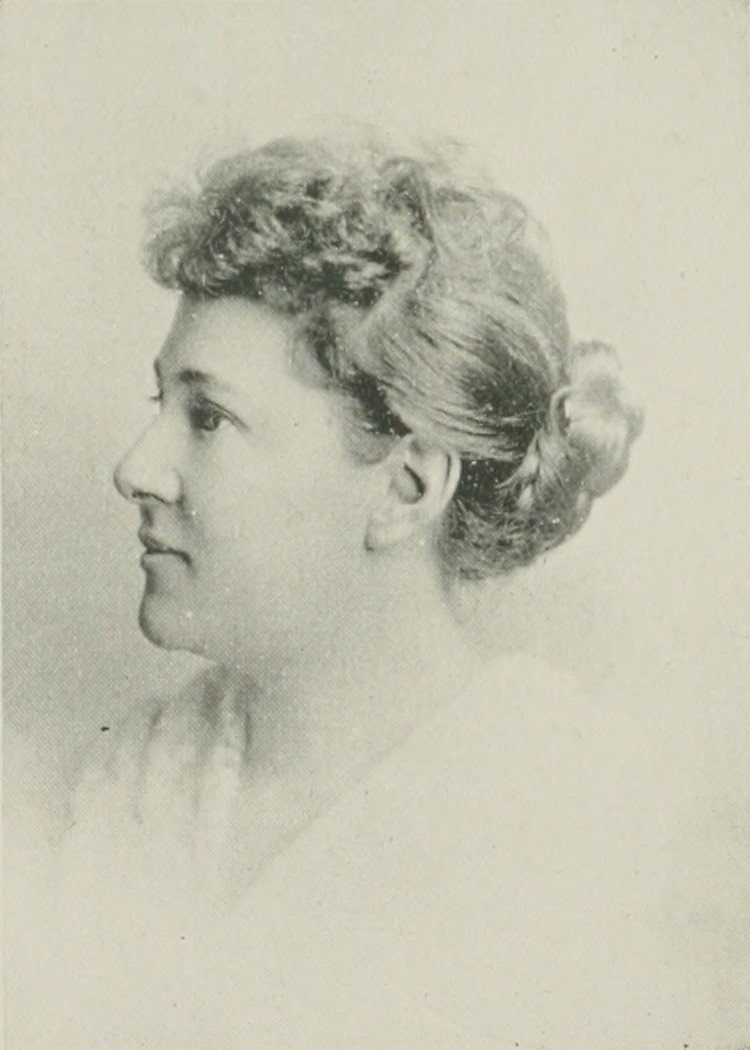
- Photo in A Woman of the Century
- Born: Mabelle Biggart; February 22, 1861; New York City, U.S.
- Died: Unknown
- Education: State Normal School, Fredonia, New York
- Occupations: educator; dramatic reader; preacher; writer

Mabelle Biggart (February 22, 1861 – ?) was an American educator, dramatic reader, preacher, and writer. She was instrumental in starting the Polytechnic Institute and Woman's Athletic Club of Denver, intended to help women to gain health, strength, and beauty. She gave exercises illustrating the Delsarte System, and took part in a number of Chautauqua engagements. Biggart was in charge of a "Polytechnic Department" in the Denver NewsLetter, devoting the space to physical culture, science, and literature. She also wrote articles for various other publications.

== Early life and education ==
Mabelle Biggart was born in New York City, February 22, 1861. She was of Scottish and English ancestry, descending from a long line of teachers, authors, and collegians. Her great-grandmother on her father's side was named Porter, and was a sister of Commodore Porter, of American Revolutionary War time, and a cousin of Jane Porter, the author of "Scottish Chiefs." Her great-grandfather married into the clan of McKies. Thomas Carlyle and Jane Welsh Carlyle were closely related. Her grandfather on her mother's side was Sir Richard Bond, of London, England. Her father was born in Glasgow, Scotland, and her mother was a native of New York City. Her parents died when she was only a child.

Biggart took a preparatory college course in the State Normal School in Fredonia, New York, and an oratorical and literary course in Philadelphia. Her professional education was mainly in Philadelphia and New York, though she was a constant student of dramatic elocution and of languages.

== Career ==
Biggart had an intense, highly strung nature, and was not robust. Her close application to her profession and her studies more than once forced her to rest. She held several important positions in colleges and seminaries, and for five years, she had charge of rhetoric and elocution in the West High School, Cleveland, Ohio. A bronchial trouble sent her to Denver, Colorado, where she was instrumental in building up an institution called the Woman's Polytechnic Institute. She gave part of each week to that work, and the remainder was employed in the State College in Fort Collins, Colorado, 72 miles (116 km) from Denver.

In 1890, she was in charge of the department of elocution at the Chautauqua assembly of Glen Park, Palmer Lake, Colorado. During the summer of 1891, she took part in a number of Chautauqua engagements. For about two years, the Colorado climate proved beneficial to her, but eventually, the high altitude caused extreme nervous troubles and necessitated another change. She entered upon a new line of dramatized readings from her own interpretations of French, German and English masterpieces. A tour of the United States was undertaken, accompanied by her friend, Miss Marie Louise Gumaer, contralto.

Biggart's literary productions were numerous, including a volume of miscellaneous poems and "Songs from the Rockies," short stories and sketches of western life, a book on "Educational Men and Women and Educational Institutions of the West," "Sketches of Popular Living American Authors," a series of "Supplementary Reading Leaflets", and a work of fiction. Some of her poems were set to music.

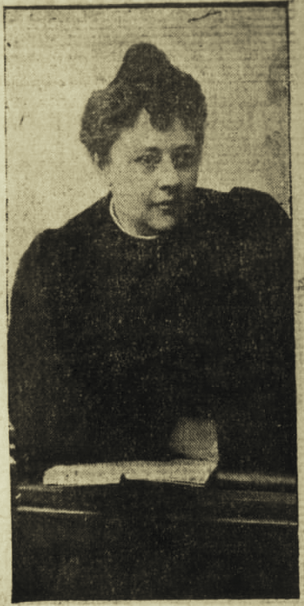
1905

In 1905, while resting in Atlantic City, New Jersey, she gave addresses in the Presbyterian and Methodist churches in order to arouse interest in the Hopis and Navajos. She also gave several gospel addresses in pulpits and the YMCA, preaching twice on "Condensed Interpretation and Dramatization" of George Eliot's "Adam Bede".

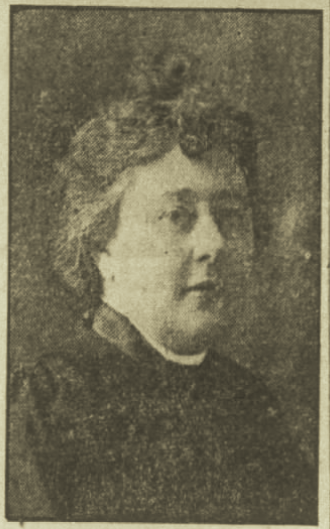
1910

By 1906, she was holding Gospel services in some of the leading Protestant churches in New York, Pennsylvania, and New Jersey. Furthering the "aggressive evangelism" work of R. W. MacCullough, she became the assistant pastor at the Union Baptist Church, of Noble Street, Greenpoint, Brooklyn. She had previously traveled a lot in the U.S. and abroad, lecturing, preaching and doing evangelistic work – mostly through the American Methodists in Norway, Denmark, Germany— and other European countries, through other denominations, Wesleyans, Presbyterians, Congregationalists and any other denomination to which she was invited. After her return to the U.S., she spent some time among the Navajo and Hopi, studying them and their needs, and carrying the message where she could.

== Selected works ==
- "A Woman that is a Woman"
- "List to the Voice!"
- "Newfoundland"
- "Where is the New Woman?"
- "Dr. Grenfell's Labrador Mission"
- "On the Painted Desert"
