= Dixie Haygood =

American stage magician

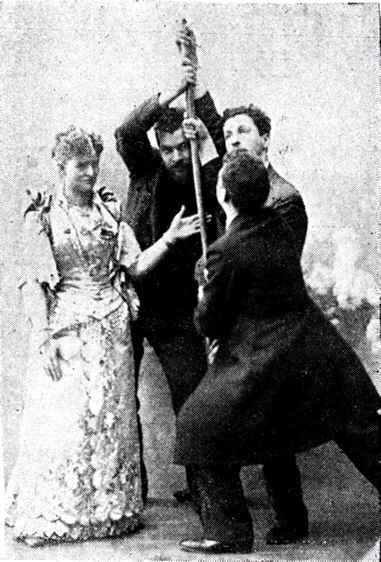
- Dixie Haygood (left) performing a trick in which three men appear to be trying to force a billiards cue to the floor while she prevents them from succeeding
- Born: Dixie Annie Jarratt; 1861; Milledgeville, Georgia, Confederate States
- Died: November 21, 1915 (aged 53–54); Macon, Georgia, United States
- Occupation: Stage magician

Dixie Annie Haygood (née Jarratt; 1861 – November 21, 1915) a.k.a. Annie Abbott, from Milledgeville, Georgia was an American stage magician.

== Early life ==
Dixie Annie Jarratt was born in Georgia, one of 10 children of James Archelaus Jarratt and Eleanor Harriett Clopton. Although her parents were from Kentucky and Alabama, they lived most of their lives in Milledgeville, Georgia. Dixie married Charles N. Hagood [sic], in Baldwin, Georgia, on 28 April 1878.

She was widowed when Hagood died, on 17 September 1885.

== Career ==
After witnessing Lulu Hurst performing as the "Georgia Wonder" in 1884, Dixie Haygood developed her own version of the "human magnet" act, under the stage name "Annie Abbott", the Georgia Magnet. Her act, like Hurst's, involved her displacing objects held securely by one or more strong men, and was also a huge success. Because Haygood was a small, slender woman (as opposed to Hurst who even at fifteen was large and physically imposing), her performances were regarded as even more miraculous. She was particularly noted for the "lift test", in which she easily resisted the efforts of several large men to lift her 100-pound (43.4-kg) frame from the ground. In 1886, her husband, whom she married when she was 17 years old, Charles N. Haygood, a deputy marshal, was shot and killed during an argument, leaving her the sole earner for their three children.

Haygood was an inventive self-promoter, going so far as to claim that her "powers" caused her terrible headaches and advertising in newspapers for a cure. Despite numerous media outlets reporting on the physical tricks that made her act possible (especially the "lift test"), her popularity was undiminished. She herself never commented on the source of her abilities.

In the 1890s Haygood was invited to perform in London, and her successful six-week run there led to a two-year European tour. During this period she performed for numerous heads of state, including Kaiser Wilhelm II of the German Empire, Emperor Franz Josef I of Austria-Hungary, and Tsar Alexander III of the Russian Empire.

Haygood died in Macon, Georgia on November 21, 1915, and was interred in Memory Hill Cemetery, Milledgeville, Georgia.

By some estimates, Haygood had a more impressive career than her inspiration, Lulu Hurst, partly because Hurst retired from stage work at a young age. Haygood was so successful that other women occasionally performed under her stage name, Annie Abbott, without permission.

== Methods ==
Unlike Lulu Hurst, Haygood did not reveal her methods, however, professional magicians have described her methods in detail. The magician John Fisher wrote that her ability had nothing to do with a secret power or strength, she had a "sound knowledge of unrecognised principles of leverage, inertia, and the deflection of forces." Fisher revealed how such feats could be performed in his book Body Magic (1980).

According to magic historian Walter B. Gibson "There was no "Great Unknown," or invisible force which aided either Lulu Hurst or Annie Abbott, although many believers in the supernatural felt sure there was. The whole exhibition depended upon force deflection, which is often seen in our ordinary actions, but which generally passes unnoticed."

Investigator Joe Nickell said that Abbott was "a brief sensation in London" but exposed by what Houdini called a 'a keen-witted reporter'" Houdini also claimed that of all of Hurst's imitators, Abbott was '[O]ne of the cleverest of these'". Nickell visited her grave in Memory Hill Cemetery, located in Milledgeville, Georgia.
