= Georgina Febres-Cordero =

Venezuelan nun

Servant of God Georgina Febres-Cordero OP
- Born: Georgina Josefa Febres-Cordero Troconis; 16 November 1861; Mérida, Venezuela
- Died: 28 June 1925 (aged 63); Mérida, Venezuela

Georgina Febres-Cordero (in full Georgina Josefa del Carmen Febres Cordero-Troconis), also known as "Mother Georgina" (16 November 1861 – 28 June 1925) was a Venezuelan religious sister.

== Life ==
After the death of her mother in October 1873, Georgina took charge of the Clarisas Sisters congregation along with her aunt Sofía Febres Cordero, sister of her father. Back then, they were the only religious congregation in Mérida. After the execution of the Extinction of the Convents of Female Religious Life Decree on 5 May 1874, during the presidency of Antonio Guzmán Blanco, the congregation of the Clarisas Sisters were ordered to close and their members to return to their homes.

She founded the Dominican Sisters of Santa Rosa de Lima on 5 July 1900, and was the director and administrator of the Hospicio San Juan de Dios accompanied by Julia Picón and Herminia Vitoria under the protection of bishop Antonio Ramón Silva.

Eighty years after her death, on 28 June 2005, Febres Cordero's beatification process started in Mérida.

== See also ==
- Catholic Church in Venezuela
