= Ramón Meza y Suárez Inclán =

Cuban politician and historian

- Born: January 28, 1861; Havana, Captaincy General of Cuba, Spanish Empire
- Died: 1911 (aged 49–50); Havana, Cuba

Ramón Meza y Suárez Inclán (January 28, 1861 – 1911), was a Cuban literary critic, historian, professor and Doctor in Philosophy and Literature at the University of Havana, and also author of many works of both fiction and non-fiction.

== Life ==
When he was 17 years of age, he enrolled in the University of Havana, where he majored in 1882 in Civil Law.

Two years later, his first literary reviews were published. He contributed extensively to the periodicals La lotería, to Revista de Cuba, and Cuba en América.

On July 7, 1900, he was appointed Subsecretary of Justice, filling in the position for Alfredo Zayas y Alfonso.

A month later, on August 17, 1900, he resigned from the position to which he had been appointed, and was replaced by Gastón Mora y Varona.

In 1900, he wrote an article for the faculty at the University of Havana titled Don Quijote como tipo ideal (English: Don Quixote as the ideal kind), in which he paid tribute to Cervante's masterpiece Don Quijote de la Mancha.

== Published works ==
- Meza y Súarez Inclán, Ramón (1907). Homero: la Iliada y la Odisea. pp. 51.
- Meza y Suárez Inclán, Ramón (1887). Carmela. Propaganda literature. pp. 205.
- Meza y Suárez Inclán, Ramón (1889). D. Aniceto el tendero. Imprenta de L. Tasso. p. 186.
- Meza y Suárez Inclán, Ramón (1887). Mi tío el empleado. L. Tasso Serra.
- Meza y Suárez Inclán, Ramón (1993). Mi tío el empleado. Ediciones de Cultura Hispánica. p. 405. ISBN 978-84-7232-680-4.
- Meza y Suárez Inclán, Ramón (1908). Eusebio Guiteras. Impr. Avisador commercial. pp. 29.
- Meza y Suárez Inclán, Ramón (1891). Últimas páginas. Establecimiento tipográfico El Pilar, de Manuel de Armas. p. 184.
- Meza y Suárez Inclán (1908). Eusebio Guiteras. Impr. Avisador Comercial. pp. 29.
- Meza y Suárez Inclán, Ramón (1911). Los González del Valle: estudio biográfico. p. 76.
- Ramón Meza y Suárez Inclán (1891). Una sesión de hipnotismo: Comedia en dos actos. p. 61.
- Ramón Meza y Suárez Inclán (1894). Estudio histórico-crítico de La Iliada y La Odisea y su influencia en los demás géneros poéticos de Grecia. Impr. "La Universal". p. 112.
- Meza y Suárez Inclán, Ramón (2010). Estudio Historico Critico de la Iliada Y la Odisea Y Su Influencia en Los Demas Generos Poeticos de Grecia. Kessinger Publishing, LLC. p. 118.

== Other materials to consult ==
- González Freixas, Manuel A. (1985). Sociedad y tipos en las novelas de Ramón Meza Suárez y Inclán. Ediciones Universal.
