= Rurouni Kenshin (film) =

2012 Japanese film

- Theatrical release poster

Japanese name
- Kanji: るろうに剣心
Transcriptions
- Revised Hepburn: Rurōni Kenshin
- Directed by: Keishi Ōtomo
- Screenplay by: Kiyomi Fujii; Keishi Ōtomo
- Based on: Rurouni Kenshin by Nobuhiro Watsuki
- Produced by: Osamu Kubota
- Starring: Takeru Satoh; Emi Takei; Kōji Kikkawa; Yū Aoi; Munetaka Aoki; Gō Ayano; Eiji Okuda; Yōsuke Eguchi; Teruyuki Kagawa
- Cinematography: Takuro Ishizaka
- Edited by: Tsuyoshi Imai
- Music by: Naoki Satō
- Production companies: Warner Bros. Pictures Japan; Amuse; Shueisha; KDDI; C&I Entertainment; Yahoo! Japan; IMJ Entertainment; RoC Works Co.; Studio Swan
- Distributed by: Warner Bros. Pictures
- Release date: August 25, 2012 (Japan)
- Running time: 134 minutes
- Country: Japan
- Language: Japanese
- Budget: $10 million
- Box office: $37.3 million

Rurouni Kenshin (Japanese: るろうに剣心, Hepburn: Rurōni Kenshin), also known as Rurouni Kenshin Part I: Origins in North America, is a 2012 Japanese jidaigeki action film based on the manga of the same name written and illustrated by Nobuhiro Watsuki. Directed by Keishi Ōtomo, the film stars Takeru Satoh and Emi Takei. It focuses on fictional events that take place during the early Meiji era in Japan, telling the story of a countryside wanderer named Himura Kenshin, a former assassin who now offers aid to those in need as atonement for the murders he once committed, as he helps a dojo owner and protects a woman from a ruthless drug lord.

Rumors circulated of a live-action adaptation of the manga before it was announced. The Sankei Sports newspaper reported that the staff aimed to release the film internationally and eventually make a series. This was the first live-action adaptation of the manga. During the production, Watsuki offered his ideas for the movie, which were used in the film.

Rurouni Kenshin was theatrically released by Warner Bros. Pictures Japan on August 25, 2012, in Japan, grossing over $36 million domestically and over $60 million worldwide as of November 2012. The film was licensed for distribution in over 60 countries in Europe, Latin America and Asia. The movie premiered in North America as an opening selection for the 2012 LA EigaFest on December 14, 2012.

== Plot ==
As the Imperialist forces celebrate their victory in the Battle of Toba–Fushimi, a participant known as the Hitokiri Battōsai walks away from the battlefield, abandoning his sword. It is claimed by one of the fallen, Udō Jin-e.

A decade later, Saitō Hajime and his fellow policemen investigate the murder of an undercover cop supposedly by the Battōsai. But Saitō is not convinced and suspects Takeda Kanryū, a wealthy, but cruel businessman. Meanwhile, the former Battōsai (now calling himself Himura Kenshin) arrives in Tokyo. While roaming, he meets Kamiya Kaoru, the owner of her late father's Kendo school. With her dojo's name smeared by one bearing the name of Battōsai, she attacks him believing him to be the famed killer, but is proven wrong when Kenshin reveals he only carries a "reverse-blade sword" (逆刃刀, sakabatō).

Elsewhere, Takani Megumi, a woman forced to make opium for Takeda Kanryū, escapes and turns to the police for protection after witnessing the deaths of the other opium makers. However, Udō Jin-e, under the service of Kanryū, hunts her down, slaying everyone in the police station. Luckily, she escapes in the ensuing chaos.

Kaoru crosses paths with Jin-e, the actual perpetrator killing under her dojo's style of swordsmanship. No match for him, she is injured in the fight, but Kenshin appears out of nowhere and saves her. Jin-e immediately realizes Kenshin's hidden identity as the true Battōsai, before a swarm of policemen rush onto the scene, giving Kenshin and Kaoru a chance to flee. Kaoru leads Kenshin to her dojo where they will be safe. Later, a group of thugs under Takeda Kanryū attempt to take over the dojo. Kenshin beats down the entire gang without killing a single one before the police arrive. Kenshin takes the blame for the incident and gets himself arrested in order to protect Kaoru's dojo. Saitō recognizes him and they briefly fight, with Kenshin refusing to help the police because he has vowed not to kill again. After his release, he is greeted by Kaoru who knows Kenshin is not the Battōsai who had defamed her dojo and takes him back to the dojo. Kenshin afterward moves in with Kaoru and her only student, the boy Myōjin Yahiko.

Still running on the streets for her life, Megumi runs into Yahiko who helps hide her and brings her to the dojo where she is introduced to everyone. Kaoru treats everyone to a sukiyaki dinner at the Akabeko restaurant, only to have the occasion spoiled by Kanryū coming and offering to hire Kenshin, who humbly declines. Here, he is challenged by Sagara Sanosuke for the job and they leave the establishment to fight.

Later that evening, Jin-e goes on a killing spree leaving many corpses for the police to find the following day. Kenshin witnesses the horror, as well as a woman mourning the death of her lover. This evokes a memory for Kenshin from his years as an assassin when he witnessed a woman mourning a man that he had killed, the fight that left a scar on his face. Later that night, a masked man working for Kanryū warns Megumi of coming dangers.

The next day the people around the dojo fall ill from rat poison contaminating the community wells. Megumi suspects it is Kanryū's doing and uses her medical training to help the victims. Angry at Kanryū, Megumi attempts to kill him, but fails and is instead held hostage. Besting all his men, Kenshin and Sanosuke attack Kanryū's mansion. Saitō assists them to subdue Kanryū, who is armed with a Gatling gun. They rescue Megumi, but discover that Jin-e, the fake Battōsai and Kanryū's man, has kidnapped Kaoru.

Kenshin pursues Jin-e. To further provoke Kenshin, Jin-e uses a special technique that paralyzes Kaoru's lungs, which can only be stopped by killing him. After an intense battle, Kenshin critically injures Jin-e by shattering his elbow with his scabbard. Before Kenshin could land the killing blow, Kaoru overcomes the paralysis and stops Kenshin from killing Jin-e. Jin-e commits suicide, telling Kenshin that he who lives by the sword must die by the sword, counter to Kenshin's vow never to kill again.

Kenshin, tired and wounded, carries the unconscious Kaoru back to the dojo. Upon waking up, Kaoru does not see Kenshin and goes in search for him. She finds him carrying back some vegetables and is relieved that he decided to stay.

== Cast ==
Principal cast list:

- Takeru Satoh as Himura Kenshin, a former assassin turned wanderer who has made a vow never to kill again.
- Emi Takei as Kamiya Kaoru, the owner of a Kendo school left to her by her father.
- Munetaka Aoki as Sagara Sanosuke, a street fighter who befriends Kenshin.
- Yū Aoi as Takani Megumi, one of Kanryū's forced opium-makers, though from a famed family of doctors and healers.
- Taketo Tanaka as Myojin Yahiko, a young boy and Kaoru's only student at the dojo.
- Yōsuke Eguchi as Saitō Hajime, a former member of the Shinsengumi who now works for the Meiji government as a police officer under the name of Fujita Gorō.
- Kōji Kikkawa as Udō Jin-e, one of Kanryū's men, and a survivor of the Battle of Toba-Fushimi.
- Gō Ayano as Gein, another of Kanryū's men.
- Genki Sudo as Inui Banjin, another of Kanryū's men.
- Teruyuki Kagawa as Takeda Kanryū, a ruthless businessman.
- Masataka Kubota as Kiyosato Akira
- Eiji Okuda as Yamagata Aritomo
- Kaoru Hirata - Sekihara Tae
- Mei Nagano - Sanjō Tsubame
- Ichirōta Miyagawa as Katsura Kogorō

== Production ==
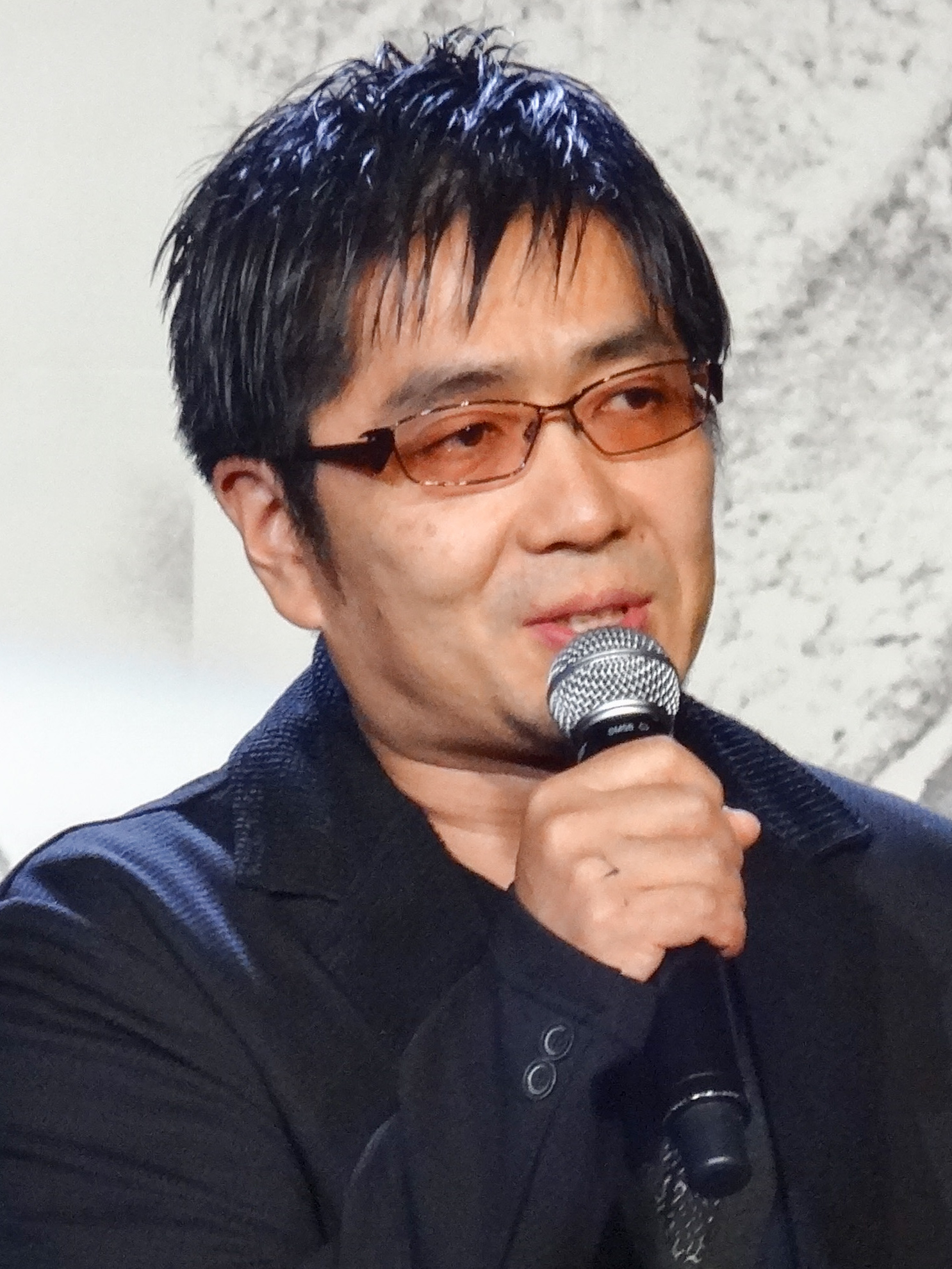
Director Keishi Ōtomo

On June 28, 2011, a live-action film adaptation of Rurouni Kenshin was announced. Produced by Warner Bros. Pictures Japan, with actual film production done by Studio Swan, the film was directed by Keishi Ōtomo and stars Takeru Satoh as Kenshin, Munetaka Aoki as Sanosuke Sagara and Emi Takei as Kaoru. Ōtomo said he aimed to make the live-action more complex than the original manga version. During an interview, Satoh said Rurouni Kenshin was one of the first manga he read to the point he would play sword-fights with his friends. Additionally, once he was cast as Kenshin, Satoh started intense swordsmanship training. Satoh said he liked Kenshin's character to the point of enjoying role in the three films. However, the actor expressed pressure in doing the role as a result of having to take part in multiple fighting scenes. Nevertheless, Satoh said he enjoyed Kenshin's lines due to the impact they have on most characters, most notably his enemies. The film was released on August 25, 2012, and the staff "aims to release the film internationally and eventually make a series.

In 2012, Nobuhiro Watsuki revealed that he never turns down an offered project, whether it is a film, anime or game and that the first offer for a live-action film adaptation of Rurouni Kenshin came shortly after the manga ended. But that fizzled out before any real discussions had begun, so he felt a film would never happen. He got another offer about three years ago and it finally came to fruition after lengthy discussions. Watsuki said he was only involved in the script-writing phase, writing the first half and checking the second half written by others, but was told the script could be changed at the director's discretion. The original creator said he was by and large pleased with the film.

In casting Satoh, Ōtomo said the actor was a good fit for the character, citing their physical similarities. Producer Shinzō Matsuhashi shared similar feelings as Ōtomo. During the making of this film, both Watsuki and his wife found Satoh as an ideal actor him. After choosing Takeru Satoh as the lead, producer Shinzō Matsuhashi commented, "Satoh has the looks and stature to be a proper Kenshin." Watsuki added that when this project was just starting, he and his wife were discussing who should play Kenshin, and decided that Satoh topped the list.

Satoh later commented, "The role of Kenshin is that of a well-known character, therefore, I think fascinating acting is needed. I would like to create the Kenshin image with the staff, while staying true to the details. I will try my best, so please look forward to it." Satoh began intensive training in sword-fighting while shooting the movie.

Watsuki praised Satoh being cast for the role: "When this project just started, my wife and I were talking about who would suit the role of Kenshin, and Satoh Takeru-san was the one who came up on our mind first. So, when it was confirmed (that Satoh will be taking the role), I was surprised, but was also very happy. I'm looking forward to seeing his wonderful acting."

== Release ==
Rurouni Kenshin was theatrically released by Warner Bros. Pictures Japan on August 25, 2012, in Japan. The film was released in South Korea for the Busan International Film Festival on October 5 and for Spain in the annual Sitges Film Festival on October 10. It was also theatrically released in the Philippines on December 5 (SM Cinema) gaining second place in the Philippine Box Office on its first week. The film debuted in Hong Kong on December 6.

It was released in DVD and Blu-ray in Japan on December 26. The film has been licensed for distribution in over 60 countries in Europe, Latin America and Asia. Limited edition came in a special box, with special digipack, a soundtrack, and a Rurouni Kenshin notebook. Other content also include cast and staff commentary, TV spots, behind-the-scenes, and all the trailers included, plus One OK Rock's PV of their song "The Beginning".

The film was released in North America on December 14 for the LA EigaFest 2012 and was held in conjunction with the American Cinematheque at the Egyptian Theatre in Hollywood. The director, Keishi Ōtomo, attended the premiere and opening red carpet ceremony. In addition to Rurouni Kenshin, the 2012 line up features some of the films to come out of Japan over the last year. A special screening of four selected short films will be presented in collaboration with the Short Shorts Film Festival & Asia.

The film was released on Blu-ray and DVD in North America by Funimation Films on November 1, 2016, under the title Rurouni Kenshin Part I: Origins, which includes an English dubbed version of the film, with a TV-MA rating.

== Reception ==
=== Box office ===
The film became Japan's eleventh highest-grossing film of 2012, earning ¥3.01 billion at the Japanese box office that year. Internationally, the film grossed $37.7 million.

=== Critical reception ===
The film received mostly positive reviews from critics. Deborah Young, writing for The Hollywood Reporter, praised the film in the Busan Film Festival, saying that the "choreography is fast and furious and the sword fights ably showcase Battosai's incredible skills. Naoki Satō's energetic score pounds out the action scenes to a barbarian beat". Michelle Nguyen of Geek.com felt the film "treats the source material with respect and love" and said that it "...is many things: part Japanese historical drama, part action movie, and part nostalgic emotional journey."

Nick Creamer of Anime News Network awarded the film an "A−", stating that "Kenshin: Origins smartly leans on one of the source material's great advantages: the inherently compelling nature of the transition from the Tokugawa to the Meiji era. Much of the film's thematic and emotional power comes from the poignancy of that transition – more than just a tale of samurai clashes, it presents an argument for both the great and terrible sides of both eras."

A more negative review came from Variety, with Hong Kong critic Maggie Lee, who criticized the romance as "passionless", the supporting roles as "flat", and writing that "Even though the 134-minute pic perks up whenever there's an action sequence, the story is too pedestrian to engage, and the excitement dips whenever dramatic exposition takes over."

Watsuki overall praised the film. During an interview with Weekly Shonen Jump Alpha, he commented, "It was right on! Takeru Satoh played Kenshin's dual personality well. He truly was Kenshin. Yōsuke Eguchi who played Saitō Hajime, Kōji Kikkawa who played Udō Jin-e, and Munetaka Aoki who played Sagara Sanosuke really took on their characters' expressions and movements in the action sequences. It drew me in, especially the scene with Saitō's Gatotsu pose. It sent chills down my spine! I thought Emi Takei playing Kamiya Kaoru was really cute and Yū Aoi playing Takani Megumi was also fantastic, and in the film parts I felt I didn't explain well enough in the manga were improved. There were actually lines in the movie that made me think 'I want to use that line in the manga!'".

== Accolades ==
Award nominations for Rurouni Kenshin
Year	Award	Category	Recipient	Result
2012	Best Motion Picture	Sitges - Catalonian International Film Festival	Keishi Ōtomo	Nominated
2013	Newcomer of Year	Award of the Japanese Academy	Emi Takei	Nominated

== Sequels ==
When the film was first announced, it was reported that the production team had hopes to create a series. The August 2013 issue of Jump SQ. announced that a two-part sequel would be released simultaneously in the summer of 2014. These movies were tentatively known as Rurouni Kenshin: The Great Kyoto Fire Arc and The Last of a Legend Arc, and have Satoh Takeru, Takei Emi and Eguchi Yosuke reprising their roles as Kenshin, Kaoru and Saitō respectively. It was announced that Tatsuya Fujiwara was cast in the role of Shishio Makoto on July 2, as was director Keishi Ōtomo's return. On July 30, it was revealed that Ryunosuke Kamiki and Yūsuke Iseya were cast as Seta Sōjirō and Shinomori Aoshi. On August 4, 2013, actors Min Tanaka, Kazufumi Miyazawa, Yukiyoshi Ozawa, Maryjun Takahashi and Ryosuke Miura were unveiled as Nenji Kashiwazaki/Okina, Toshimichi Ōkubo, Hirobumi Itō, Yumi Komagata and Chō Sawagejō. Kaito Ōyagi replaced Taketo Tanaka as Yahiko. On August 30, 2013, Tao Tsuchiya was announced as popular character Makimachi Misao.

In April 2019, Warner Bros. Japan announced a fourth and fifth film were in production. Satoh reprised his role as Kenshin and Ōtomo returned to direct, the films were scheduled for a summer 2020 release. On May 27, 2020, it was announced on the official website that the release dates for the two sequels were postponed due to the COVID-19 pandemic. On December 4, 2020, the new dates were announced along with the sequel titles and renewed version of the movie poster. Rurouni Kenshin: The Final was released on April 23, 2021, while Rurouni Kenshin: The Beginning was released on June 4, 2021.
