= Rurouni Kenshin: Kyoto Inferno =

2014 Japanese film

- Theatrical release poster

Japanese name
- Kanji: るろうに剣心 京都大火編
Transcriptions
- Revised Hepburn: Rurouni Kenshin: Kyoto Taika-hen
- Directed by: Keishi Ōtomo
- Screenplay by: Kiyomi Fujii; Keishi Ōtomo
- Based on: Rurouni Kenshin by Nobuhiro Watsuki
- Produced by: Satoshi Fukushima
- Starring: Takeru Satoh; Emi Takei; Yūsuke Iseya; Munetaka Aoki; Yū Aoi; Ryūnosuke Kamiki; Masaharu Fukuyama; Yōsuke Eguchi; Tatsuya Fujiwara
- Cinematography: Takuro Ishizaka
- Edited by: Tsuyoshi Imai
- Music by: Naoki Satō
- Production companies: Warner Bros. Pictures Japan; Amuse Inc.; Shueisha; KDDI; GyaO!
- Distributed by: Warner Bros. Pictures
- Release date: August 1, 2014 (Japan)
- Running time: 138 minutes
- Country: Japan
- Language: Japanese
- Budget: $30 million (shared with The Legend Ends)
- Box office: $52.7 million (international)

Rurouni Kenshin: Kyoto Inferno (Japanese: るろうに剣心 京都大火編, Hepburn: Rurouni Kenshin: Kyoto Taika-hen), also known as Rurouni Kenshin Part II: Kyoto Inferno in North America, is a 2014 Japanese jidaigeki action film based on the Rurouni Kenshin manga series, and serves as the second installment of the Rurouni Kenshin film series', following the first film Rurouni Kenshin (2012). The story follows Himura Kenshin as he heads to Kyoto to face a powerful group led by Shishio Makoto, a man who wants to rule Japan after being betrayed by the government.

Rurouni Kenshin: Kyoto Inferno released in Japan on August 1, 2014, by Warner Bros. Pictures Japan, and received positive reviews from critics. The film was followed by a direct sequel, Rurouni Kenshin: The Legend Ends, which released the following month, and takes place immediately from the ending of Kyoto Inferno.

== Plot ==
In Settsu Mine, Hyōgo Prefecture, Saitō Hajime leads the Japanese police in tracking Shishio Makoto, a notorious renegade who was betrayed by the government after he had helped them defeat the Tokugawa shogunate during the Battle of Toba–Fushimi. However, Shishio's men ambush and massacre the police in the mine; Shishio tells Saitō his plan to conquer Japan before leaving.

After the events of the first film, Himura Kenshin continues to live in the kenjutsu dojo of Kamiya Kaoru alongside Myōjin Yahiko, Sagara Sanosuke, and Takani Megumi. He is called by a government official, Ōkubo Toshimichi, to track down Shishio, who is terrorizing Kyoto and its surroundings. Though he declines the request at first, he relents when the official is murdered by Seta Sōjirō, Shishio's underling. Just after Kenshin's departure, an individual arrives at Tokyo and searches for him, beating Sanosuke along the way.

While on the way, Kenshin meets with Makimachi Misao, who attempts to steal his sakabatō sword. While the two converse, they are alerted by a boy to the plight of his parents and brother, all of whom are killed by Shishio's men for trying to report their atrocities to their village to the authorities. Kenshin beats Shishio's men, though his identity as Hitokiri Battōsai is revealed. Kenshin is taken to Shishio himself, the latter ordering Sōjirō to duel Kenshin, which ends with Sōjirō breaking Kenshin's sakabatō. As he leaves the scene, Kenshin urges the villagers, including the orphaned boy, not to take their revenge against Shishio's men.

Arriving at Kyoto, Kenshin is asked by Misao, who is impressed by his words, to take shelter at an inn run by Kashiwazaki Nenji, actually a semi-retired ninja called Okina once employed by the Tokugawa shogunate known as the Oniwabanshu who were previously employed by the Tokugawa shogunate; Misao herself is also an aspiring ninja. Okina warns Kenshin that a lieutenant of his, Shinomori Aoshi (the one who beat Sanosuke previously), has made it his life goal to kill the strongest man in Japan - Kenshin.

Meanwhile, Kaoru decides to follow Kenshin to Kyoto, accompanied by Yahiko and Sanosuke. At the same time, Kenshin discovers that the person who made his sakabatō, Arai Shakku, has died years before. His son, Seikū, initially refuses Kenshin's plea for another sakabatō, but when one of Shishio's elite warriors, Sawagejō Chō, kidnaps his baby, Seikū asks Kenshin to defeat him. Seikū gives him a twin of the previous sakabatō, which Kenshin uses to defeat Chō. By interrogating Chō, the government learns that Shishio plans to raze Kyoto to the ground that night. The government police, together with Kenshin, the Oniwabanshū ninja, and the newly arrived Kaoru, Yahiko, and Sanosuke, battle Shishio's men. To prevent Aoshi from disturbing Kenshin, Okina challenges his former pupil to duel, which ends in his defeat. Kenshin soon realizes that Shishio's main goal is to set fire to Tokyo, and Kyoto was merely a diversion.

Kenshin discovers Shishio's ship leaving after following Sōjirō, who has kidnapped Kaoru. There he battles with Shishio, which ends when Kaoru is thrown over board and Kenshin jumps into the sea after her. The film ends with a mysterious man finding Kenshin's unconscious body washed up on the beach and carries him away.

== Cast ==
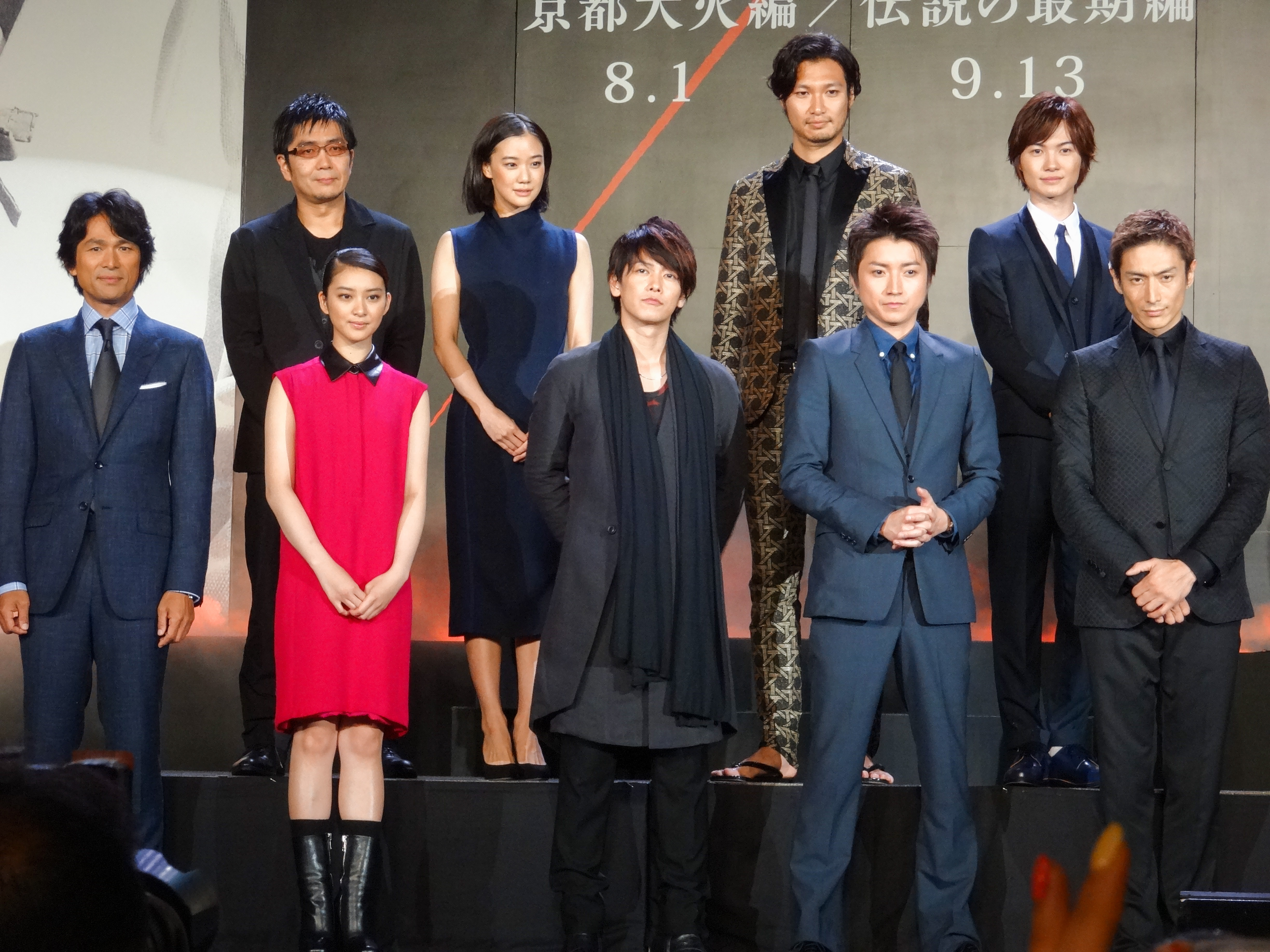
The cast at the premiere

Principal cast list as presented on the Funimation Films website in Western name order:

- Takeru Satoh as Kenshin Himura
- Emi Takei as Kaoru Kamiya
- Munetaka Aoki as Sanosuke Sagara
- Yū Aoi as Megumi Takani
- Kaito Oyagi as Yahiko Myōjin
- Yōsuke Eguchi as Hajime Saitō
- Tatsuya Fujiwara as Makoto Shishio
- Ryunosuke Kamiki as Sōjirō Seta
- Maryjun Takahashi as Yumi Komagata
- Ryosuke Miura as Chō Sawagejō
- Tao Tsuchiya as Misao Makimachi
- Min Tanaka as Okina
- Masaharu Fukuyama as Seijūrō Hiko

Yūsuke Iseya makes his first appearance in the film series as Aoshi Shinomori.
Miyazawa Kazufumi as Ōkubo Toshimichi, one of historical Three Great Nobles of the Restoration

== Production ==
Rurouni Kenshin: Kyoto Inferno was shot in a variety of locations around Japan, including Tokyo, Kyoto, Nagano, Ibaraki, and Kanagawa. Over 5000 extras were hired for the production, and filming wrapped on December 27, 2013.

For the Kyoto duology films, director Keishi Ōtomo said he did not have to put much advice to Takeru Satoh as his acting in the first film attracted multiple positive reactions by the staff and the audience. He then stated "Even without saying this or that from the side, he created an image of Kenshin, including his behavior, swordplay, and speech, through the necessary preparation and hard work. So I didn't worry at all".

Due to the Kyoto films showing a darker characterization of Kenshin as he struggles against different strong rivals, Satoh also said his work became more challenging. Still, he found it interesting. A scene that Satoh enjoyed was Kenshin's fight against Sawagejō Chō due to the fact Kenshin is forced to attack his enemy even though he does not know his weapon is deadly which goes against his morals; as a result, Satoh briefly showed Kenshin's hitokiri side for a brief moment. The actor said he discussed this scene with the director who was pleased with the result.

=== Music ===
One Ok Rock's song "Mighty Long Fall" from their seventh album, 35xxxv, is featured in the movie.

== Release ==
Rurouni Kenshin: Kyoto Inferno was released theatrically by Warner Bros. Pictures Japan in Japan on August 1, 2014. It was later released on Blu-ray and DVD on December 17.

In June 2016, Funimation Films announced that they acquired the rights to the Rurouni Kenshin live-action trilogy for American distribution, and released subtitled in American theaters in September 2016. The film was released on Blu-ray and DVD by Funimation on December 6, 2016, in North America which includes an English dubbed version of the film, with TV-MA rating.

== Reception ==
=== Box office ===
At the box office the movie earned a total of $52.9 million internationally. The film also held the top spot at the box office in Japan during its first week. It was the third highest-grossing film of 2014 at the Japanese box office with ¥5.22 billion. The film made its United States premiere at LA EigaFest 2014.

=== Critical reception ===
The film received positive reviews from critics, with widespread praise regarding the film's action direction and fight choreography conducted by Kenji Tanigaki. Christopher O'Keeffe of TwitchFilm declared that the film "Delivers grand thrills" and "Satisfies with its mix of character drama and sword fights as it leads up to an intense battle on the streets of ancient Kyoto. By the time the sea-set finale roles around, everything is left in balance for what promises to be an epic ending to this thrilling tale." Marcus Goh of Yahoo! praised the film, stating that "Kyoto Inferno is a wonderfully executed adaptation that manages to wield together all the highlights of the manga and anime, while still fully utilising the film medium to tell its tale. Despite being the first part of a two-part sequel, it manages to be a self-sufficient, coherent story – not an easy feat for a two-part sequel." Anime News Network enjoyed the film for expanding the lore by introducing new enemies and settings with entertaining fight scenes superior to the ones from the first movie but felt the film suffered from being filled with several sidecharacters and subplots.

Remy Van Ruiten praised the film, stating that "Rurouni Kenshin: Kyoto Inferno is a fantastic movie...Even in the age of a high budget Marvel Cinematic Universe, Rurouni Kenshin: Kyoto Inferno is a very rare treat. As there aren't as many of these movies being made based on anime of this caliber and the few that do get made avoiding sticking to the same formula, both overall and for the choreography during the battles, the experience still manages to feel fresh."

Mikhail Lecaros of GMA News Online stated "Ohtomo presents Kyoto Inferno with deliberate pacing, making the most of his now-extended runtime (Kyoto Inferno and The Legend Ends were filmed simultaneously), wisely giving the film moments to breathe. When the prerequisite sword fights and various punch-ups do show up, they are pitch-perfect live action extrapolations of the hand-drawn scenes that have enthralled fans for the past fifteen years." Jahanzeb Khan of Snap Thirty awarded the film an "A" rating, and goes on to describe how "Kyoto Inferno does an excellent job of setting the scene for the epic conclusion that follows in The Legend Ends, and without this methodological build up the grand finale in the third film would not have the same weight to it at all."

== Accolades ==
Award nominations for Rurouni Kenshin: Kyoto Inferno
Year	Award	Category	Recipient	Result
2016	Asian Film Festival of Dallas	Audience Award	Keishi Ōtomo	Won

== Sequel ==
A direct sequel, Rurouni Kenshin: The Legend Ends, released on September 13, 2014. The film takes place immediately after the ending of Kyoto Inferno
