= School (2011 TV series) =

Japanese television series

- poster
- Directed by: Hijikata Masato, Iwata Kazuyuki, Hirano Shin
- Starring: Yōsuke Eguchi
- Theme music composer: Sambomaster
- Country of origin: Japan
- Original language: Japanese
- No. of seasons: 1
- No. of episodes: 10

Production
- Running time: 54 minutes

Original release
- Network: Fuji TV
- Release: January 16 – March 20, 2011

School!! (スクール!!, Sukūru!!) is a Japanese television series which premiered on Fuji TV on January 16, 2011. It was aired on Fuji TV's Sunday 9:00pm slot "Dramatic Sunday" in the 2011 winter drama season.

== Plot ==
The story is about Shingū Elementary School which is beset by a lot of problems. Seichiro Naruse, a construction worker whose company closed down, suddenly becomes the principal of his old school. He must save the school from closing down.

== Cast ==
=== Main cast ===
- Yōsuke Eguchi as Seichiro Naruse

The construction company he was working in went bankrupt and he was appointed as the civilian principal of the Shingū Elementary School. Having devoted 20 years in the construction industry, he has no teaching license. He takes up the job in order to keep a promise he made with his former teacher and ex-principal Takeichi. Nonetheless, he has a cheerful personality and takes positive action at every turn, and he frequently describes himself as a "X X demon". He was greatly appalled by the appearance and the change in his alma mater, which was struggling to change the status quo. In the last episode, Shingū Elementary School narrowly avoided closing down, but at the same time, he resigned to take responsibility for the incident that was caused by Akira Hara in the school.

- Hidetoshi Nishijima as Iori Kirihara

He is the class teacher and curriculum coordinator for the sixth graders in Shingū Elementary School. Born April 10, 1971, he graduated from the Tokyo Gakugei University. Being one of the super-primary school teachers from the District Board of Education, he has the confidence from other faculty members. The realist can compete with Naruse and they are at odds with each other. He observes the students better than any other teacher and actually knows about the situation. He was transferred to Shingū Elementary School because of the accusation that he used violence on a student eight years ago. He used to be as enthusiastic as Naruse, but changed as a result of that incident.

- Kie Kitano as Kanoko Takeichi
- Takashi Tsukamoto as Hitoshi Ohashi
- Ittoku Kishibe as Mikishiro Takechi
- Miwako Ichikawa as Yukie Okamoto

She is the school nurse and a Gundam otaku. She is indifferent to politics in school, and owns a number of Gundam models. She is very sensitive of her own age and was the first amongst the school staff to know about the Kirihara's incident eight years ago.

- Shohei Miura as Yuichi Motoki
- Keiko Horiuchi as Yuriko Yoshimura
- Sansei Shiomi as Kujooro Wakiya

=== Students ===
- Abe Kōshō as Abe Takashi
- Nana Akashi as Nana Ishida
- Satoshinori Ichikawa as Ichimura Satoshinori
- Ayanatsu Itō as Kasumi Ito
- Shigeru Agatsuma as Ueno Shigeru
- Daiki Dakeyū as Daiki Dake
- Shārokku Reira as Reira Ogasawara
- Ābīarīya Asuka as Kyanberu Asuka
- Shimizu Yūshiya as Shimizu Toshiya

== Episodes ==
| | Episode title | Romanized title | Translation of title | Broadcast date | Ratings |
|---|---|---|---|---|---|
| Ep. 1 | 本気で怒れ笑え泣け ガテン系の熱血民間人校長がやって来た!! | Honki de okore warae nake Gaten-kei no nekketsu minkan-jin kōchō ga yattekita!! | All cry, laugh and be angry with your heart! Here comes the enthusiastic civilian principal!! | January 16, 2011 | 11.0% |
| Ep. 2 | 本気で遊べ! 恋をしろ!! | Honki de asobe! Koi o shiro!! | Play seriously! Love seriously!! | January 23, 2011 | 8.9% |
| Ep. 3 | 本気で子供のために泣け!! | Honki de kodomo no tame ni nake! | Crying for the children with all my heart! | January 30, 2011 | 8.6% |
| Ep. 4 | 教師の不登校って何なんだ | Kyōshi no fu tōkōtte nani nan da | A teacher that plays truant. Where is the decency? | February 6, 2011 | 7.8% |
| Ep. 5 | 一緒に帰る場所は学校だ!! | Issho ni kaeru basho wa gakkōda!! | School is a place where we can be together!! | February 13, 2011 | 7.7% |
| Ep. 6 | 天国のわが子に誓ったこと | Tengoku no wagako ni chikatta koto | An oath to my son in heaven | February 20, 2011 | 7.7% |
| Ep. 7 | 何が、教師の現実で限界だ | Nani ga, kyōshi no genjitsu de genkaida | What is the realistic boundary of a teacher's job | February 27, 2011 | 8.1% |
| Ep. 8 | この手で殴りたい | Kono te de naguritai | I want to use my fist and punch you all | March 6, 2011 | 9.8% |
| Ep. 9 | その手を掴む勇気を持て!! 子供の危機か?廃校の危機か? | Sono te o tsukamu yūki o mote!! Kodomo no kiki ka? Haikō no kiki ka? | Grab his hand and courageously move forward! The problem of the children? The danger of the school closing? | March 20, 2011 | 9.7% |
| Ep. 10 | 民間人校長先生、涙の選択!! 切り開けよ希望の道 | Minkan-jin kōchō sensei, namida no sentaku!! Kirihirakeyo kibō no michi | The sad choice of the civilian principal!! Opening up a path of hope | March 20, 2011 | 9.7% |
Ratings for Kanto region (average rating: 9.2%)

- All ratings are by Video Research, Ltd..
- Due to the 2011 Japanese earthquake, episode 9 was delayed and was broadcast together with episode 10.

== Awards ==
Yōsuke Eguchi was placed 5th in best actor award for his role in this drama in the Nikkan Sports Drama Grand Prix (2011 winter season) with 227 votes.

| Preceded by Perfect Report (17/10/2011 - 19/12/2011) | Fuji TV Dramatic Sunday ドラマチック・サンデー; Sundays 21:00 - 21:54 (JST) | Succeeded by Marumo no Okite (24/4/2011 - 3/7/2011) |
