= Yōsuke Eguchi =

Japanese actor and singer (born 1967)

Yōsuke Eguchi 江口洋介
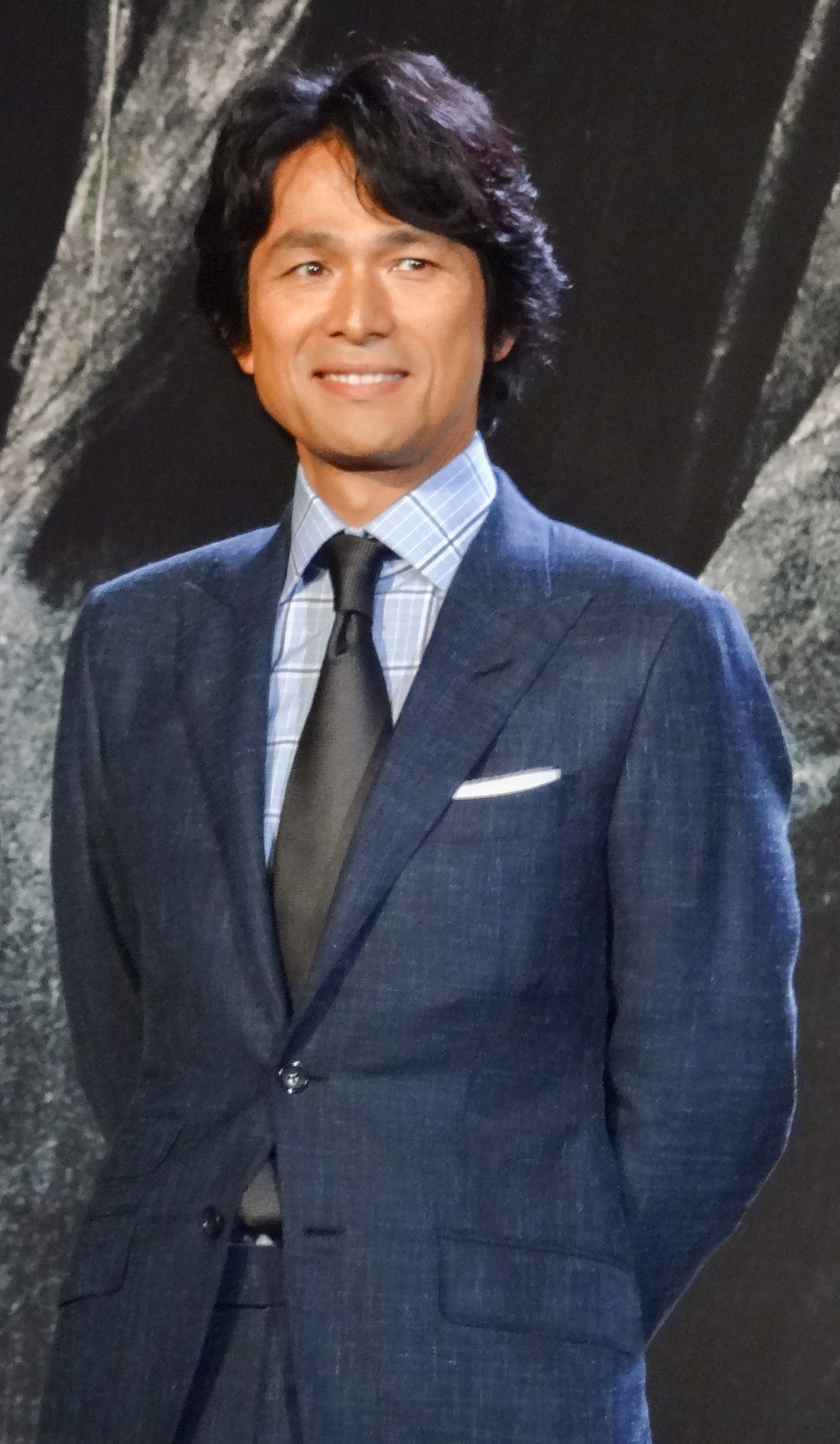
- Eguchi in 2014
- Born: December 31, 1967 (age 58); Kita-ku, Tokyo, Japan
- Occupations: Actor, singer
- Years active: 1986–present
- Spouse: Chisato Moritaka (m. 1999)
- Children: 2

Yōsuke Eguchi (江口 洋介, Eguchi Yōsuke; born December 31, 1967) is a Japanese actor and singer. Since 1986, he has appeared in a number of television series and movies.

== Personal life ==
He is married to the singer-songwriter Chisato Moritaka, with whom he has a son and a daughter.

== Filmography ==
=== Film ===
Year	Film	Role	Notes	Ref(s)
1986	Onyanko the Movie Kiki ippatu!	Marathon Boy		
1987	Shonan bakusozoku: Bomber Bikers of Shonan	Yōsuke Eguchi	Lead role	
1992	Shichi-nin no otaku: cult seven	Takashi Tagawa		
1994	Hero Interview	Mizushima		
1996	The Legend of Homo-Aquarellius	Haoka		
1996	Swallowtail	Ryou Ryanki		
1998	April Story	Oda Nobunaga		
1999	Shooting Star	Kawasaki		
2000	Another Heaven	Manabu Hayase	Lead role	
2002	Ryoma's Wife, Her Husband and Her Lover	Torazo		
2002	Madness in Bloom	Sweeper Saburo		
2005	Synesthesia	Shinsuke Hayama	Lead role	
2005	Samurai Commando: Mission 1549	Yusuke Kashima	Lead role	
2006	Silk	Hashimoto	Taiwanese film	
2007	Tonari machi sensō	Shuji Kitahara	Lead role	
2007	Unfair: The Movie	Jin Saiki		
2007	The Haunted Samurai	Katsu Kaishū		
2008	Shaolin Girl	Kenji Iwai		
2008	Children of the Dark	Hiroyuki Nanbu	Lead role	
2009	Goemon	Goemon Ishikawa	Lead role	
2010	Permanent Nobara	Kashima		
2011	Patisserie Coin de rue	Ryōtarō Tomura	Lead role	
2012	Rurouni Kenshin	Saitō Hajime		
2014	Rurouni Kenshin: Kyoto Inferno	Saitō Hajime		
2014	Rurouni Kenshin: The Legend Ends	Saitō Hajime		
2015	The Big Bee	Kazuaki Yuhara	Lead role	
2016	A Living Promise	Tetsuya Watanabe		
2017	Napping Princess	Momotarō Morikawa	Voice	
2018	The Blood of Wolves	Moritaka Ichinose		
2018	Bleach	Isshin Kurosaki		
2019	The Confidence Man JP: The Movie	Eisuke Akaboshi		
2020	The Confidence Man JP: Episode of the Princess	Eisuke Akaboshi		
2020	I Never Shot Anyone	Shūhei Moriyama		
2021	Rurouni Kenshin: The Final	Saitō Hajime		
2021	Rurouni Kenshin: The Beginning	Saitō Hajime		
2022	The Confidence Man JP: Episode of the Hero	Eisuke Akaboshi		
2022	Akira and Akira	Kōji Fudō		
2022	7 Secretaries: The Movie	Keitarō Ban		
2022	The Lines That Define Me	Nishihama		
2023	Nemesis: The Mystery of the Golden Spiral	Kazuaki Kurita		
2023	The Silent Service	Wataru Unabara		
2023	Kyrie	Kazuhiko Shiomi		
2024	Teasing Master Takagi-san Movie	Mr. Tanabe		
2024	Gold Boy	Iwao		
2025	Under the Big Onion	Radio personality		
2025	The Silent Service: The Battle of the Arctic Ocean	Wataru Unabara		
2025	Tokyo MER: Mobile Emergency Room – Nankai Mission	Hidemi Makishi		
2026	Tokyo MER: Mobile Emergency Room – Capital Crisis	Hidemi Makishi		
2026	The Secret Battlefield	Yoshiho Nishimura		

=== Television ===
Year	Film	Role	Notes	Ref(s)
1989	Kasuga no Tsubone	Tokugawa Iemitsu	Taiga drama	
1991	Tokyo Love Story	Ken'ichi Mikami		
1991	101st Marriage Proposal	Junpei		
1992	In the Name of Love	Tokio Jinno		
1993–1997	Under the Same Roof	Tatsuya Kashiwagi	Lead role; 2 seasons	
1995	Love Us	Harumi Ide	Lead role	
1999–2026	Emergency Room 24 Hours	Kazuo Shindo	Lead role; 5 seasons	
2000	Ai o kudasai	Nagasawa		
2000	Namida o fuite	Katsuo Ohnishi	Lead role	
2000	Monariza no hohoemi	Masakyuki Tachibana	Lead role	
2002	The Queen of Lunchtime Cuisine	Yujiro Nabeshima		
2003	The Great White Tower	Shuji Satomi		
2004	Shinsengumi!	Sakamoto Ryōma	Taiga drama	
2006	Unfair: Code Breaking	Jin Saiki		
2006	Walkers		Lead role	
2009	Triangle	Ryoji Goda		
2009	The Policeman's Lineage	Anjo Seiji		
2011	School	Seichiro Naruse	Lead role	
2014	Gunshi Kanbei	Oda Nobunaga	Taiga drama	
2015	Shingari	Kajii		
2015	Lady Girls	Takayama Fumio		
2017	Black Leather Notebook	Tomio Yasujima		
2017	Ishitsubute	Teruaki Saimi		
2017	Chiisana Hashi de			
2018	BG: Personal Bodyguard	Yoshiaki Ochiai		
2018	The Confidence Man JP	Eisuke Akaboshi		
2019	The Eternal Nispa	Ōkubo Toshimichi	TV movie	
2020	Cold Case Season 3	Hideki Hyūga	Episodes 1 and 2	
2020	7 Secretaries	Keitarō Ban		
2021	Nemesis	Kazuaki Kurita		
2024	House of Ninjas	Soichi Tawara		
2024	Teasing Master Takagi-san	Mr. Tanabe		
2024	Someone in This Town	Yūichi Masaki	Lead role; miniseries	
2024–2027	The Silent Service	Wataru Unabara	2 seasons	
2025	Simulation: Defeat in the Summer of 1941	Yoshiho Nishimura	Miniseries	

=== Japanese dub ===
Year	Film	Role	Notes	Ref(s)
2019	The Lion King	Scar		

== Awards and nominations ==
Year	Award	Category	Work(s)	Result	Ref.
1992	1st TV Life Annual Drama Awards	Best Supporting Actor	Tokyo Love Story	Won	
