= Tōkyō Zenryoku Shōjo =

- Genre: Romance; Romance
- Written by: Kazuhiko Ban
- Starring: Emi Takei; Shohei Miura; Manami Higa; Takashi Tsukamoto; Atsuro Watabe
- Opening theme: On Shirazu by Nakajima Miyuki
- Country of origin: Japan
- Original language: Japanese
- No. of seasons: 1
- No. of episodes: 11

Original release
- Network: NTV
- Release: 10 October – 19 December 2012

Tōkyō Zenryoku Shōjo (東京全力少女, Tōkyō Zenryoku Shōjo) is a Japanese television drama series.

== Plot ==
"Don’t worry, mother. I’m going to Tokyo." 19-year-old Saeki Urara leaves behind a farewell letter to her mother Sayuri and boards a late-night highway bus bound for Tokyo. The day before was her nineteenth birthday and Sayuri had revealed that the father Urara had thought dead, is actually alive and she is carried away by an impulse to meet him. While Urara is grateful to her mother for raising her single-handedly after the divorce 15 years ago, she resolves to live in Tokyo, the glittering metropolis that she admires. Withdrawing the 620,000 yen that constitutes her entire savings, she leaves her hometown of Kagawa. Her father Suzuki Takuya lives in Tokyo, but she has not intention of depending on him. The next morning, Urara arrives in Tokyo. But not long after, she discovers that the envelope containing the 620,000 yen is missing from her bag. She suspects that it was Tamakawa Daisuke whom she met on the bus and recounted her story to, but his purpose seems to merely be to pick her up. At her wits end, Urara is introduced by Serizawa Hanako, whom she met at the Shimokitazawa flea market, to a shady man. The man who holds out 20,000 yen and declares "Buy pants" to a stunned Urara is her father whom she is seeing again for the first time in 15 years! --Jdramas Wordpress

== Cast ==
- Emi Takei as Urara Saeki
- Shohei Miura as Daisuke Tamagawa
- Manami Higa as Hanako Serizawa
- Takashi Tsukamoto as Koichi Sakurai
- Atsuro Watabe as Takuya Suzuki
