= Rise of the Rōnin =

2024 video game

- Developer: Team Ninja (Note: Additional work by PlayStation Studios XDev)
- Publishers: Sony Interactive Entertainment; Koei Tecmo (Windows)
- Director: Fumihiko Yasuda
- Producers: Fumihiko Yasuda; Edward Saito
- Programmers: Tetsuya Nagayama; Yutaro Takahashi
- Artists: Soma Yokoi; Nozomi Furuta; Hiroyuki Kato
- Writer: Jesse Noble
- Composer: Inon Zur
- Engine: Katana Engine
- Platforms: PlayStation 5; Windows
- Release: PlayStation 5; 22 March 2024; Windows; 11 March 2025
- Genre: Action role-playing
- Modes: Single-player, multiplayer

Rise of the Rōnin (Note: Japanese: ライズ オブ ローニン, Hepburn: Raizu obu rōnin) is a 2024 action-role playing game developed by Koei Tecmo's Team Ninja and published by Sony Interactive Entertainment for the PlayStation 5 and by Koei Tecmo for Windows. It is the third collaboration between Sony and Koei Tecmo after Nioh and its sequel. Upon release, the game received generally positive reviews from critics.

== Gameplay ==
Rise of the Rōnin allows players to create a custom character. Combat features a wide array of weapons common during the Boshin war, such as katanas and various Boshin war firearms. The game features story choices at key moments, allowing players to side with or fight against various non-player characters, affecting the story. Historic cities Yokohama, Kyoto and Edo can be explored, as well as areas in the countryside. The player can traverse with various means, such as a horse, grappling hook or glider. The game features the ability to swap between three difficulties, as well as a three player cooperative multiplayer mode.

== Story ==
=== Setting ===
Rise of the Rōnin is set in Yokohama, Edo and Kyoto, in the mid-19th century during Bakumatsu, the final years of the Edo period. The game depicts the leadup to the Boshin war between the Tokugawa Shogunate and various anti-shogunate factions displeased with the western influence after the forced reopening of Japan following the Sakoku period.

The story follows the Blade Twins, whose genders are selected by the player, and their involvement in the Veiled Edge resistance group after their family, Kurozuku clan was murdered by oniwaban working for the Shogunate due to the clan anti-shogunate ideology. Trained by the Veiled Edge's leader, the Bladesmith, the Blade Twins begin their mission to overthrow the Shogunate.

=== Plot ===
In the year 1853, the Blade Twins are tasked by the Bladesmith to assassinate Commodore Matthew Perry and steal a secret message in his possession. They are able to steal the message, but are unable to kill Perry due to the intervention of another assassin, the Blue Demon. Outmatched, one of the Blade Twins is forced to flee while their partner sacrifices themselves to ensure the Blade Twin's escape, now the Protagonist. After Shogunate oniwaban attack the Veiled Edge's village, the Protagonist believes that their partner is still alive and decides to desert the Veiled Edge to search for them. The Bladesmith forces the Protagonist into a duel to the death to win the right to abandon the clan, with the Protagonist prevailing and the Bladesmith wishing them luck with her dying breath.

The Protagonist makes their way to Yokohama in 1858, where they befriend wandering ronin Ryoma Sakamoto. The social order of Yokohama and all of Japan has been thrown into turmoil due to the arrival of the Perry Expedition and increasing Western influence in the country. As Ryoma searches for his master Shoin Yoshida with his fellow students, the Protagonist investigates the whereabouts of their partner, now known as Demonclaw Samurai, who is working for the Americans and British. Shogunate Chief Minister Naosuke Ii enacts harsh suppression and purges of anti-Shogunate and anti-foreigner sentiment, culminating in Shoin's arrest and execution in 1859 which angers Ryoma and his friends. Genzui Kusaka decides to take Shoin's place and rebel against the Shogunate, along with Kogoro Katsura, Shinsaku Takasugi, and others. They rally a small army to attack Ii directly. The Blue Demon, whose true identity is Akikatsu Manabe, attempts to protect Ii but is struck down by the Protagonist in retribution, and Ii is either successfully assassinated or manages to flee with a still-living Manabe, only to be dismissed from his position as Chief Minister, and subsequently assassinated later by the Blade Twin. As a result of Ii's death, American influence in Japan wanes as British influence strengthens, led by Ernest Satow and Rutherford Alcock.

In 1863, the Protagonist continues working with Ryoma's group in Edo upon learning the Blade Twin is collaborating with the British. After Genzui brazenly burns down the British Legation, Ryoma begins to balk at Genzui's increasingly violent methods. Genzui sets his next target as Kaishu Katsu, an important Shogunate official. The Protagonist and Ryoma attack Katsu, who easily fights them off and instead wins them to his side by telling them his desire to reform the Shogunate and modernize Japan without the use of violence. They assist Katsu in recruiting additional followers to his cause. Eventually, they meet the Shogun Yoshinobu Tokugawa himself, who expresses his own desire to modernize Japan to match the West. Yoshinobu decides to travel to Kyoto as part of a ploy to lure his enemies into the open, and Katsu requests the Protagonist and Ryoma to join the Roshigumi to protect Yoshinobu. However, shortly after their arrival in Kyoto in 1864, the leader of the Roshigumi, Kiyokawa Hachirō, is assassinated by the Blade Twin and exposed as a traitor, throwing the organization in chaos. Roshigumi is disbanded, some of its members returning to Edo while those remaining in Kyoto form the Shinsengumi.

Sensing weakness, Genzui leads the Choshu clan to attack Kyoto. The Shinsengumi, along with the Satsuma clan armed with British cannons, are able to defeat the Choshu. The Protagonist confronts the Blade Twin, who reveals that they have been behind many of the events accelerating the Shogunate's decline as revenge for their village's destruction. The Protagonist disagrees with the Blade Twin's path of violence and refuses to join forces with them. The Blade Twin flees while Genzui commits seppuku to avoid capture. Realizing that both the Satsuma and Choshu want to overthrow the Shogunate, in 1866 Ryoma manages to convince Satsuma general Takamori Saigo to join forces with the Choshu despite being traditional enemies, forming the Choshu-Satsuma Alliance. Shortly after, the Protagonist infiltrates the Shinsengumi to investigate an assassination attempt on Ryoma. The Protagonist roots out the traitor within the Shinsengumi and accompanies Ryoma to the Shogun's palace, where they manage to thwart an attempt by Satow to assassinate Yoshinobu and convince the latter to dissolve the Shogunate and effect a peaceful transition of power.

In 1867, despite Yoshinobu engaging in negotiations with the Choshu-Satsuma alliance, the Blade Twin begins to stage false flag attacks to stoke tensions between the two sides, culminating in them attempting to assassinate Ryoma, who envisions a Japan under democratic rule. Ryoma is either killed or severely wounded. Without Ryoma's mediating influence, relations between the Shogunate and the alliance collapse, leading to the Boshin War in 1868. After an assassination attempt by the Blade Twin, Yoshinobu is forced to retreat to Edo, allowing the alliance forces to seize Kyoto after the Battle of Toba-Fushimi. Katsu makes plans to burn down Edo to prevent its capture, but the Protagonist is able to negotiate a peaceful settlement between the two sides that spares the city. As the peace talks are being finalized, the Protagonist confronts and defeats the Blade Twin one last time, choosing to either spare or execute them. If spared, the partner comes to realize the error of their ways, and as penance decides to leave Japan to observe its development from afar.

Afterwards, the Shogunate is dissolved and Yoshinobu retires to live quietly as a civilian while the leaders of the Choshu-Satsuma alliance begin the process of reorganizing Japan's government as well as rapidly modernizing its army and navy, while the remnants of the Shogunate and Shinsengumi sail towards Hakodate to form the Republic of Ezo. If the player manages to save Ryoma's life and spares the Blade Twin, a post-credits cutscene shows the two of them running into each other in New York City.

== Development ==
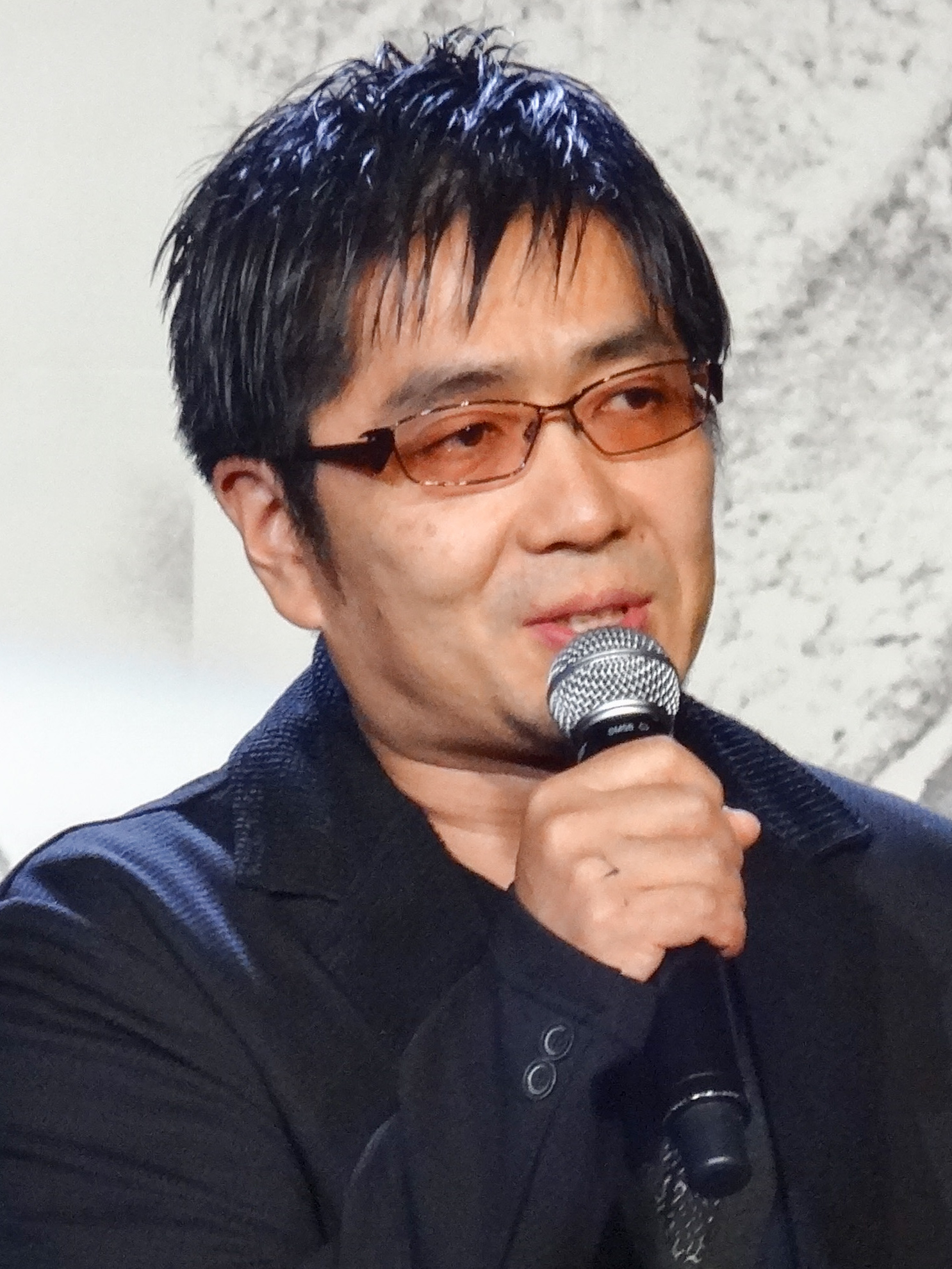
Keishi Ōtomo, the game's Opening and Real-Time Cinematics Director, pictured in 2014

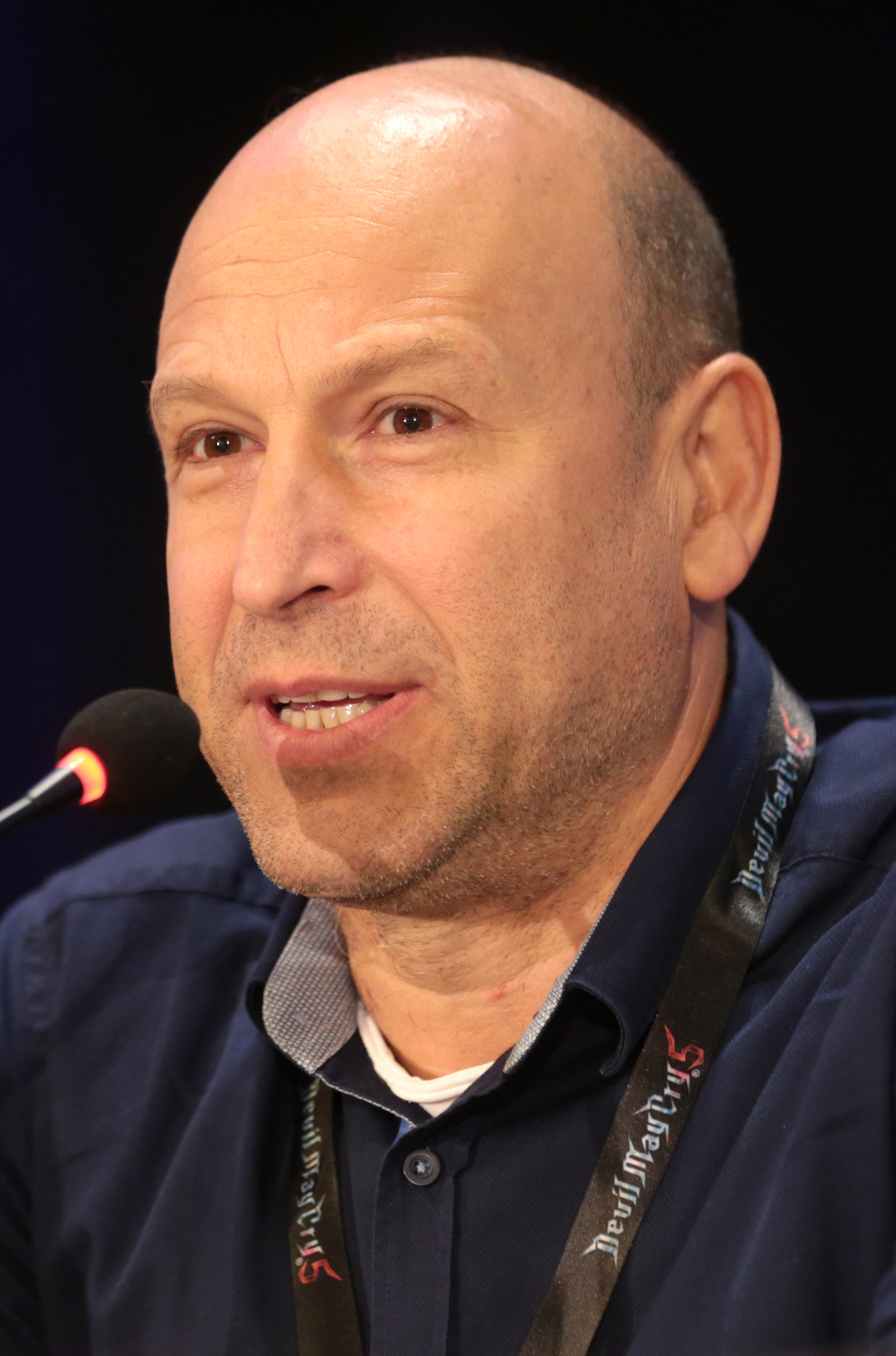
Inon Zur, the game's composer, pictured in 2018

Development on Rise of the Rōnin started in 2015, with PlayStation Studios' XDev assisting. According to Team Ninja president Fumihiko Yasuda, they wanted to create a game that depicts Japan in its darkest times, citing the Bakumatsu-period as an era video games would "shy away from". The game's setting would also lend itself well to their expertise, due to their experience making games focused on ninja and samurai, such as Ninja Gaiden and Nioh. According to Yasuda, Rise of the Rōnin is the most ambitious project Team Ninja has developed. Developing an open world title has been a particular challenge for Team Ninja, as they only developed linear, level-based games until now. Yasuda cited creating passive non-player characters as "impactful" and "challenging", as in their previous titles everything on-screen was for the player to defeat.

Film director Keishi Ōtomo, well known for his work on the Rurouni Kenshin film series, served as the Opening and Real-Time Cinematics director for the game. Commenting on his work, Ōtomo stated he wanted to show the buildup of energy in the darkest moments of the Bakumatsu, as the people "waited for everything to implode". He was impressed by the attention to detail Team Ninja had in creating the world, noting they had done their historical research well.

Inon Zur composed the score for the game, with the two main instruments carrying most of the melodies being the cello and the shakuhachi. He took it upon himself to study Japanese music as part of the job and felt that writing the theme for the Blade Twin was the most challenging, noting that their actions were not purely good or evil, but considered to be "different" and contradicting the story of the protagonist.

== Release ==
Rise of the Rōnin was announced on 13 September 2022, at PlayStation's State of Play livestream. On 7 December 2023, at The Game Awards 2023, a pre-order trailer was released, with a release date of 22 March 2024. Pre-orders opened in Japan on 14 December 2023, revealing that the game would be sold in two versions, CERO D and CERO Z, due to the violence deemed to be excessive by the Computer Entertainment Rating Organization of Japan.

A playable demo was released on 24 July 2024, with progress being able to be carried over to the full game. A physical artbook released on 10 September 2024.

A Windows version was released on 11 March 2025 by Koei Tecmo. It adds features utilizing the capabilities of personal computers, including support for ultra-wide aspect ratios, up to 8K resolution support, 120 FPS support, AMD FSR, NVIDIA DLSS and Intel XeSS support, frame generation, ray tracing, and more.

=== South Korea controversy ===
Rise of the Rōnin will not release in South Korea. Early reports indicated that this is due to comments by Fumihiko Yasuda comparing Shoin Yoshida to Socrates, which sparked controversy in South Korea. Although Yoshida played a key role in the Meiji Restoration, he is also considered an integral person in what would lead Japan to conquer and occupy Korea. Sony later confirmed that the game would not release in South Korea, but did not provide an official reason.

Some Asian versions of the game came with Korean language support, and the game was also featured in the official South Korea PlayStation blog in its initial reveal in September 2022. However, said page has since been removed. All promotional videos for the game on the official Korean PlayStation YouTube channel have also been taken down.

== Reception ==
Reception

Aggregate score
Aggregator	Score
Metacritic	76/100

Review scores
Publication	Score
Digital Trends	3.5/5
Eurogamer	4/5
Famitsu	37/40
Game Informer	7/10
GameSpot	7/10
GamesRadar+	3.5/5
Hardcore Gamer	4/5
IGN	7/10
NME	4/5
Push Square	6/10
Shacknews	9/10
Video Games Chronicle	3/5
VG247	3/5
VideoGamer.com	6/10

=== Critical reception ===
Rise of the Rōnin received "generally favorable" reviews from critics, according to review aggregator website Metacritic. In Japan, four critics from Famitsu gave the game a total score of 37 out of 40.

In its FY2023 Annual Presentation Materials, Koei Tecmo noted that most critics praised the action and depth of Rōnin's combat systems, as well as the expanded story and setting at the end of the Edo period, although the quality of the game's visuals and open world design received criticism.

The PC port of the game was widely criticized for various performance issues upon release. In response, Team Ninja issued an apology on their Twitter account on 10 April 2025 before the fourth patch for the game was deployed, although several issues remained.

=== Sales ===
In Japan, Rise of the Rōnin sold 64,646 physical units during its first week, making it the third best-selling game behind Princess Peach: Showtime! and Dragon's Dogma 2. It had sold 128,110 physical units in Japan by 9 June 2024.

=== Accolades ===
Year	Ceremony	Category	Result	Ref.
2024	PlayStation Partner Awards	Special Award	Won	
2024	PlayStation Partner Awards	Users' Choice Award	Won	
2024	PlayStation Game Music Awards	Traditional Sound Award	Won	
2024	Famitsu Hall of Fame	Platinum Award (New Game Cross Review)	Won	
2024	Famitsu Dengeki Game Awards	Game Of The Year	Nominated	
2024	Famitsu Dengeki Game Awards	Best MVC (Game Developer/Studio)	Nominated	
2024	Famitsu Dengeki Game Awards	Best Voice Actor (Note: Katsuyuki Konishi as Takasugi Shinsaku)	Nominated	
2024	Famitsu Dengeki Game Awards	Best Characterization (Note: Sakamoto Ryoma)	Nominated	
2024	Famitsu Dengeki Game Awards	Best Action Adventure	Won	
