= Emi Takei =

Japanese actress and model

- 武井 咲
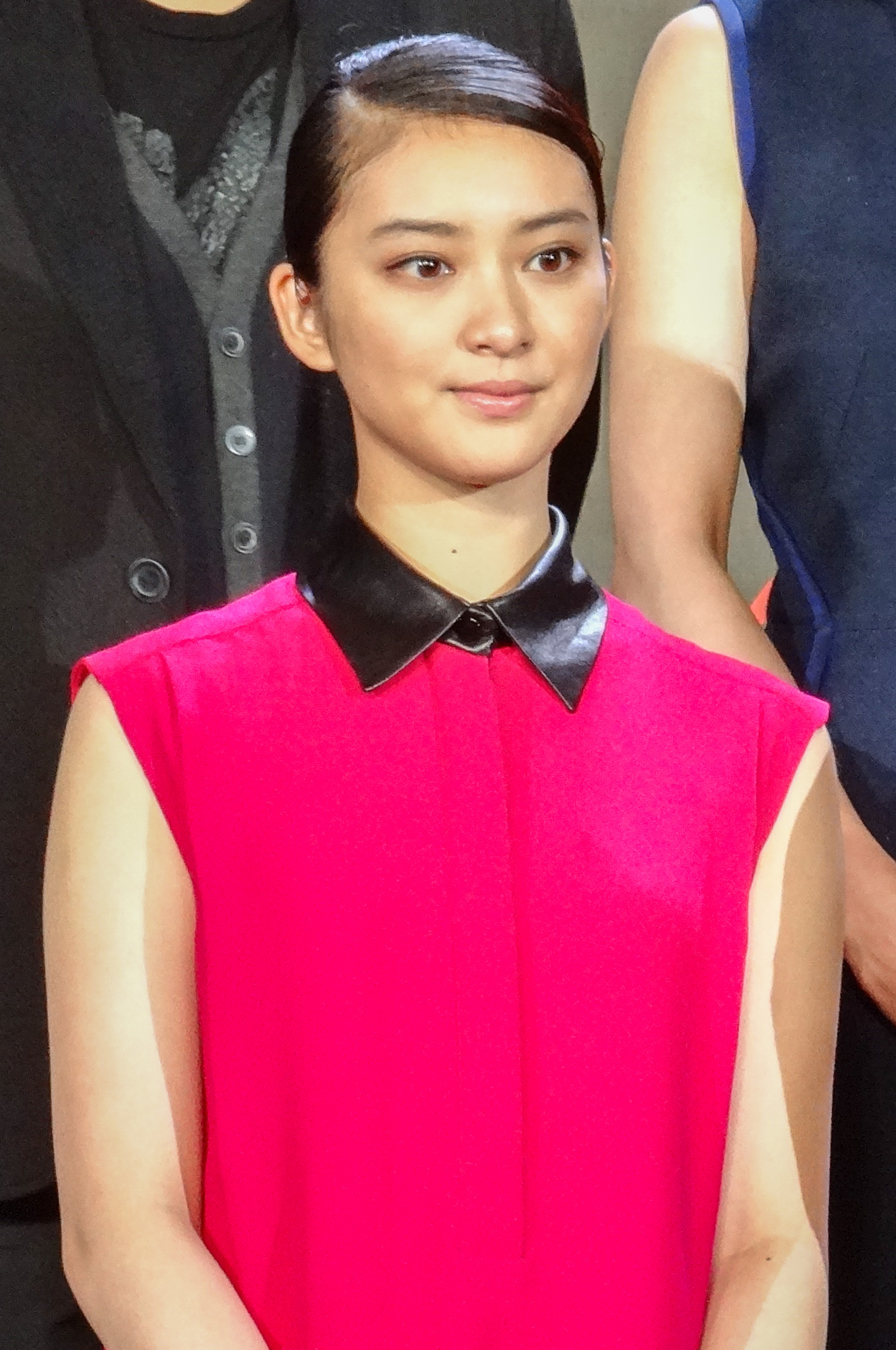
- Takei in June 2014
- Born: December 25, 1993 (age 32); Nagoya, Aichi, Japan
- Occupations: Actress; model
- Years active: 2007–present
- Agent: Oscar Promotion
- Height: 1.63 m (5 ft 4 in)
- Spouse: Takahiro Tasaki (m. 2017)
- Children: 3
- Website: oscarpro.co.jp

Emi Takei (武井 咲, Takei Emi; born December 25, 1993) is a Japanese actress and model.

== Biography ==
Takei was born in Nagoya. Aspiring to become a model, she declared to her parents on her entry to junior high school that she would become a model within three years. In 2006, she entered the 11th Japan Bishōjo Contest and won in not only one, but two categories: she received the Model Division Award and the Multi-Media Award.

She subsequently made her model debut in the November 2006 issue of Seventeen, which became her first job in the entertainment industry. In February 2007, she became a model exclusive to the magazine, and earned her first solo cover on the 15 February issue.

Starting in September 2010, she became the image character for "Beamie", an SNS website used by approximately 5,500 celebrities. In November the same year, she was the youngest ever in history to receive the "Best Dresser Award", an award from The Men's Fashion Unity since 1972.

In January 2011, she had her first appearance in the Fuji TV drama serial Taisetsu na Koto wa Subete Kimi ga Oshiete Kureta. She was picked by winning an audition in which eight hundred people attended to play a key person in a quasi-leading role in the drama. Soon after, she had her first starring role in TV Asahi drama serial Asuko March! in April.

She won the "Best Smile of the Year" award in November, and in December became the first Japanese person to be contracted with Italian luxury goods brand Gucci.

On December 12, 2011, she made her debut as a singer under Universal Japan, releasing the single "Koisuru Kimochi". The ballad was written for her by Glay's Takuro who declared himself as a big fan of Takei.

In August 2012, she graduated from being a Seventeen model after 5 years and 9 months.

== Appearances ==
=== TV dramas ===
- Otomen ~Summer~ (2009), Kuriko Tachibana
- Otomen ~Autumn~ (2009), Kuriko Tachibana
- Liar Game 2 (2010), Hiroka Saeki
- Gold (2010), Akira Saotome
- Taisetsu na Koto wa Subete Kimi ga Oshiete Kureta (2011), Hikari Saeki
- Asukō March! ~Kenritsu Asuka Kōgyō Kōkō Kōshinkyoku~ (2011), Nao Yoshino
- Honto ni Atta Kowai Hanashi Summer Special 2011 (2011), Kyoka Koyama
- Taira no Kiyomori Episode 14 - 43 (2012), Tokiwa Gozen
- W no Higeki (2012), Mako Watsuji/Satsuki Kurasawa
- Iki mo Dekinai Natsu (2012), Rei Tanizaki
- Flat Out Tokyo Girl (2012), Urara Saeki
- Otenki Oneesan (2013), Haruko Abe
- Kindaichi Kōsuke VS Akechi Kogorō (2013), Hatsue Yoshiike
- The Partner (2013), Akane Oiwa
- Umi no Ue no Shinryōjo (2013), Mako Togami
- Senryokugai Sōsakan (2014), Chinami Umidzuki
- Zero no Shinjitsu ~Kansatsui Matsumoto Mao~ (2014), Mao Matsumoto
- The Perfect Insider (2014), Moe Nishinosono
- Age Harassment (2015), Emiri Yoshii
- Seisei Suruhodo, Aishiteru (2016), Mia Kurihara
- Fragile (2016), Chihiro Miyazaki
- Setouchi Shonen Yakyu dan (2016), Komako Nakai
- Black Leather Notebook (2017), Motoko Haraguchi
- Ima kara Anata wo Kyouhaku Shimasu (2017)

=== Movies ===
- The Cherry Orchard: Blossoming (2008), Maki Mizuta
- For Love's Sake (2012), Ai Saotome
- Rurouni Kenshin (2012), Kamiya Kaoru
- Love for Beginners (2012), Tsubaki Hibino
- Rurouni Kenshin: Kyoto Inferno (2014), Kamiya Kaoru
- Rurouni Kenshin: The Legend Ends (2014), Kamiya Kaoru
- Clover (2014), Saya Suzuki
- Terra Formars (2016), Nanao Akita
- Rurouni Kenshin: The Final (2021), Kamiya Kaoru
- The Gate of Murder (2027), Yukiko Uehara

=== TV programs ===
- Unbelievable (April 2010-February 2011)
- K-Pop & Korean Dramas...Star ga Umareru Bashō ~Takei Emi and Youn-a Hanryū Roots e no Tabi~ (2011)
- Takei Emi 19sai no Kyūjitsu - Kankoku Hitori Tabi ~Micchaku! Sugao ni Modotta Mikakan~ (2013)

=== Radio ===
- Emi Takei and Rikao Yanagida's Radio Kūsō Kagaku Kenkyūsho (2010–present)
- Daiichi Seimei Takei Emi "Kyō no Ikku" (2012–present)

=== Voice acting ===
- Fast Five (2011), Elena Neves (Japanese dubbing)
- Doctor Lautrec and the Forgotten Knights (2011), Sophie Coubertin (Japanese release)
- Binary Domain (2012) - Yuki (Japanese release)
- Crayon Shin-chan: Serious Battle! Robot Dad Strikes Back (2014)
- Dragon Quest Heroes II (2016), Teresia
- Nioh (2017), Okatsu

=== Commercials ===
- Yokohama Hakkeijima Sea Paradise Petting Lagoon (2007)
- Takara Tomy Hi-kara (2008)
- Shiseido
  - Tsubaki Water (2010)
  - Maquillage (2011–present)
- Lotte
  - Ghana Milk Chocolate (2011–present)
  - Ghana Chocolate & Cookie Sandwich (2011–2012)
  - Fruitio (2012–present)
  - Fit's Link & Fruitio x Movie Rurouni Kenshin Tie-up Campaign (2012)
- SoftBank Mobile (2011)
- Coca-Cola Japan Sokenbicha (2011)
- ÆON (2011–present)
- MaxValu (2012–present)
- Nintendo "Rhythm Heaven Fever" (2011)
- Nissin Spa King (2011–present)
- Fast Five Movie (2011)
- NEC Personal Computer (2011–present)
- Sekisui Chemical Company Sekisui Heim (2011–present)
- Aoyama Trading Yōfuku no Aoyama (2011–present)
- Daiichi Seimei (2011–present)
- J Sports (2011–present)
- Tokyo Metro (2012–present)
- Tokyo Metropolitan Art Museum Mauritshuis Museum Exhibition (2012)
- JTB (2012–present)
- GREE Tsuri Star (2012–present)
- House Foods Toast Seasoning (2012–present)
- Seiko Lukia (2012–present)
- Mobcast Mobile Pro/Mobile Soccer (2013–present)
- Japanese Red Cross Society Hatachi no Kenketsu (2014–present)
- SSP Alesion 10 (2014–present)

=== Magazines ===
- Seventeen (February 2007-October 2012)- Exclusive model

=== Photobooks ===
- Kaze no Naka no Shōjo (Wani Books, October 28, 2010) ISBN 9784847043208
- Plumeria (Spirits Special Edition) (Shogakukan, June 20, 2011) ISBN 9784093637305
- Emi Takei Photobook Bloom (Kadokawa Shoten, June 6, 2015) ISBN 9784047319431

== Discography ==
=== Singles ===
Release date	Title	Oricon Weekly peak position
December 14, 2011	恋スルキモチ (Koisuru Kimochi)	6

== Awards and recognitions ==
2006
- 11th Japan Bishōjo Contest Model Division Award and Multi-Media Award
2011
- 68th Television Academy Awards - Best Supporting Actress for "Taisetsu na Koto wa Subete Kimi ga Oshiete Kureta"
- Vogue Japan Women of the Year 2011 Award
2012
- 2012 E-Line Beautiful Grand Prix (Japan Association of Adult Orthodontics)
- 24th Yamaji Fumiko Film Awards - Best New Actress Award
- 25th Nikkan Sports Film Award - Best Newcomer Award
- 54th FECJ Awards - Celebrity of the Year Award
2013
- 37th Elan d'or Awards - Best Newcomer Award
- 36th Japan Academy Film Prize - Best New Actor Award for "Rurouni Kenshin", "Ai to Makoto", "Kyō, Koi o Hajimemasu"
- 22nd Japanese Film Critics Awards - Best New Actress Award for "Kyō, Koi o Hajimemasu"
- 18th Vietnam Film Festival - Best Actress for "The Partner"
2015
- Japan Action Award 2015 - Best Action Actress for Rurouni Kenshin: Kyoto Inferno
