= Munetaka Aoki =

Japanese actor (born 1980)

- 青木 崇高
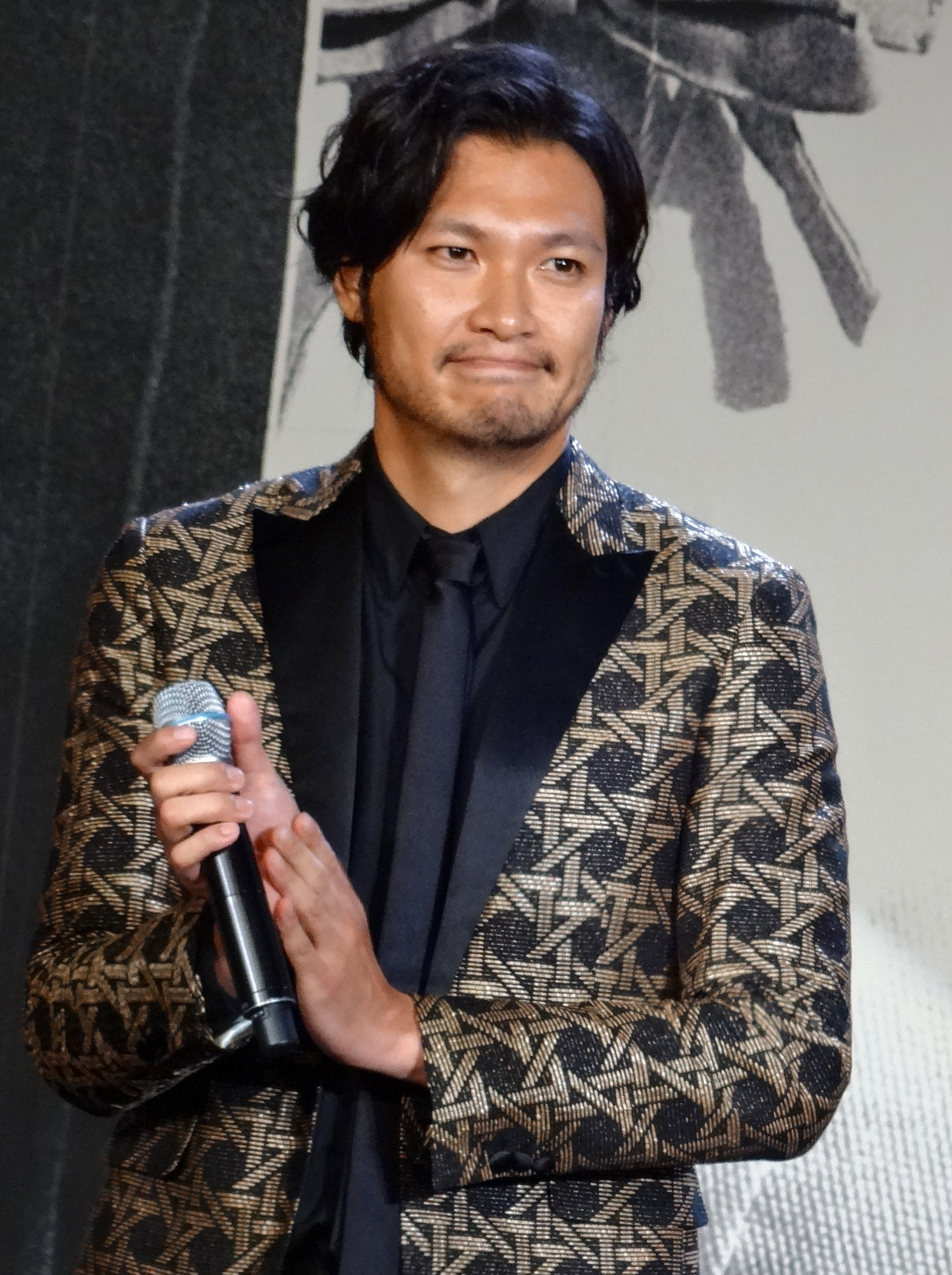
- Aoki at the Red Carpet Premiere of Rurouni Kenshin: Kyoto Inferno / The Legend Ends, on June 5, 2014
- Born: 14 March 1980 (age 46); Osaka, Japan
- Occupation: Actor
- Years active: 2002–present
- Agent: Stardust Promotion
- Spouse: Yūka (m. 2016)
- Children: 1

Munetaka Aoki (青木 崇高, Aoki Munetaka; born March 14, 1980) is a Japanese actor. He played Sanosuke Sagara in the live action adaptation of the manga and anime series Rurouni Kenshin, and engineer Sōsaku Tachibana in Godzilla Minus One. He is married to Japanese actress and model Yūka.

== Filmography ==
=== Film ===
- Battle Royale II (2003), Jun Nanami
- Fly, Daddy, Fly (2005)
- Limit of Love: Umizaru (2006), Masaya Watanabe
- Hatsukoi (2006)
- Heavenly Forest Tada,2006)
- Tsubakiyama Kacho no Nanoka-kan (2006)
- Tokyo Rhapsody (2007)
- Season of Snow (2008)
- Oppai Volleyball (2009), Kazuki Jo
- Counterfeit (2009)
- Rise Up (2009)
- Time Traveller: The Girl Who Leapt Through Time(2010)
- Cannonball Wedlock(2011)
- My Back Page (2011), Christ
- Hara-Kiri: Death of a Samurai (2011), Hikokurō Omodaka
- Rurouni Kenshin (2012), Sanosuke Sagara
- Fly With The Gold (2012)
- Princess Sakura: Forbidden Pleasures (2013)
- Rurouni Kenshin: Kyoto Inferno (2014), Sanosuke Sagara
- Rurouni Kenshin: The Legend Ends (2014), Sanosuke Sagara
- S The Last Policeman - Recovery of Our Future (2015), Katsuichiro Kurata
- Twisted Justice (2016), Kuribayashi
- Snow Woman (2016)
- Silence (2016), Prison Guard #1
- My Friend "A" (2018)
- Mori, The Artist's Habitat (2018)
- Our Departures (2018)
- It Comes (2018), Kotoko Higa
- Samurai Marathon (2019), Yoshikuni Ueki
- True Mothers (2020), Debt collector
- Ora, Ora Be Goin' Alone (2020)
- Independence of Japan (2020)
- Rurouni Kenshin: The Final (2021), Sanosuke Sagara
- Hokusai (2021), Takai Kōzan
- Kawa no Nagare ni (2021)
- 99.9 Criminal Lawyer: The Movie (2021), Takahisa Marukawa
- Yamabuki (2022)
- The Roundup: No Way Out (2023), Ricky
- Godzilla Minus One (2023), Sōsaku Tachibana
- Missing (2024), Yutaka
- Serpent's Path (2024), Sōichirō
- Ghost Cat Anzu (2024), Tetsuya (voice)
- Scarlet (2025), Rosencrantz (voice)
- The Samurai and the Prisoner (2026), Araki Kyuzaemon

=== TV drama series ===
- Ryōmaden (2010), Gotō Shōjirō
- Taira no Kiyomori (2012), Benkei
- Pretty Proofreader (2016), Hachirō Kaizuka
- Segodon (2018), Shimazu Hisamitsu
- North Light (2020)
- The 13 Lords of the Shogun (2022), Kiso Yoshinaka
- Futari no Ultraman (2022), Hajime Tsuburaya
- The Decagon House Murders (2024), Shimada Kiyoshi
- Like a Dragon: Yakuza (2024), Goro Majima
- 1972: Nagisa no Keika (2025), Seitoku Yonaha
- Human Vapor (2026), Shin'ya Okamoto
- The Shogunate Rebel (2027), Kurimoto Jō'un
