= Rurouni Kenshin: The Beginning =

2021 Japanese film

- Theatrical release poster

Japanese name
- Kanji: るろうに剣心 最終章 The Beginning
Transcriptions
- Revised Hepburn: Rurouni Kenshin Saishūshō Za Biginingu
- Directed by: Keishi Ōtomo
- Screenplay by: Keishi Ōtomo
- Based on: Rurouni Kenshin by Nobuhiro Watsuki
- Produced by: Hiroyoshi Koiwai; Satoshi Fukushima
- Starring: Takeru Satoh; Kasumi Arimura; Issey Takahashi; Nijirō Murakami; Masanobu Ando; Kazuki Kitamura; Yōsuke Eguchi
- Cinematography: Takuro Ishizaka
- Edited by: Tsuyoshi Imai
- Music by: Naoki Satō
- Production companies: Warner Bros. Pictures Japan: Amuse; Shueisha; KDDI; GyaO!
- Distributed by: Warner Bros. Pictures (Japan); Netflix (International)
- Release date: June 4, 2021 (Japan)
- Running time: 137 minutes
- Country: Japan
- Language: Japanese
- Box office: $21.3 million

Rurouni Kenshin: The Beginning (Japanese: るろうに剣心 最終章 The Beginning, Hepburn: Rurouni Kenshin Saishūshō Za Biginingu) is a 2021 Japanese jidaigeki action film based on the manga series Rurouni Kenshin by Nobuhiro Watsuki. Written and directed by Keishi Ōtomo, it is the fifth and final installment of the Rurouni Kenshin film series and serves as a prequel, depicting Himura Kenshin's origins as the assassin "Hitokiri Battōsai", while exploring his relationship with the woman named Yukishiro Tomoe.

Rurouni Kenshin: The Beginning was released on June 4, 2021, by Warner Bros. Pictures Japan. The film was produced simultaneously with Rurouni Kenshin: The Final, which was released two months prior, and features elements that tie into each other.

== Plot ==
Himura Kenshin, also called Hitokiri Battōsai, is a political assassin who is part of the revolution that is poised to overthrow the Tokugawa shogunate during the Bakumatsu in Kyoto. He joins the Chōshū clan and soon works for their leader, Katsura Kogorō, as an assassin alongside Iizuka, the examiner of executions. During one of the assassinations, a member of the Kyoto Watch wounds Himura in his last moments, much to Himura's confusion. One evening, as Himura is out having a drink, he steps in to intervene with supposed members of the revolution who demand to be treated as heroes by a woman named Yukishiro Tomoe. Himura is then attacked by an unknown assassin but manages to slay him. In the aftermath, Himura finds Tomoe watching him and takes her back to his hideout, an inn for Chōshū revolutionaries. The next morning, Tomoe decides to stay and work at the inn. Kenshin is stunned, particularly when she questions and twists his philosophy on who he chooses to kill.

When Katsura is informed of Himura's new relationship, he questions Tomoe's impact on him. During the Ikedaya incident (1864), an armed encounter between the Ishin Shishi which includes masterless samurai formally employed by the Chōshū and Tosa clans, and the Shinsengumi, the Bakufu's special police force at the Ikedaya Inn in Shijō Kawaramachi, Kyoto, Himura rushes to the site to protect the Chōshū and rescue Katsura but is delayed by the Shinsengumi captain Okita Sōji. Himura and the Chōshū clan are forced to withdraw from the area. Before Katsura goes into hiding, he arranges for Kenshin and Tomoe to hide in the village of Ōtsu, outside Kyoto, asking Tomoe to look after Himura and pretend to act as husband and wife so that Himura will not be suspected.

During their time in the village, Himura learns how to be a farmer and starts to understand the meaning of peace and happiness. One day, when Himura is out, Tomoe's brother, Enishi, comes to meet his sister, revealing both as spies working for the Yaminobu who are pro-shogunate and have been planning to entrap and kill Battōsai the whole time. Tomoe refuses to continue working with them and asks Enishi to return home to Edo, causing Enishi to run off in anger. When Himura returns, he learns from Tomoe that she was previously engaged to be married; however, her fiancé was assassinated before the wedding. Himura consoles her and tells her that she has done enough and that she should no longer carry the pain. As they bond as husband and wife, Himura promises her that he will find a way to stop killing in the new age and that he will protect her happiness.

The next day, Tomoe meets with the leader of the Yaminobu, but learns she has been used as a pawn to weaken Himura. Himura goes to the Yaminobu to rescue her. As intended by the Yaminobu, Himura is visibly distressed and distracted, having found out that Tomoe's fiancé is the member of the Kyoto Watch he had assassinated. Despite his emotional state, he is skillful enough to instinctively fight and defend himself. Upon reaching the leader, Tatsumi, Himura has reached his limit and can temporarily neither see (blinded by exploding sulphur) nor hear. As Tatsumi is about to kill Himura, Tomoe intervenes by restraining Tatsumi. Unaware that Tomoe is right in front of him, Himura deals a death blow, killing Tatsumi as well as fatally wounding Tomoe. Taking her last breath, Tomoe carves another scar on Himura's cheek with her dagger, thus completing a cross-shaped scar that her fiancé had started, whilst apologizing to him for the pain she has caused.

Shortly after, Katsura visits Himura at the village house to inform him that they found out Iizuka was also a spy. However, he still needs Himura to join them on the battlefield. However, Himura declares that once the new age arrives, he will never kill again. Himura finishes reading Tomoe's diary which explains how she changed from seeking revenge for her fiancé to falling in love with her fiancé's killer and finally resolving to do all she can to preserve him. The film ends with the Battle of Toba–Fushimi (1868) where the Chōshū are victorious over their rivals. With the Bakumatsu finished, despite being challenged to a last sword fight by Saitō Hajime, Himura abandons his sword as he leaves the battlefield. The narrative tells us that Battōsai disappears for the next 10 years on an unknown journey as Japan enters the Meiji era.

== Cast ==
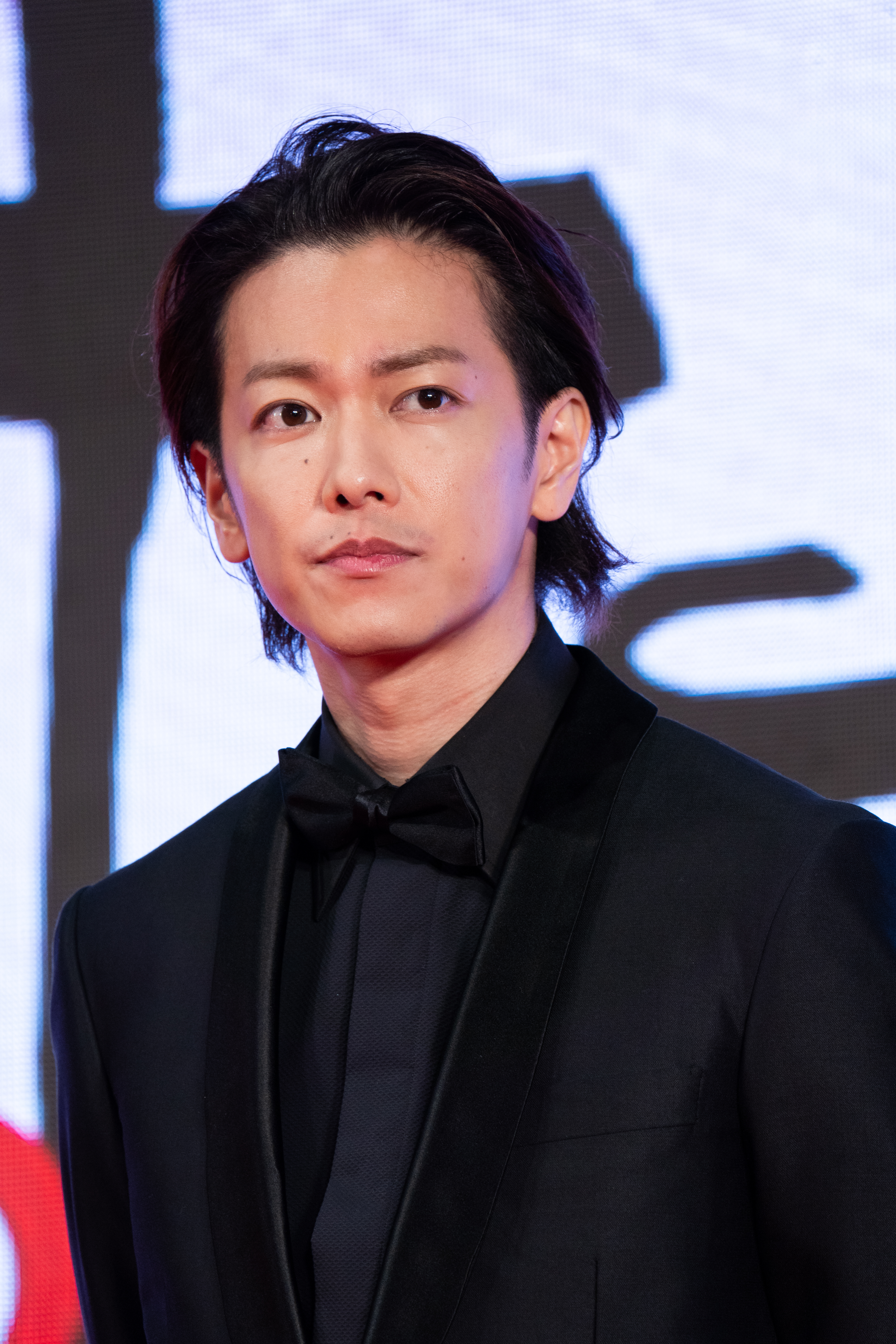
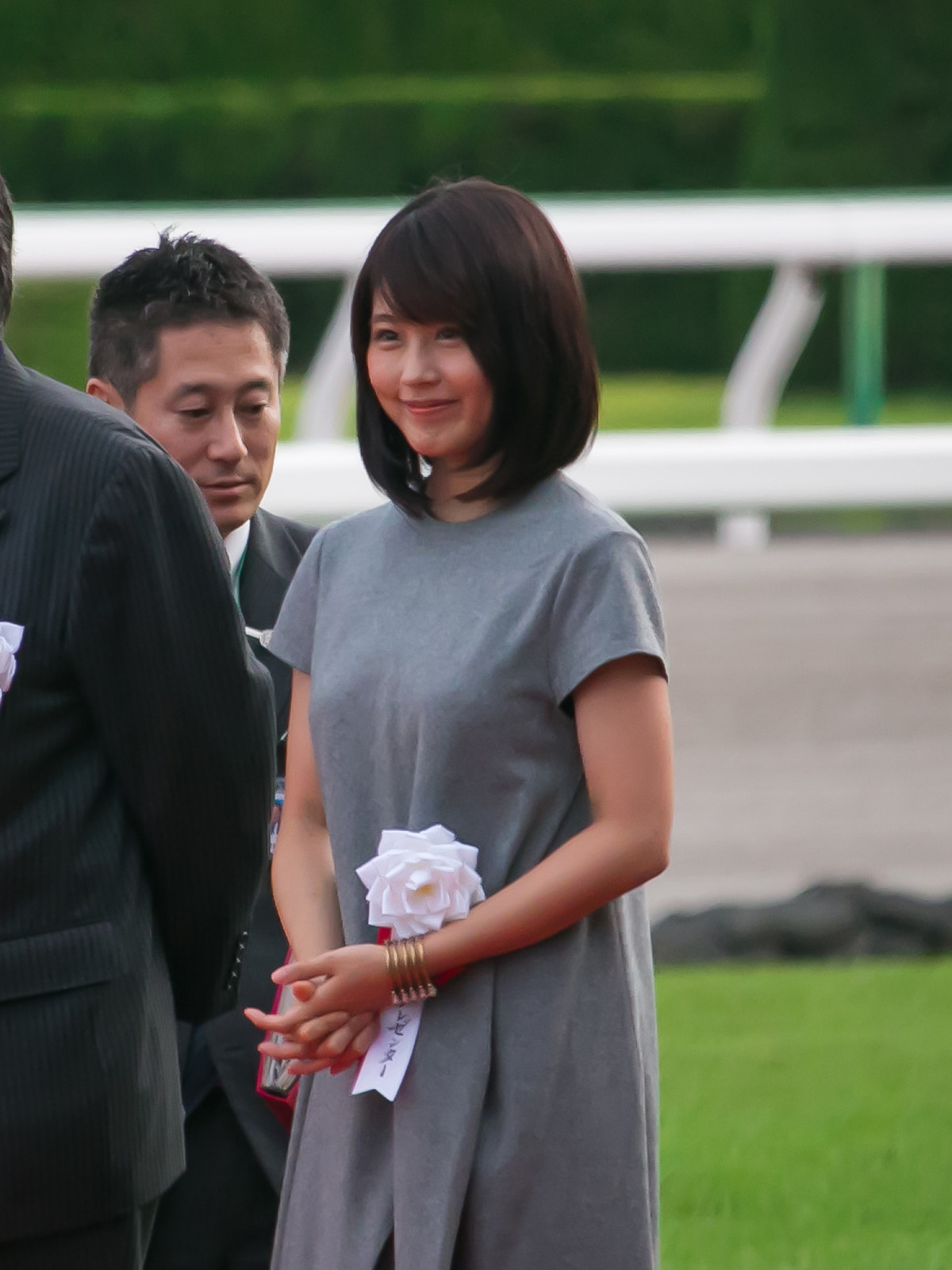
Takeru Satoh (left) and Kasumi Arimura, who portray Kenshin and Tomoe, respectively.
- Takeru Satoh as Himura Kenshin
- Kasumi Arimura as Yukishiro Tomoe
- Issey Takahashi as Katsura Kogorō
- Yōsuke Eguchi as Saitō Hajime
- Nijirō Murakami as Okita Sōji
- Kazuki Kitamura as Tatsumi
- Masanobu Ando as Takasugi Shinsaku
- Towa Araki as Yukishiro Enishi
- Shima Ōnishi as Iizuka
- Takahiro Fujimoto as Kondō Isami
- Sōkō Wada as Hijikata Toshizō
- Mansaku Ikeuchi as Katagai
- Mayu Hotta as Ikumatsu
- Makiko Watanabe as a landlady
- Wataru Ichinose as Sumita
- Kinari Hirano as Nakajō
- Eita Okuno as Murakami
- Eiki Narita as Yatsume Mumyōi
- Masataka Kubota as Akira Kiyosato

== Production ==
This fifth entry was produced at the same period of time as the fourth entry. The film started shooting on November 4, 2018, and finished on June 28, 2019. Large-scale shooting for more than 7 months was carried out at 43 locations nationwide, including Kyoto, Nara, Shiga, Mie, Hyogo, Kumamoto, Hiroshima, Tochigi, Saitama, Shizuoka, Osaka, and Nagano. It used a total of 6,000 extras. Director Ōtomo explained: "The goal for me was to portray the humanity and drama of the characters within the fight scenes and action. "The action sequences weren't just action, but rather an important factor in portraying the characters. That is why the main cast, including Takeru, performed almost all of the action sequences without stunt doubles." He added: "I always take acting scenes in one sequence without cuts, and the action scenes in this film were basically shot with the same approach." The director added that while it might be "difficult" for his cast to do the stunts themselves he felt it made the action scenes "more emotional" as a result.

Takeru Satoh has portrayed the character of Kenshin Himura since 2012, and has been doing all his own stunts since he first took on the role. Kenshin is an expert in "Hiten Mitsurugi-ryu," a sword technique that allows the fighter to attack multiple assailants at once. And, keeping in line with the source material, Satoh is regularly put up against multiple actors that he has to fend off through a series of intricately detailed moves in all five films. Embodying his samurai character, Satoh reportedly spent weeks perfecting the sword fights with choreographers, going through the moves multiple times both in and out of costume in a studio before heading out on set. Kasumi Arimura expressed pressure about her work due to the expectations given to her further appearances in The Beginning as she only appeared in flashbacks in the previous movie as well as how different it is. In retrospect, she found it an interesting experience even if her role was smaller than other fellow actors. Among her favorite experiences involve her daily life with Kenshin as a married couple as the two work with a camp filled with plants.

The theme song "Broken Heart of Gold" is performed by One Ok Rock.

== Release ==
Rurouni Kenshin: The Beginning was released in Japanese theatres on June 4, 2021. All five films in the Rurouni Kenshin series were screened on the 24th Shanghai International Film Festival (SIFF), which was held on June 11–20. Rurouni Kenshin was the first Japanese live action series invited to be screened in Movie Franchise Section in Shanghai International Film Festival, which was newly established in 2016, while only Hollywood blockbuster franchises have been invited before. This was also the international premiere of The Final and The Beginning. The Beginning was released on Netflix globally on July 30.

In Japan, the film was released on digital platforms on October 20, and on Blu-ray and DVD on November 10.

== Reception ==
Rurouni Kenshin: The Beginning opened in the first place at the Japanese box office, selling 350,000 tickets for over 508 million yen (about US$4.7 million) in its opening weekend. Rurouni Kenshin: The Final ranked at #2 that weekend, making Rurouni Kenshin the first franchise to take the top two spots at the Japanese box office in the same weekend. In total, the film has grossed $21,318,560 at the Japanese box office.

Anime News Network acclaimed the acting of the lead actors as well as the handling of fights, stating that the film should be watched before The Final due to spoilers. LeisureByte commented that while Kenshin's character is too stoic in this movie, he becomes a more complex character when exploring his work and romance. However, the length of the film was a subject of criticism as newcomers might be bored by the pacing. Asian Movie Pulse praised the darker take on Kenshin's character due to the way he works as an assassin but noted his romance with Tomoe made the plot more interesting which is made more impactful thanks to the acting of Satoh and Arimura. Aniradioplus praised the fight sequences for being surprisingly violent in contrast to previous films as it might shock returning viewers to see Kenshin's coldblooded actions and the amount of gore caused by them. Fiction Horizon found it as fitting finale to live-action series due to the handling of Kenshin's nature and how he changes across the narrative.

ButWhyTho gave it a perfect score, recommending it to every fan for balanced portrayal of Himura, his relationship with Tomoe and the cinematography. Psychocinematography found the handling of action scenes well executed and how different it is from previous works due to how Kenshin embraces violence in his fights to kill enemies due to his job of his assassin rather than being portrayed as a pacifist wanderer. The film was also praised by Dylan Griffin from The Young Folks for the darker portrayal of Kenshin and how his life with Tomoe and eventual tragedy leads to his transformation into the character he highly recognized. The realism given to the protagonist's was also credited to the liberties the director's staff take as the film is enrichened by the realism the original series is already known for. In retrospect, TheBiggestinJapan also said that Kenshin is portrayed as a more realistic fighter in The Beginning rather than his supernatural portrayal is he more known to the point it feels set in another world though the film The Final had already spoiled the ending of The Beginning to the audience should they watch the movies in the order they were released.

== See also ==
- Rurouni Kenshin: Trust & Betrayal (1999), an original video animation (OVA) adaptation of the same storyline.
