= Rurouni Kenshin: The Final =

2021 Japanese film

- Theatrical release poster

Japanese name
- Kanji: るろうに剣心 最終章 The Final
Transcriptions
- Revised Hepburn: Rurouni Kenshin: Saishūshō – Za Fainaru
- Directed by: Keishi Ōtomo
- Screenplay by: Keishi Ōtomo
- Based on: Rurouni Kenshin by Nobuhiro Watsuki
- Produced by: Hiroyoshi Koiwai; Satoshi Fukushima
- Starring: Takeru Satoh; Emi Takei; Mackenyu Arata; Yusuke Iseya; Munetaka Aoki; Yū Aoi; Tao Tsuchiya; Ryunosuke Kamiki; Yōsuke Eguchi; Kasumi Arimura
- Cinematography: Takuro Ishizaka
- Edited by: Tsuyoshi Imai
- Music by: Naoki Satō
- Production companies: Warner Bros. Pictures Japan; Amuse; Shueisha; KDDI; GyaO!
- Distributed by: Warner Bros. Pictures (Japan); Netflix (International)
- Release date: April 23, 2021 (Japan)
- Running time: 138 minutes
- Country: Japan
- Language: Japanese
- Box office: $37 million

Rurouni Kenshin: The Final (Japanese: るろうに剣心 最終章 The Final, Hepburn: Rurouni Kenshin Saishūshō Za Fainaru) is a 2021 Japanese jidaigeki action film based on the Rurouni Kenshin manga series by Nobuhiro Watsuki, and serving as the fourth installment of the Rurouni Kenshin film series following Rurouni Kenshin: The Legend Ends (2014). The film adapts the manga series' final arc, though some story elements differ. Like the previous entries, it was directed and written by Keishi Ōtomo, with Takeru Satoh reprising his role as Himura Kenshin. The film's story focuses on the arrival of Yukishiro Enishi as he seeks revenge against Kenshin for the death of his sister Yukishiro Tomoe, which leads to a confrontation between the two.

Rurouni Kenshin: The Final was released in Japan on April 23, 2021, by Warner Bros. Pictures Japan, and released later internationally on Netflix. It received positive reviews from critics. The film was produced simultaneously alongside the film series' fifth and final installment Rurouni Kenshin: The Beginning, a prequel whose footage is used in flashback scenes in The Final, which released two months later.

== Plot ==
The leader of the Shanghai mafia, Yukishiro Enishi, arrives in Tokyo to search for the former government assassin Himura Kenshin. He and his allies, who all have a grudge with Kenshin, begin their assault on the city. They first fire a cannon at the Akabeko restaurant, resulting in multiple casualties. Kenshin discovers a note with the written characters jinchū (人誅, lit. "human judgment"). Enishi sends one of his allies to destroy the Maekawa Dojo, and another to the Chief of Police' home. Sagara Sanosuke heads to the Maekawa Dojo whilst Kenshin checks on the Chief and defeats Enishi's ally. On his way back, he is confronted by Enishi, who states that his goal is for Kenshin to suffer the pain he felt when Kenshin killed his sister, Yukishiro Tomoe.

Kenshin reveals to Kamiya Kaoru, Sanosuke, Myōjin Yahiko and Takani Megumi that fifteen years ago when he worked for the Imperialists, he fell in love with Tomoe, who, unbeknownst to him, was a spy for the Shogunate. Her original intention was to kill Kenshin to avenge Akira Kiyosato, her late fiancé and the one who gave Kenshin his first scar before being killed by him. However, the two fell in love and got married. When the assassins whom she allied with tried to ambush Kenshin, Tomoe blocked them and was accidentally killed by Kenshin himself. Before her last breath, she was holding a knife as she caressed Kenshin's cheek, and gave him his second scar, resulting in cross-shaped scars on his cheek.

Oniwabanshu members Shinomori Aoshi and Makimachi Misao arrive to assist Kenshin, bringing Tomoe's diary. Saitō and his troops are sent to a trap set by Sawagejō Chō, revealed to be working with the mafia. Enishi's troops begin bombing various areas of Tokyo. During the attacks, Shinomori is wounded while Kenshin defeats the man responsible for the Akabeko restaurant attack. Meanwhile, Enishi beats up Sanosuke and kidnaps Kaoru. However, he is unable to kill her, as she reminds him of his sister and his trauma.

Kenshin prepares to face Enishi and redeem himself for Tomoe's death. As he struggles in his fight against the mafia, Misao and Saitō appear with the police to help him. In Enishi's mansion, Kenshin encounters Wu Heishin and his guards. His former enemy Seta Sōjirō appears, revealing that from Kenshin's words, he was able to move on from his past. He helps Kenshin, enabling him to move forward to find Enishi. The two battle until Kenshin lets Enishi stab him, apologizing to his broken rival. Heishin shoots Kenshin but Kaoru intervenes. Enishi protects her, taking a bullet, and beats Heishin until Kenshin stops him, thanking him for protecting Kaoru.

In the aftermath, Enishi is arrested. Kaoru sends him Tomoe's diary; upon reading it, he breaks down, finally understanding his sister's final resolve: to stop Kenshin from killing at the cost of her own life. Kenshin and Kaoru visit Tomoe's grave, where Kenshin thanks Tomoe, apologizes, and says goodbye to her, ready to move on in his life.

== Cast ==
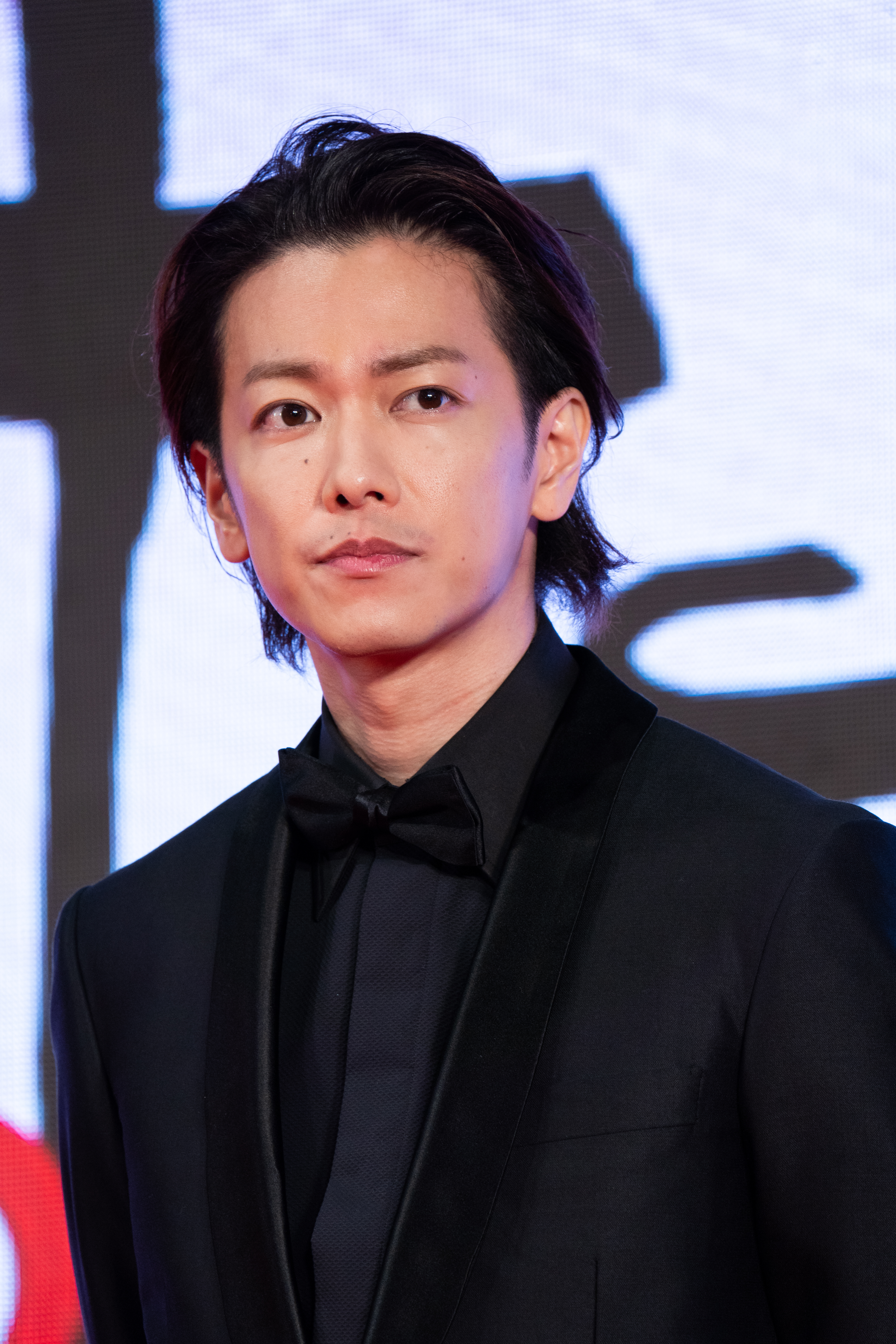
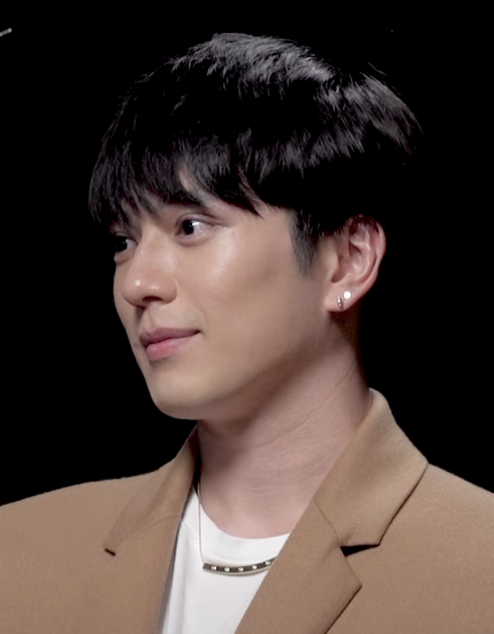
Takeru Satoh (left) and Mackenyu Arata (right), who portray Kenshin and Enishi, repeated their action scenes several times due to difficulties to adapt.

The live-action movie features the following actors:

- Takeru Satoh as Himura Kenshin
- Emi Takei as Kamiya Kaoru
- Mackenyu Arata as Yukishiro Enishi
- Kasumi Arimura as Yukishiro Tomoe
- Yōsuke Eguchi as Saitō Hajime
- Munetaka Aoki as Sagara Sanosuke
- Yū Aoi as Takani Megumi
- Yusuke Iseya as Shinomori Aoshi
- Riku Ōnishi as Myōjin Yahiko
- Tao Tsuchiya as Makimachi Misao
- Ryōsuke Miura as Sawagejō Chō
- Takuma Otoo as Woo Heishin
- Shingo Tsurumi as Chief Uramura
- Takeo Nakahara as Maekawa Miyauchi
- Mantarō Koichi as Kawaji Toshiyoshi
- Shinnosuke Abe as Kujiranami Hyōgo
- Shuntaro Yanagi as Otowa Hyōko
- Joey Iwanaga as Inui Tenmon
- Eiki Narita as Yatsume Mumyōi
- Ryūnosuke Kamiki as Seta Sōjirō

With the exception of Kaito Ōyagi (Yahiko), all previous characters have the same actors from previous movies.

== Production ==
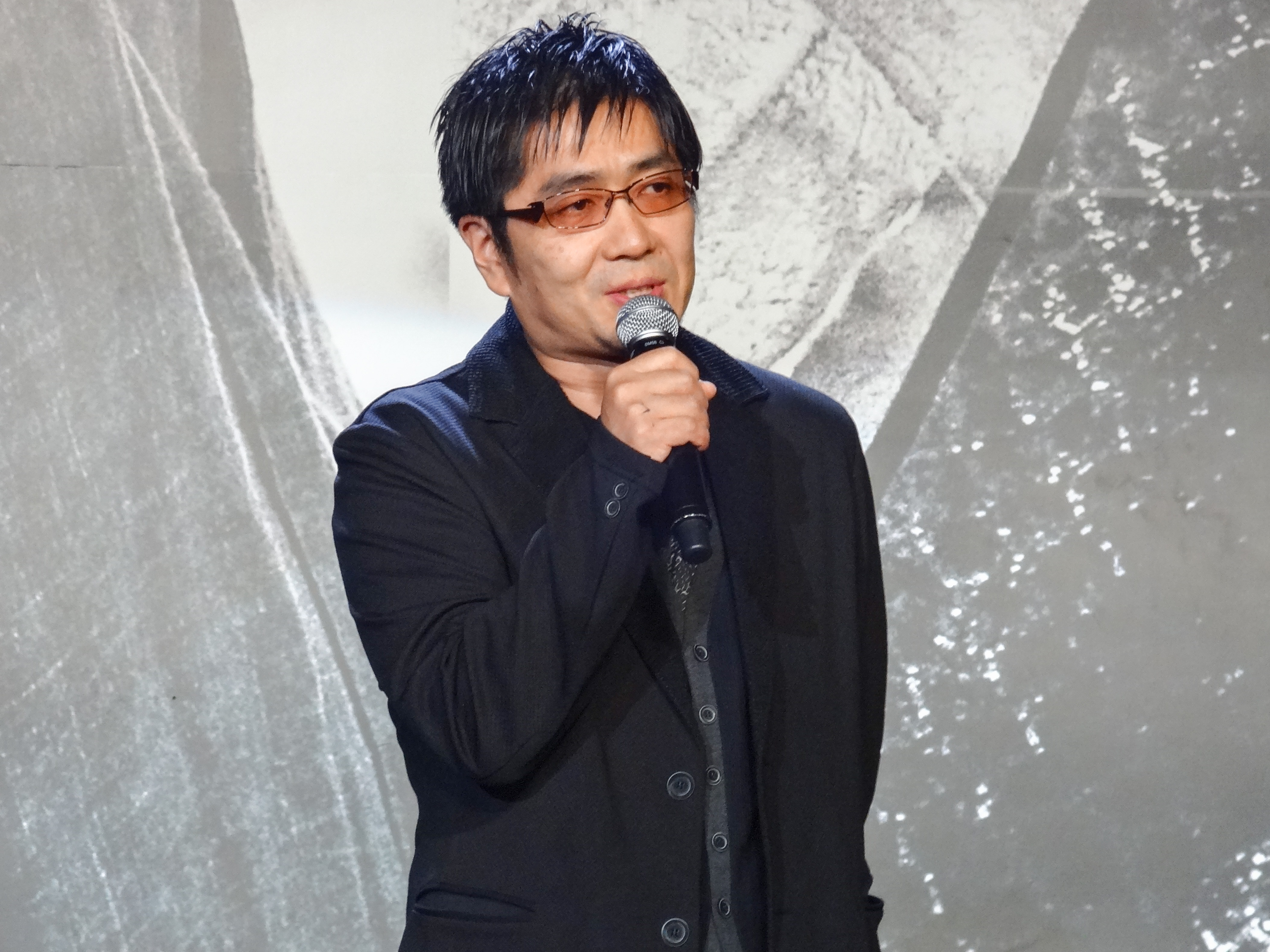
Director Keishi Ōtomo

Following the "Kyoto arc" duology films from the series, director Keishi Ōtomo noted there are also circumstances in which my own projects were progressing in various ways. So, first of all, they had the staff take the lead and proceed. Ōtomo started around the spring of 2018. He may have had to enter for a while. The script was quite difficult according to the director. In order to do that, I thought that in The Final, he had to draw Yukishiro Tomoe firmly. On the other hand, in this The Final, a doll that resembles Kaoru appears. He added it makes Kaoru think she is dead and pushes Kenshin into despair. Ōtomo thinks that it can be expressed without problems if it is a manga, but it is very difficult when it comes to live-action video. When thinking about it, Ōtomo thought that Enishi and Kenshin would fight for a woman named Tomoe, and that feeling was very strong. For Kenshin, Tomoe is a destined person and the only woman he loves which raised the tragic relationship between Kenhsin and Enishi. With such a part as the axis, a series of transcendental actions. Ōtomo's writing the script while having the idea of "let's compete with action as much as possible". In contrast to The Beginning, The Final has a Japanese-Western eclectic feel in the Meiji era, so the places with that atmosphere are a little limited.

Although based on the Jinchu arc from Rurouni Kenshin, Takeru Satoh explained in December 2020 that the movie would be different from the source material. He stated that he was worried whether manga author Nobuhiro Watsuki would like the film since it contains an original story. However, Watsuki sent him a letter in response that he was able to feel fully immersed in the world of the film. Satoh was relieved to hear Watsuki's thoughts on the film. The main theme of The Final is how Kenshin will live in the future. Satoh stated it was important for the movie to settle the fight against the edge, in regard to Kenshin's redemption. He further claims the highlight is the way of life of Kenshin.

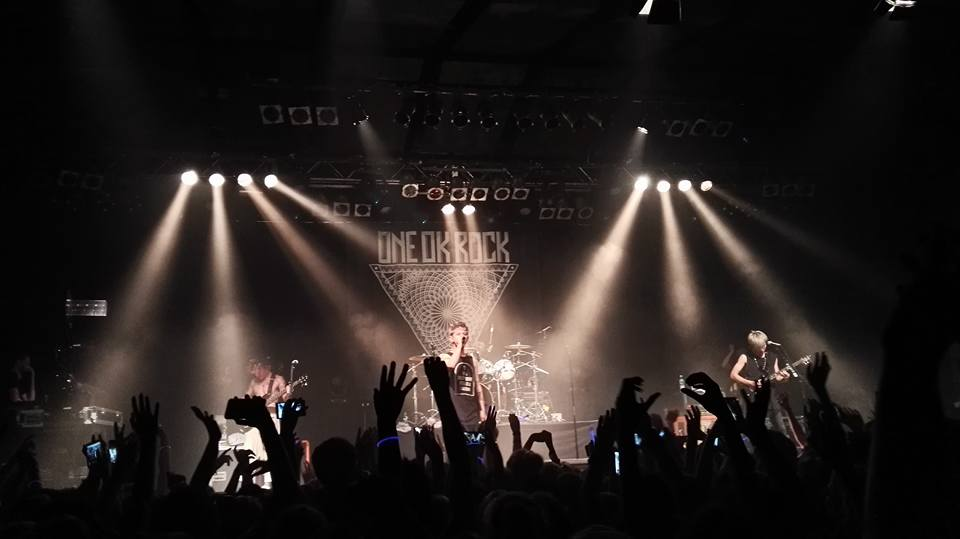
One Ok Rock performed the movie's main theme

Plans for another sequel had been revealed by Daily.co.jp on September 4, 2017, in connection the main actress Emi Takei's breach of contract due to her marriage with Exile band member Takahiro, as well as her pregnancy. Takei had agreements with up to 10 companies for commercials, including JTB and Yōfuku no Aoyama, and it was reported that her agreement with SSP might be terminated, with her commercial agreements with other companies being affected. Oscar Promotion, Takei's agency, apologized to its clients, and was negotiating penalties for breach of contract. The penalty for her breach of contract could have reached up to 1 billion yen (about US$9.11 million). The film was then planned to premiere in Japanese cinemas on July 3, 2020, but it was postponed to April 23, 2021, due to the recent COVID-19. Ōtomo commented the studio shut down after the government declared a state of emergency, so the entire production came to a halt. As a result, the staff could not do post-production work, prepare for the film's release, and other tasks. With the new release date, Ōtomo aims to raise the level of quality even more than before.

Rock band One Ok Rock provided the soundtrack song "Renegades" for the film. In an interview with J Rock News, Moriuchi would express how the song connects to being the main theme for The Final, in which he would say that "Renegades" relates more to the protagonist than the overarching plot of the film.

=== Filming ===
This fourth entry was produced at the same period of time with the fifth entry. The film started shooting on November 4, 2018, and finished on June 28, 2019. Large-scale shooting for more than 7 months was carried out at 43 locations nationwide, including Kyoto, Nara, Shiga, Mie, Hyogo, Kumamoto, Hiroshima, Tochigi, Saitama, Shizuoka, Osaka, and Nagano. It utilized a total of 6,000 extras. During shooting of the film, Satoh faced the major difficulty of doing scenes where Kenshin battles a large number of enemies by himself. There were several turns of the camera as these fights occurred in order to make the battles more appealing which made it more tiring than one on one battles but at the cost of becoming more tired. The final battle between Kenshin and Enishi had to be remade several times because Satoh got exhausted of moving four times in total. Satoh praised Arata's work as Enishi as he made the antagonist terrifying to the point the comical Kenshin acts with more tension in response to his threats which made him drop the signature sound effect "Oro". Arata also praised Satoh's works as he carried the franchise across several years in the live-action films.

Emi Takei took a diet to keep her body properly for Kaoru's character. Mackenyu, a fan of the Rurouni Kenshin installment, he could not hide his surprise when offered to play Enishi. Enishi is described as the series' most feared enemy. To match his physique, Mackenyu worked out, but he focused on his mentality. As an actor he really happy that he was able to be part of a set where he can fully showcase his abilities. While performing the action scenes with Tanigaki and his team, sometimes he suggested his own ideas for Enishi's movements. Other than the scenes with Kenshin, the scenes with Kaoru are a highlight. Mackenyu thinks the audience can see another side of Enishi. When they exchanged conversations, and his actions around her might show the character's depths as he revives his trauma of losing Tomoe. Regarding Rurouni Kenshin villains, he also wanted Enishi to look more menacing than the previous antagonist, Shishio Makoto. Ryūnosuke Kamiki returned to act as Seta Sōjirō which surprised the media in general because his character was not present in the original manga.

== Release ==
Rurouni Kenshin: The Final premiered theatrically in Japan on April 23, 2021, by Warner Bros. Pictures Japan. All five films in the Rurouni Kenshin series were screened on the 24th Shanghai International Film Festival (SIFF), which was held on June 11–20. Rurouni Kenshin was the first Japanese live action series invited to be screened in Movie Franchise Section in Shanghai International Film Festival, which was newly established in 2016, while only Hollywood blockbuster franchises have been invited before. This was also the international premiere of The Final and The Beginning. The Final was released on Netflix on June 18, which included an English dub.

In Japan, the film was released on digital platforms on September 22, and on Blu-ray and DVD on October 13.

== Reception ==
=== Box office ===
The work was released on 480 screens in 362 theaters nationwide from April 23, 2021. Due to the state of emergency, 63 buildings in Tokyo, Osaka, Hyogo, and Kyoto were closed from the 25th (64 in total from 26th and 67 in total from 27th). Despite that, the box office revenue of over 535 million yen (over 371,000 spectators) was recorded in the opening two days which became the No. 1 weekend opening box office in a live-action movie category released this year.

The film grossed 745 million yen (approximately US$6.9 million) the first three days of screening. In total, the film has grossed 4.34 billion yen (approximately US$37.8 million) at the Japanese box office.

=== Critical response ===
Critical response to The Final has generally positive. On the review aggregator website Rotten Tomatoes, 100% of 5 critics' reviews are positive, with an average rating of 9/10.

The Japan Times gave it three stars and a half with comments focused on its fight sequences and the conclusion it gives to Kenshin's arc during his life as a former assassin. Decider also enjoyed the fight sequences and acting though he felt that Sanosuke's weak side might come across an unintentional hilarious during the final act. Nevertheless, the inclusion of Seta Sōjirō was praised for Ryunosuke Kamiki's performance as the character became an aid to Kenshin and wants to see his resolution to his life as a pacifist while also enjoying the bigger focus on Misao and Saitō. The romance between Kenshin and Kaoru was criticized though as being underdeveloped and coming across as a surprise. Asian Movie Web felt the movie initially suffered from a slow pacing and that some characters have little roles in comparison to their previous works. Nevertheless, while there were changes in the script, the reviewer liked how Misao and Shinomori have more screen time and that the choreographer Kenji Tanigaki outdid himself in the making of the fights, most notably the ones involving Kenshin, Enishi and Sojiro. Fiction Horizon also noted while that there were several changes to the narrative, the essential themes focused on the manga were properly followed by the movie, most notably Kenshin's quest for redemption.

Several writers focused on Mackenyu's and Satoh's roles. Polygon as he claims that Mackenyu "brings tangible charisma to his screen persona" and how contrasting is his chaotic personality to the caring and relaxed Kenshin, giving further depths to the rivalry as they represented the chaos from the Meiji era. However, Anime News Network felt that Sanosuke and Enishi had little development when compared to their original manga personas. Fiction Horizon also noted Kenshin and Enishi's fight was well choreographed and served as a proper ending. Anime News Network liked the concept of Enishi's characterization due the new type of threat he brings to Kenshin not only due to his skills but whether or not the latter can bring him a solution to redeem himself for killing Tomoe during the events of Beginning. However, he lamented some cast members having minor roles in the narrative. Medium compared the threat provided to the Meiji era between Enishi and Shishio but felt that the latter was given a bigger threat to the peace in contrast to Enishi's schemes as it was more personal as a result of wanting revenge towards Kenshin. Kasumi Arimura and Mackenyu were also regarded by GamerFocus as the best actors in the movie due to how strong are their presence in the main character as well as their characterization. He praised the quality of the movie, regarding the original scenes as strong as the original narrative created by Watsuki and that Kenshin's character reached a proper ending after several films thanks to Satoh's performance.

Film School Rejects writer Rob Hunter listed the movie as the best action film of 2021.
