= List of Rurouni Kenshin characters =

Several of the main characters of Rurouni Kenshin, the faction of Shishio Makoto, and the Kyoto Oniwabanshū. Kenshin has the large picture at the top-right, and Shishio has the large picture at the bottom-left. The top row includes, from left to right, Shiro, Okon, Hiko, Kaoru, Saitō, and Sanosuke. The second row has Kuro, Omasu, Okina, Misao, Yahiko and Aoshi. The third row has, from left to right, Hōji, Yumi, Usui, Chō, Fuji, and Iwanbō. The bottom row has Sōjirō, Kamatari, Anji, Henya, and Saizuchi.

The manga series Rurouni Kenshin features a large cast of fictional characters created by Nobuhiro Watsuki. Set in Japan during the Meiji period, several of the characters are real historical figures who interact with the fictional characters.

The story begins in 1878 and follows a pacifist wanderer named Himura Kenshin, who was previously an assassin known as "Hitokiri Battōsai" working for the Ishin Shishi during the Bakumatsu period. After helping Kamiya Kaoru, the instructor of a kendo school in Tokyo, in defeating a criminal, he is invited by her to stay at her dojo. During his stay in Tokyo, Kenshin befriends new people including Myōjin Yahiko, a young child descendant from a samurai family who starts training under Kaoru, Sagara Sanosuke, a former Sekihō Army cadet who enjoys fighting, and Takani Megumi, a doctor involved with the illegal drug trade. He also encounters old and new enemies whose ambitions cause Kenshin to return to fighting, this time to protect the innocent.

== Protagonists ==
=== Himura Kenshin ===
Himura Kenshin (緋村 剣心) is a former legendary assassin known as "Hitokiri Battōsai" (人斬り抜刀斎) (Note: "Hitokiri". The term refers to an assassin and translates as "manslayer". Within the Rurouni Kenshin universe "Battōsai" refers to someone who has mastered battōjutsu.^{[ch. 13]} Assassins during the Bakumatsu adopted professional names; for instance Kawakami Gensai was known as Hitokiri Gensai.) (rendered as Battousai the Manslayer in the Media Blasters English anime dub, as Battousai: The Slasher in the Sony English dub.) At the end of the Bakumatsu, he becomes a wandering samurai, now wielding a sakabatō, a katana that has a structure in which the blade and ridge are struck in the opposite direction to a regular katana, so if it is used normally, it will always be in a ridged state and will have much less killing power. Kenshin wanders the country offering protection and aid to those in need as atonement for the killings he once committed as an assassin. He meets a young woman named Kamiya Kaoru in Tokyo, who invites him to live in her dojo despite learning about Kenshin's past. Throughout the series, Kenshin begins to establish relationships with many people, including ex-enemies, while dealing with his fair share of foes, new and old.

=== Kamiya Kaoru ===
Kamiya Kaoru (神谷 薫) is the instructor of a kendo school in Tokyo called Kamiya Kasshin-ryū. All of its students leave when many people are killed by someone claiming to be Hitokiri Battōsai and a practitioner of Kamiya Kasshin-ryū, damaging her school's reputation. The real Battōsai, now wandering pacifist Himura Kenshin, saves Kaoru from this murderous impostor. Kaoru invites Kenshin to stay at her dojo as she notes that he is a gentle person instead of a hitokiri. As the series continues, Kaoru develops strong romantic feelings for Kenshin, who is constantly haunted by his past deeds and believes he does not deserve happiness.

=== Myōjin Yahiko ===
Myōjin Yahiko (明神 弥彦) is an orphan from a samurai family who was forced to work as a pickpocket to repay the debt he had presumably owed, as his parents died before they could repay it. When Himura Kenshin rescues him, he decides to grow up to be just like Kenshin. But because of his strong beliefs, Kenshin will not teach the sword style he had learned. Therefore, Kenshin arranges for Yahiko to be trained in Kamiya Kasshin-ryū by Kamiya Kaoru. As the series progresses, Yahiko becomes skilled at swordsmanship and faces many opponents.

=== Sagara Sanosuke ===
Sagara Sanosuke (相楽 左之助) is a former member of the Sekihō Army. When the group was destroyed by the Meiji government, he became a fighter-for-hire to calm his anger by fighting. During his introduction in the series, he encounters the wanderer Himura Kenshin, who easily defeats him and can convince him to stop his mercenary work and instead start protecting people. Sanosuke becomes Kenshin's best friend and his partner in most of their fights.

=== Takani Megumi ===
Voiced by: Mika Doi (1996 series, Reflection), Saori Ōnishi (2023 series) (Japanese); Mari Devon (1996 series), Rebeca Robinson (Reflection), Jennifer Sun Bell (2023 series) (English)

Takani Megumi (高荷 恵) comes from a famous family of physicians from the Aizu region.^{[ch. 19]} She became the assistant to a Tokyo physician who had created a deadly new form of opium. When the doctor was killed, she was forced to make the new opium for corrupt industrialist Takeda Kanryū for the past three years.^{[ch. 19]} After being freed and stopped from committing suicide by Kenshin and Sanosuke, she becomes a doctor to atone for her past misdeeds.^{[ch. 29]} She has a wicked sense of humor and enjoys flirting with Kenshin to make Kaoru jealous (both Kaoru and Sanosuke refer to her as a "vixen" and in the manga vixen ears appear whenever she indulges in her sense of humor), but helps Kaoru come to terms with her feelings towards Kenshin. She is loyal to her friends and is always there to heal their wounds, especially Sanosuke, whom she often cautions about fighting. At the end of the series, she leaves Tokyo to open a clinic in Aizu.^{[ch. 252]}

Nobuhiro Watsuki created Megumi as a "mature woman" but had no specific model in mind. In the first Rurouni: Meiji Swordsman Romantic Story one-shot, Megumi, Kaoru, and Yahiko were siblings. Despite this version and her final version in the main series being so different, Watsuki said they have the same spirit and are not so unalike. Although he admitted the one-shot's version of Megumi had a "lighter quality" because of her small role, he, therefore, gave her a more "earthy quality" in the main serial so she could make an impression. By the time of the publication of Rurouni Kenshin volume four, Watsuki felt disappointed as she did not turn out nearly the way he wanted. However, because she is entertaining to draw and is the only woman Kaoru can interact with, he planned to have Megumi frequently appear as a secondary character. Watsuki's used the young grandmother from Takeshi Obata's Cyborg Jii-chan G as the design model for Megumi. Her story arc has "redemption for her crimes" as its theme, and the author wanted to express Kenshin's determination through Megumi. Megumi came in fourteenth place in the series' second character popularity poll, and fifteenth in the third. She is portrayed by Yū Aoi in the live-action films.

=== Shinomori Aoshi ===
Shinomori Aoshi (四乃森 蒼紫) is the Okashira or leader of the Oniwabanshū, and a skilled swordsman who his comrades highly respect. After he is defeated by Himura Kenshin and his comrades are killed, he becomes obsessed with killing Kenshin to earn the title of "the strongest" for the pride of the Oniwabanshū. He raised Makimachi Misao, the granddaughter of the previous Okashira, under his protection as a member of the Oniwabanshū.

=== Saitō Hajime ===
Saitō Hajime (斎藤 一), based on the historical figure of the same name, was the leader of the third squad of the Shinsengumi during the Bakumatsu. He has a long-standing rivalry with Kenshin and firmly believes in "Swift Death to Evil." He goes by the name of Fujita Gorō (藤田 五郎) and works as a Meiji police officer.

=== Makimachi Misao ===
Makimachi Misao (巻町 操) is a young kunoichi from Kyoto who was raised by the Oniwabanshū. She traveled to Tokyo searching for Shinomori Aoshi whom she is in love with. She wishes to learn what happened to Aoshi and his comrades and follows Kenshin to Kyoto, hoping to meet him again.^{[ch. 64]} When she learns of how Aoshi has become evil and obsessed with revenge, she decides to take over his title as "Okashira" and tries to forget him, but she can not. Kenshin promises that he will bring Aoshi back to her again.

=== Hasegawa Ashitarō ===
Hasegawa Ashitarō (長谷川明日郎) is an orphaned 16-year-old boy just released from prison during the Hokkaido Arc prologue. He and Inoue were inspired by buddy films with Watsuki remembering the ideal designs needed for the protagonists to be likable citing Ushio & Tora as an example. The first chapter had little hints about Ashitaro being related to Rurouni Kenshin with the second one expanding it more. Since the young character Myojin Yahiko already matured in the original Rurouni Kenshin, Watsuki created Ashitaro in order to have him act more like him during early years. Born in Niigata Prefecture, he survived by stealing crops and foraging the mountains. Although claiming to have served five years in a Tokyo prison for dine and dash, it is suspected to have been for being a gofer member of Shishio Makoto's faction, which planned to take over Japan before disbanding when their leader died five years ago. He possesses Shishio's sword, Mugenjin, but due to his propensity for entering uncontrolled fits of rage, Kenshin asks him not to draw it. Ashitaro's given name was formerly written as 悪太郎 ("evil child"), before he changed it to 明日郎 ("tomorrow's child").

=== Inoue Aran ===
Inoue Aran (井上阿爛) is a 16-year-old boy who grew up in the Westernized portion of Japan. He was jailed in Tokyo for three months for attempting to be a stowaway on a ship to the Americas. He is revealed to be half-Japanese with blond hair and suspected to be the son of a prostitute to foreigners. While travelling with Kenshin's group to Hakodate, he forms a friendly relationship with Takeda Kanryū based on their similar interests with business. Like Ashitarō, Aran was inspired by Ushio & Tora to be an appealing duo.

=== Kubota Asahi ===
Kubota Asahi (久保田旭) is a war orphan raised by the Yaminobu but claims to be a pacifist. Following their failure to kill Kenshin during the Bakumatsu, the Yaminobu lost status and were reduced to working as mercenaries for hire. Kubota was hired to Shishio's faction and later trailed Ashitaro to retrieve Shishio's sword. Despite her fear of Kenshin after learning that he killed his Yukishiro Tomoe in during the Bakumatsu, she is surprised to find well-meaning the former hitokiri has become and decides to assist him in his journey to Hakodate and find Kaoru's father.

== Antagonists ==
=== Hiruma Brothers ===
Voiced by: Tetsuo Komura (1996 series), Wataru Takagi (2023 series) (Japanese); Beau Billingslea (1996 series; Media Blasters dub), Richard Epcar (1996 series; Sony Samurai X dub), Jason Marnocha (2023 series) (English) (Gohei)
Voiced by: Chō (2023 series) (Japanese); Frank Todaro (English) (Kihei)

The Hiruma Brothers (比留間 兄弟, Hiruma Kyōdai) are crooks who scheme to take ownership of Kaoru's dojo. After Kaoru's father died, the elder brother Kihei (喜兵衛) collapsed in front of the dojo, and Kaoru took him in, becoming a kind of a live-in apprentice and gaining Kaoru's trust while trying to persuade her to sell the dojo.^{[ch. 1]} Gohei (伍兵衛), the younger brother, is a former samurai who falsely uses the "Hitokiri Battōsai" and Kamiya Kasshin-ryū names to commit murders. The brothers use the Kiheikan (鬼兵館), a former dojo in a neighboring town that has become a gathering spot for gamblers and rogues, as their base of operations.^{[ch. 1]} When Kaoru begins to discover the truth, the brothers attempt to kill her, but Kenshin easily defeats them after revealing himself to be the real Hitokiri Battōsai.^{[ch. 1]} Having escaped jail, the Hiruma Brothers appear again, hiring Sanosuke to fight Kenshin and planning to use a gun to kill a weakened Kenshin.^{[ch. 5]} When Kenshin defeats Sanosuke, he stops Kihei's bullet dead on the guard of his sword. When the brothers try to attack Kaoru and Yahiko, Sanosuke defeats Gohei and Kenshin injures Kihei into submission.^{[ch. 7]} Later in the series, they are employed as bodyguards by Fudōsawa, a yakuza in Sanosuke's hometown, and then by Tani Jūsanrō. Sanosuke easily beats them up on both occasions.^{[ch. 228, 234]}

Gohei is the only brother to appear in the first anime series and is more intelligent than his manga counterpart. He is a former student at the Kamiya dojo. Still, when Gohei insisted on using swords for killing and then unsuccessfully attacked the master of the dojo, Kaoru's father, he received a broken thumb and an expulsion. Gohei tries to take over the Kamiya dojo in the story, but Kenshin prevents him from doing so. Gohei hires Sanosuke to defeat Kenshin, but this fails. Later, he hires the Kisaki brothers to defeat Kenshin. Though they almost succeed, the brothers are beaten and Yahiko sends Gohei limping away after kicking him in the genitals.

Watsuki described the creation of the brothers as a "direct function of the story." Watsuki wanted "interesting villains to start things off with a bang" and made one "brainy" and the other "wild." He decided that the story involving the two coming together was taking "too many" pages, so he made the duo as brothers instead of being "circumstantially related." He used a manager and director from Takeshi Obata's Chikarabito Densetsu sumo manga as a model for Kihei and a character he found in a magazine that made him think "Ooh, impact!" for Gohei. Watsuki stated that, unlike the faces of Kenshin and other characters, the faces of Kihei and Gohei are of basic shapes and therefore the two were easy to draw as a result. He said that he became fonder of the brothers as his deadlines approached.

=== Udō Jin-e ===
Voiced by: Akio Otsuka (1996 series, Reflection), Tomokazu Sugita (2023 series) (Japanese); Dave Mallow (1996 series), Yong Yea (2023 series) (English)

Udō Jin-e (鵜堂 刃衛, Udō Jin'e), also known as "Kurogasa" (黒笠; "Black Hat"), is a deranged serial killer who has been hunting down former Ishin Shishi warriors that now hold positions in the government or economy for the past ten years.^{[ch. 9]} A master of the Nikaidō Heihō (二階堂平法) style, Jin-e was a member of the Shinsengumi during the Bakumatsu. But when he was about to be disciplined for killing people he was not supposed to, he escaped and switched sides to the Ishin Shishi and became a hitokiri for hire in Kyoto.^{[ch. 10, 11]} He now appears as a man dressed in a long kimono with a long scarf and straw hat. He has a unique technique to project chi toward people, hypnotizing them with his eyes via the Shin no Ippō (心の一方; "One Side of the Soul").^{[ch. 10]} When Kenshin stops him from killing Tani Jūsanrō, Jin-e makes Kenshin his next target.^{[ch. 10]} Believing the new repenting Kenshin to be soft and weak, Jin-e kidnaps Kaoru Kamiya to enrage Kenshin into his old Hitokiri Battōsai self.^{[ch. 12]} Though he assumes his old mindset and crushes Jin-e's right elbow, ending his life as a swordsman, Kenshin stops himself from killing when Kaoru calls out.^{[ch. 13]} Though spared, Jin-e stabs himself in the heart, so the police will not discover who his government employer is.^{[ch. 14]}

Watsuki intended for the motif of Jin-e to be Okada Izō, the top hitokiri of the Bakumatsu, but admitted that his design looks even less like his counterpart than Kenshin's looks like his. He was designed to be a "murderous ogre", the "polar opposite of Kenshin." The author described Jin-e as a "complicated fellow" who is "crazy-crazy" and not merely "crazy-acting." Although both the character and story were difficult, Watsuki said it was worth it as Jin-e was the fan-favorite bad guy. He summarized Jin-e as, in a sense, the only character to defeat Kenshin even though he did not defeat Battōsai. Jin-e's outfit originates from Serizawa Kamo, the main character from a Shinsengumi manga released around 14–15 years before the release of Rurouni Kenshin volume two in Japan. Jin-e's laugh, the "uhu-hu-hu," is from the character Ukon played by Ryōtarō Sugi in the television series Kenka-ya Ukon. The third volume of the drama CDs adapted the Jin-e story. Watsuki stated that for Jin-e, he wanted a voice actor with a "mature and cool voice" and not one with a "high voice." The character is voiced by Unshō Ishizuka in the drama. Jin-e came in tenth place in the series' first character popularity poll, and tied with Arai Iori for eighteenth in the second. He also ranked seventh in the "Who is Kenshin's Biggest Rival?" poll.

In Rurouni Kenshin: Restoration, Jin-e is one of the assassins hired by Takeda Kanryū to kill Kenshin. His kidnapping of Kaoru and fight with Kenshin are similar with some differences. He has holes in both hands from when Kenshin pierced them during the Bakumatsu, where he now inserts hilt-less swords to fight. Watsuki said that many of the changes he made to Jin-e in Restoration did not work out, proving that the original version is perfect. Giving Jin-e a motive to attack Kenshin, lost some of his madness; leaving out the Shin no Ippō for being "too supernatural", diminished the excitement unique to shōnen manga; and the change in his skin tone to make him odder, made keeping the tone of the entire story consistent difficult. In the first live-action film, Jin-e is the principal antagonist who uses the Kamiya Kasshin-ryū style for horrific acts. Having acquired Kenshin's old katana after the Battle of Toba–Fushimi, Jin-e found employment under the corrupt, power-hungry businessman, Takeda Kanryū. While sent to assassinate Takani Megumi, Jin-e crosses paths with Kenshin and recognizes him. As Kenshin and Sanosuke deal with Kanryū, Jin-e captures Kaoru and paralyzes her lungs to force Kenshin into a duel that ultimately leads to his suicide. He is portrayed by Kōji Kikkawa.

=== Takeda Kanryū ===
Voiced by: Nobuo Tobita (1996 series), Mitsuaki Madono (2023 series) (Japanese); John Snyder (1996 series), Todd Haberkorn (2023 series) (English)

Takeda Kanryū (武田 観柳) is a cunning money-minded industrialist with a private army of about 60 men plus the Oniwabanshū led by Shinomori Aoshi.^{[ch. 15–17]} Takeda is the head of an opium dealing business where he forces Takani Megumi to create a stronger and fast-working recipe called "Spider's Web" in a scheme to gain a foothold in the arms industry by purchasing modern Western weapons.^{[ch. 28]} Managing to recapture Megumi, Kanryū finds himself over his head when Kenshin arrives at his manor and defeats Aoshi. He resorts to using a Gatling gun shooting at everyone, killing the members of the Oniwabanshū.^{[ch. 28]} After his weapon runs out of bullets, Kanryū is beaten and taken into police custody.^{[ch. 29]}

Watsuki modeled Takeda Kanryū after Takeda Kanryūsai, the Shinsengumi's Fifth Unit captain. He said that there was no actual model in terms of design. He described Takeda Kanryū as a "carryover" of Nishiwaki, a character in the first Rurouni: Meiji Swordsman Romantic Story one-shot. Kanryū wears white since Watsuki felt that "between Kenshin and Aoshi, there was too much black already." Watsuki felt that since he emphasized Megumi and the Oniwabanshū, Kanryū never became the character he intended, which "was a bit of a letdown." The historical Takeda Kanryūsai is well known for being homosexual. Watsuki considered making Kanryū homosexual, but dropped the idea as he felt it would "unnecessarily complicate things." He is portrayed by Teruyuki Kagawa in the first live-action film. For Rurouni Kenshin: Restoration, Watsuki did not plan on making any drastic changes to Kanryū but was inspired to after seeing Kagawa's "fanatical" performance in the film.

=== Isurugi Raijūta ===
Isurugi Raijūta (left) and Tsukayama Yutarō (right)

Voiced by: Ryūnosuke Ōbayashi (1996 series), Kenta Miyake (2023 series) (Japanese); Richard Epcar (1996 series) (English)

Isurugi Raijūta (石動 雷十太) is a swordsman dissatisfied with the current state of swordsmanship who travels around Japan shutting down modern shinai dojos by force.^{[ch. 35]} He plans to revive the old style of swordsmanship (satsujin-ken, "swords that bring death") with the Shinko-ryū (真古流; "Old School Style"), a league composed only of the strongest swordsman in order to create a pure kenjutsu stronger than any martial art or European firepower.^{[ch. 37]} He is accompanied by his "apprentice" Tsukayama Yutarō, whose rich family funds his campaign.^{[ch. 41]} His signature technique is the vacuum-wave Izuna. Kenshin realizes that despite all his talk of the killing sword, Raijūta has never actually killed anyone himself and is a fraud.^{[ch. 42]} Kenshin defeats him, but Raijūta picks up Yahiko and threatens to kill him. When Raijūta is confronted with the choice of actually killing someone, Kenshin explains what satsujin-ken truly entails; the weight of the lives you have taken "dragging you to hell." Raijūta's confidence breaks down and he can no longer wield a sword again.^{[ch. 43]} In the first anime, Raijūta is depicted as an actual murderer, ruthlessly killing the thugs he hired to con his way into Yutarō's fortune. His goals are also distinct—rather than revitalizing swordsmanship by challenging dojos, his Shinko-ryu faction rebels plot a coup against the Meiji government, relying on superior sword skills. However, they ultimately fail when Kenshin defeats Raijūta.

Watsuki intended for Raijūta to be the opposite of Kenshin, "intelligently macho and a believer of satsujin-ken." But somehow, he became "a total fake" who became "a smaller and smaller man" as the story progressed, until he was "defeated by a single blow—ending almost as a villain." The author concluded that designing and developing Raijūta taught him "quite a bit," and he wanted to give Raijūta "peace" in future stories, but added "then again...this guy—! Sigh." Raijūta's appearance was originally based on an American superhero comic book character, but as the story progressed, his appearance and personality "deteriorated." Because he had difficulty with "the complicated details" in the Oniwabanshū story arc, Watsuki gave Raijūta a relatively simple outfit with only one design flourish, the black feathers, which turned out to be difficult to draw. Watsuki concluded that the development of Raijūta taught him a lot about character design.

=== Akamatsu Arundo ===
Voiced by: Kazuhiro Nakata (1996 series), Ryōta Takeuchi (2023 series) (Japanese); Tom Wyner (1996 series), Kane Jungbluth-Murry (2023 series) (English)

Akamatsu Arundo (赤末 有人) is a mercenary of Shibumi, a corrupt politician. Because Arundo is jealous that Shibumi orders Saitō Hajime to kill Kenshin, Saitō allows Arundo to have the job, knowing he stands no chance.^{[ch. 50]} Arundo ambushes Kenshin and tries to use a chain to immobilize Kenshin but is ultimately defeated.^{[ch. 51]} Arundo discovers that Saitō is allied with Ōkubo Toshimichi. When Arundo, fearing for his safety, decides to cut ties with Shibumi and flee to Shanghai, Saitō appears and decapitates Arundo with a strike from his sword.^{[ch. 55]}

Watsuki stated, "this character's only there to get beat up." Appearing to aid story development, Arundo does not have much personality aside from arrogance (Watsuki's favorite personality trait for villains). Watsuki believes that he could not make Arundo's chain-scythe appear like real chains. The character's design originates from a superhuman soldier in an American comic book who has a name similar to Arundo's, that being X-Men's Omega Red (aka meaning "red", and matsu corresponding to "end", equivalent to "Omega", which is the last letter of the Greek alphabet - also related to the Christian concept of Alpha and Omega). Arundo's use of chains also parallels Omega Red's carbonadium tentacles.

=== Senkaku ===
Voiced by: Tetsuo Komura (1996 series), Satoshi Tsuruoka (2023 series) (Japanese); Beau Billingslea (1996 series) (English)

Senkaku (尖角) is a minion of Shishio Makoto who oppresses Shingetsu village, which after two years has been abandoned by the government.^{[ch. 66]} Senkaku killed Mishima Eiji's brother and parents after learning that the boys were plotting to escape the village.^{[ch. 66]} He claims to have killed 99 people. Senkaku fights with a pair of knuckle blades and has high speed, contrary to his size. However, this proves to be his undoing, as Kenshin defeats Senkaku in a battle by using the gigantic size to stress out Senkaku's limits, causing his leg to break.^{[ch. 69]} The police take Senkaku away, in which Saitō notes he would most likely be executed.^{[ch. 71]} In the anime, he manages to escape and is killed by Seta Sōjirō.

Originally, Senkaku was one of the Juppongatana, so Watsuki put a lot of effort into his creation. But since Shishio and Sōjirō were present and Kenshin needed to go to Kyoto, he decided to make Senkaku a "violent village despot." Originally the author had Senkaku as an experimental character who could not form any words. Still, an editor commented that Senkaku "is not a wild animal" during a meeting, so Watsuki scrapped this idea. Senkaku had no model for his personality, and after the scrapping of the inarticulation trait he became "pretty much just muscle-head small fry." Senkaku's design originates from the design of the four Abukuma priests, a group of minor antagonists. Watsuki had no attachment towards the four bald priests, but felt that the cone-shaped head design was "a waste for an unimportant character." So he instead used that design for Senkaku, who Watsuki said turned out to be unimportant also. In retrospect Watsuki felt that the Coneheads may have influenced him in a Sega Saturn commercial, and the Giant Soldier in Nausicaä of the Valley of the Wind. The author felt regret about Senkaku; what he regretted most was how he could not use Senkaku's special technique "Piercing Head-Butt" in the storyline.

=== Shishio Makoto ===
Shishio Makoto (志々雄 真実) is the leader of the Juppongatana and the primary antagonist of the Kyoto arc. Shishio was Kenshin's successor as hitokiri for the Ishin Shishi. When the new Meiji government discovered Shishio's insatiable lust for power, they attempted to kill him and lit his body on fire. But he survived and has gathered an army to exact his revenge and overthrow the government.

=== Komagata Yumi ===
Voiced by: Kanako Irie (1996 series), Haruka Tomatsu (2023 series) (Japanese); Wendee Lee (1996 series), Claire Hamilton (New Kyoto Arc) (English)

Komagata Yumi (駒形 由美), also known as "Caretaker" (夜伽, Yotogi),^{[ch. 97]} is Shishio's lover. She was the most famous oiran in Yoshiwara and took pride in it, until the María Luz Incident.^{[ch. 148]} She became reviled at the Japanese government's refusal to compensate the newly emancipated prostitutes due to it regarding them as equivalent to livestock.^{[ch. 148]} She serves as Kenshin, Saitō and Sanosuke's guide through Shishio's maze-like hideout, taking them from each duel to avoid traps.^{[ch. 107]} She is often concerned about Shishio and his medical state.^{[ch. 136, 141]} When Shishio's body becomes overheated in his fight with Kenshin, she runs in between them and pleads with Kenshin to end the duel. Still, Shishio runs her through with his sword, mortally wounding her and injuring the unguarded Kenshin.^{[ch. 144]} Knowing that she has finally been of use to Shishio in his most important battle, she dies happy and released from her former frustration for not being able to fight next to him.^{[ch. 144]} She is then seen with Shishio and Hōji in hell.^{[ch. 148]}

Yumi was initially designed to be an attractive accessory for Shishio, as Watsuki believed a villain ought to have a "temptress" or two nearby. He was surprised to see her develop into such a love-driven character. In commenting on her death, the author stated that he saw Yumi's happiness following Shishio everywhere, including hell. Watsuki had no particular personality model for Yumi. Still, the character is essentially a version of Ogin, a character played by actress Kaoru Yumi in Mitokōmon Gaiden: Kagerō Ninpō-Chō, a spinoff series of Mitokōmon. Having designed Yumi on the spot with the intention of her being sexy, Watsuki had no specific design model. But halfway through, Watsuki became a fan of Morrigan Aensland from Vampire Hunter and, as a result, began to expose more and more of Yumi's cleavage and shoulders, "eventually increasing the sexiness by about 120%." Admitting that he has always had trouble drawing women, Watsuki stated that drawing Yumi taught him that he could have fun while drawing female characters not just by making them appear "cute," but also by making them "seductive, or even evil." He added that, since Yumi had a "sexed-up body," botching even one line could make the character appear "downright indecent." Watsuki stated that in this way, Yumi taught him the importance of skillful sketching. She is portrayed by Maryjun Takahashi in live-action films.

=== Juppongatana ===
The Juppongatana (十本刀; lit. 'Ten Swords') are a group of ten elite assassins founded and commanded by Shishio Makoto to assassinate Meiji government officials upon their planned revolution.^{[ch. 76]} Based in Mount Hiei,^{[ch. 87]} they are the primary antagonist group of the Kyoto arc. Although he does not officially join them, Aoshi works with the Juppongatana in order to fight Kenshin again, even allowing them to attack Aoi-Ya.^{[ch. 87]} Watsuki said that several of his assistants suggested ideas for the Juppongatana and that many of the characters grew out of these ideas. In Watsuki's original concept, except for Sōjirō none of the Juppongatana were intended to be "lookers." The author added Kamatari and Fuji at a later point. When Watsuki felt that Saizuchi, had not been used to his full potential, in retrospect he wondered if having six or seven members of the organization would have been sufficient instead of ten.

==== Sadojima Hōji ====
Voiced by: Hiroshi Takahashi (1996 series), Kentarō Itō (2023 series) (Japanese); David Mallow (1996 series), David Vincent (2023 series) (English)

Sadojima Hōji (佐渡島 方治), also known as "All-knowing" (百識, Hyakushiki),^{[ch. 97]} is Shishio's second-in-command.^{[ch. 76]} He used to be an official in the Meiji government but lost faith in it when he saw no one in the government worthy of leading the country.^{[ch. 90]} He abandoned his position in the government and eventually met Shishio. Hōji envisions Japan as a mighty power led by Shishio, ruling with the principles of basic animal survival. Although he is not proficient in any fighting style, he is a cunning organizer and possesses formidable leadership qualities. He manages to acquire firearms on the black market and purchases the gigantic ironclad warship—Rengoku (煉獄; "Purgatory") without anyone knowing.^{[ch. 76, 99]} Hōji's plan with the Rengoku fails when Sanosuke blows it up with bombs. Hōji disagrees with Shishio using the Juppongatana to fight Himura Kenshin, believing they might lose, putting their actual goal to overthrow the government in jeopardy.^{[ch. 76]} But he strongly believes in Shishio's strength, even throwing away a gun he had hidden after Shishio and Kenshin's fight surpasses Shishio's fifteen-minute time limit.^{[ch. 141]} He is in utter disbelief when Shishio finally loses upon bursting into flames and destroys Shishio's hideout in an attempt to kill Kenshin and company rather than accept his master's defeat.^{[ch. 146]} He is saved by Anji and then surrenders himself to the police, not for penance but to use the trial to project Shishio's ideals and plans.^{[ch. 146]} However, he is never given a trial and, although he was offered a government job should he pledge loyalty to it, Hōji commits suicide in his cell; using his blood to write a final message detailing his disgust with the regime: "The world is dead to me. I go to serve my lord in Hell."^{[ch. 148]} In Hell, Hōji is reunited with Shishio and vows to continue following him in his new quest to conquer Hell.^{[ch. 148]}

Watsuki stated that most of the overall concept for Hōji originates from a character in X-Men, whose name sounds similar to Hōji's; the X-Men character gave him a "hint" for the story but not Hōji's personality. The X-Men character does not directly fight but instead invents machines to help his team members, so Watsuki wanted a character who held a support role in the Juppongatana. At first Hōji was just an individual who was surprised a lot, but Watsuki realized that would "get awfully dull." When he decided to look at Hōji as Shishio's "Number Two" man (like Hijikata Toshizō or Shokatsuryō Kōmei) it "strummed the chords of [his] heart," and ideas came one after another until Hōji became one of his favorite characters. Watsuki stated that Hōji's character design is "100% original" to him and that it is one of which he is the most confident. Watsuki added that the one aspect he did not like about Hōji is his costume; he had wanted to make it more like the "European style authentic" to the period but could not find any resources. The author revealed that by the end of the Kyoto arc, Hōji would become "a pretty cool guy."

==== Seta Sōjirō ====
Seta Sōjirō (瀬田 宗次郎), also known as "Heaven's Sword" (天剣, Tenken),^{[ch. 97]} is a teenage boy who is Shishio's right-hand man and the strongest of the Juppongatana.^{[ch. 114]} He is noted in the series for always smiling and lacks any emotion but "comfort," making him impossible to read.^{[ch. 70]} He has been with Shishio the longest and is the most trusted member of the Juppongatana,^{[ch. 93]} having met Shishio when he was a small boy. He had witnessed Shishio brutally killing police officers, but Shishio ordered him to keep him in a safe house and provide for him instead of killing him. Days pass and Sōjirō tended to him and explained his situation with his abusive relatives. Shishio then explained his creed of survival of the fittest and gives him his sword. When Sōjirō is caught harboring Shishio in his family's rice silo, his older relatives try to kill him, thinking they can pin it on Shishio. As a result, Sōjirō kills them in self-defense and goes off with Shishio to become his protege.

==== Yūkyūzan Anji ====
Voiced by: Yasuyoshi Hara (1996 series), Wataru Hatano (2023 series) (Japanese); Michael McConnohie (1996 series), Lowell Bartholomee (New Kyoto Arc), Chris Jai Alex (2023 series) (English)

Yūkyūzan Anji (悠久山 安慈), also known as "Bright King" (明王, Myō-ō) after Fudō Myō-ō,^{[ch. 107]} is a warrior monk and member of the Juppongatana. Anji is the third strongest and most merciful of the Juppongatana and has agreed with Shishio that Anji shall decide whether someone lives or dies.^{[ch. 103]} He fights alongside Shishio to destroy the Meiji government who did nothing to stop the anti-Buddhist purge which resulted in the destruction of his home and the deaths of the five orphaned children he cared for in his temple, who came from families who were killed during the Boshin War.^{[ch. 110]} Though he is a "fallen priest," who feels no shame in violating the directives of Buddha,^{[ch. 72]} he still wishes to save the world, but believes in doing so by killing those who are evil to save the pure.^{[ch. 107]} Over ten years he developed the "Mastery of Two Layers" (二重の極み, Futae no Kiwami) technique, which delivers two hits within 1/75 of a second, allowing him to smash rocks with his limbs.^{[ch. 72]} Upon meeting Sagara Sanosuke in a forest, he teaches him his secret technique, without realizing Sanosuke is allied with Kenshin.^{[ch. 72]} Although Anji is a master of the technique, his later fight with Sanosuke ends when Sanosuke creates the "Mastery of Three Layers" and Anji drops to his knees when Sanosuke points out that the orphans' souls do not care about his mission to save the world, they only want him to be happy.^{[ch. 111]} After Shishio's death, Anji chooses to serve 25 years in a Hokkaidō prison.^{[ch. 147]} Five years later, Anji is transferred out of prison to Hakodate by its Kendo instructor Sugimura Yoshie (Nagakura Shinpachi), reuniting with former Juppongatana member Seta Sojiro on the way.

Watsuki developed Anji before the publication of Rurouni Kenshin; he appears as an extra in the second Rurouni: Meiji Swordsman Romantic Story one-shot. However, he had difficulty determining Anji's backstory and whether he would be a friend or foe, so he put Anji in "storage" until his ultimate introduction. Having determined that Sanosuke needed to become more powerful, Watsuki introduced Anji as a counterpart to Sanosuke's fighting style, so that he could give Sanosuke a strong opponent and increase Sanosuke's power at the same time. Watsuki had no model for Anji's personality, but pictured him as being similar to Shinsengumi lieutenant Shimada Kai due to the "manly air." He also said that Anji is his second attempt at "manly intelligence," following the "failed" Isurugi Raijūta. Anji's visual model originates from the lead vocalist of a punk band called Angie, and his name originates from the band's as well. Watsuki said that their bandannas on shaved heads and the black makeup under the eyes looks "cool" but still gives an impression suggesting intelligence. Instead, he intended to give Anji a "power-fighter" design but settled for "macho". Although the reader response to Anji's story was mostly positive, looking back on it Watsuki said he was an immature writer then. Watsuki planned to have more to Anji's story, but with five weeks' worth of material, he had to significantly cut it down so it would not interrupt the flow of the fighting; he originally planned to have Anji's heart momentarily stop due to the "Mastery of Three Layers." The author assesses that if one reads into the story deeply enough, one can see that Anji's "rampage" to the dark side was stopped. Still, his soul has yet to be "saved." Watsuki said that while he had nothing specific about Anji's later adventures, they were slowly coming to him and he might write it down if the chance presents itself. Anji came in tenth place in the series' second character popularity poll.

==== Sawagejō Chō ====
Voiced by: Shinichi Fukumoto (1996 series), Nobuhiko Okamoto (2023 series) (Japanese); Derek Stephen Prince (1996 series), David Matranga (New Kyoto Arc), Catero Colbert (2023 series) (English)

Sawagejō Chō (沢下条 張), also known as "Sword Hunter" (刀狩, Katanaga), is a swordsman and member of the Juppongatana.^{[ch. 76]} A native of Osaka,^{[ch. 76]} Chō has a very calm and relaxed exterior and keeps typically one eye closed when talking, only opening both eyes when excited in the heat of battle. He speaks with an Osaka-ben accent.^{[ch. 79]} He possesses quite a collection of rare and unusual swords, including; a double-bladed blade known as Renbatō (連刃刀; "Repeater") and his favorite, a thin long flexible sword he keeps hidden wrapped around his waist named Hakujin (薄刃乃; "The Thin One").^{[ch. 78, 79]} Having heard of Arai Shakkū's last sword, Chō intimidates Arai Seikū's wife into revealing its location; the blade was offered to a temple.^{[ch. 77]} Because he takes Seikū's son Iori with him, Kenshin fights Chō even though his sakabatō is broken. After hearing him talk of the new era, Seikū entrusts Kenshin with his father's last sword.^{[ch. 80]} Despite assuming the sword to be a normal one, Kenshin is forced to use it to stop Chō; only to learn that it is another sakabatō.^{[ch. 81]} After Shishio's death, Chō, who was given a full pardon in exchange for information, pays Kenshin and his friends a visit to inform them of what has happened to the members of the Juppongatana before going to work under Saitō as a spy and informant.^{[ch. 147]} He later appears several times in the Jinchū arc investigating or relaying information about Enishi.^{[ch. 183, 200, 213]} In the anime, Chō later appears when he tries to attack Amakusa but is soundly defeated.

Watsuki had no particular model for Chō's personality, but said that if he had to give one, it would be the stereotyped depictions of people from the Kansai region. An assistant from Kansai checked Chō's accent, but Watsuki had it "broken down" so that everyone from Japan can understand it; meaning Chō's Kansai accent differs from the actual one. Watsuki created Chō's basic design when he was 20 years old; originally designed to be a space alien. While Watsuki did not use the alien aspect, he said the "horse-headed monkey-face" was "hard to throw out completely," so he used it for Chō. The original design had black, "messy" hair swept back, but he gave Chō a "punk rock" quality to give the character more impact as the first Juppongatana member shown. Despite being a villain, Chō was a popular character with Rurouni Kenshin readers; Watsuki said that characters with Kansai dialects are "always pretty popular." Because he also enjoyed drawing Chō, the author felt it would be "a waste" to "finish off" Chō after the conclusion of the Iori story and therefore had him reappear at later points. But in "a bit more of a neutral position" since Watsuki felt it would be strange for Chō to "become friendly with Kenshin and the others." Chō ranked ninth in the "Who is Kenshin's Biggest Rival?" poll. He is portrayed by Ryosuke Miura in Rurouni Kenshin: Kyoto Inferno and Rurouni Kenshin: The Final .

==== Uonuma Usui ====
Voiced by: Shō Ryūzanji (1996 series), Junichi Suwabe (2023 series) (Japanese); Jamieson Price (1996 series), Jonathon Ha (2023 series) (English)

Uonuma Usui (魚沼 宇水), also known as "Blind Sword" (盲剣, Mōken),^{[ch. 97]} is a member of the Juppongatana. Equal to Sōjirō in strength, he is the member most feared by Shishio.^{[ch. 93]} Before the revolution, he was a swordsman working for the Shogun as an anti-hitokiri. In a fight against Shishio, he was blinded in both eyes and has trained to take revenge ever since.^{[ch. 93]} Usui and Shishio made a deal upon him joining the Juppongatana; Usui can try to kill Shishio anytime he gets the chance.^{[ch. 93]} A native of the Ryukyu Islands, Usui fights using a short spear with a weighted end - the rochin - to attack, and a tortoise shell - the tinbei - as a shield to deflect attacks and block the enemy's vision.^{[ch. 114]} He possesses the Shingan (心眼; mind's eye), which is actually superhuman hearing that lets him hear another's a heartbeat, muscle contractions and bone friction thus enabling him to read their emotions and physical position.^{[ch. 113]} Usui dies when his body is ripped in half by Saitō's attack.^{[ch. 114]}

Usui originated from a chat Watsuki had with one of his assistants who proposed a blind swordsman. Although originally not interested in the idea, Watsuki decided to go with it after discussing the Shingan ability that read people's emotions by listening to their heartbeat and pulse. The original plan was to have Usui fight Kenshin right after he fought Chō - chasing him down in the city like the Terminator. Still, the plot went in a different direction, with Usui fighting and dying at the hands of Saitō. Watsuki stated that the Terminator-like character he did not use would show up after the Kyoto arc. The author said he regretted creating Usui like he regretted creating Raijūta, but that Usui became more popular and therefore "that must also mean" Usui is stronger. The model for Usui's design is Taopaipai from Dragon Ball by Akira Toriyama; Watsuki said that as the first villain to defeat Son Goku, Taopaipai made "a strong impression." As for the "eyeball-covered costume," Watsuki originally planned to give Usui a plain "tribal" outfit, but scratched that idea after seeing the "spider-like angel" in Neon Genesis Evangelion. He originally planned to make Usui a "handsome, long-haired type." Still, when he saw a rough sketch of the concept, it looked too much like Ukyō from Samurai Spirits, so he started over. Despite Usui's final look originating from several different sources, Watsuki believed "it came out pretty well." Usui came in seventeenth place in the second character popularity poll of the series.

==== Honjō Kamatari ====
Voiced by: Junko Takeuchi (1996 series), Ayumu Murase (2023 series) (Japanese); Melodee Spevack (1996 series), Meli Grant (2023 series) (English)

Honjō Kamatari (本条 鎌足), also known as "Great Scythe" (大鎌, Ōgama),^{[ch. 97]} is a crossdressing member of the Juppongatana. A man with a feminine appearance, he is homosexual and loves Shishio deeply. But knows that he will never be loved like Yumi, with whom he has a rivalry,^{[ch. 97]} nor will he ever become as talented as Sōjirō.^{[ch. 124]} Kamatari is one of the Juppongatana sent to attack Aoi-Ya.^{[ch. 112]} He uses a very heavy scythe-like weapon with a chain and a ball on end.^{[ch. 123]} His special techniques are Midare Benten (乱弁天), where the scythe is whipped over his head and the chain forms a sphere, therefore creating both an offensive and defensive attack.^{[ch. 123]} Benten Mawashi (弁天独楽) makes use of his broken scythe by twirling the blade and chain rapidly like the blade of a helicopter.^{[ch. 124]} Kaoru and Misao defeat Kamatari in a two-on-one battle. He then tries to commit suicide with a needle, but Misao knocks him unconscious, preventing him from driving it into his neck.^{[ch. 124]} Pardoned for his crimes, the government hopes to use Kamatari as a foreign spy under the guise of an exchange student, but his sadness over Shishio's death has him contemplating suicide.^{[ch. 147]} So Chō lies to Kamatari, claiming that Shishio wanted the Juppongatana to live and spread his story to prevent the government from rewriting it in the event of their loss.^{[ch. 147]}

The concept for Kamatari originated from a play on words by Watsuki's assistant Eiichiro Oda; in Japanese, okama (お釜) is a slang word for homosexual, while the word for a scythe is kama (鎌). Watsuki used ideas from assistants to create many of the Juppongatana and Kamatari was one he seized immediately. Still, when coming up with the specifics, the concept "just wasn't coming together." In the beginning, some of his ideas were "male-appearing on the surface, but personality-wise, will be feminine," "A very erotic and seductive, womanly appearance from the outside, but a manly man on the inside," and "a big macho gay guy." But a friend of Watsuki's suggested making Kamatari "just a 'pretty girl' type," leading to the solidification of the character. Watsuki planned for Kamatari to have a "light-hearted and cheerful" personality, but found complications when a "more serious side" began to emerge, leading him to feel some regret with the outcome; he admitted that one of his bad habits is to cross the fine line between "serious" and "depressing". Watsuki added that the next time he uses the character, he would try to "keep his outlook sunny" while not compromising the "essential self." Watsuki used Ikari Yui from Neon Genesis Evangelion as the visual model for Kamatari's face; but colored the hair black, exposed more of the forehead, and had the back of Kamatari's hair "flip out as I've seen so many high-schoolers do these days." Watsuki found that the character's triangular silhouette has influences from Rei-Rei in Vampire Hunter. The large chain-scythe that Kamatari uses exists in real life, but Watsuki made the blade larger to give it "a real super-impact look" and noted that it is not intended to be used in the way that Kamatari does. Kamatari came in sixteenth place in the series' second character popularity poll and tenth in the third.

==== Kariwa Henya ====
Voiced by: Eiji Takemoto (1996 series), Ryōta Ōsaka (2023 series) (Japanese); Dan Martin (1996 series) (English)

Kariwa Henya (刈羽 蝙也, Kariwa Hen'ya), known as the "Flighted" (飛翔, Hishō),^{[ch. 121]} is a member of the Juppongatana sent to attack Aoi-Ya.^{[ch. 112]} He wears a black cloth over his mouth and what looks like a black robe, but turns out to be a glider shaped like bat wings folded around his body. His battle technique is called Fire Flight (飛空発破, Hiku Happa), in which he uses dynamite to lift himself into flight and attack from above with a blade on his arm before blowing himself back into the air.^{[ch. 122]} The power of flight is harnessed thanks to Henya starving himself to extreme emaciation; he is so light that the constant uplift from the explosions can easily keep him in the air with the wings.^{[ch. 12]} Yahiko defeats Henya by gliding on a shōji door blown up by Henya's dynamite and attacking him from above.^{[ch. 122]} Henya is pardoned for his crimes and used as an army spy in Asia by the government because of his aviation abilities.^{[ch. 147]}

Henya was modeled after Matsubayashi Henyasai, a swordsman in the early Edo period who possessed "avoidance techniques," which would now be called acrobatics in the modern era. Watsuki revealed that he originally planned to introduce Henya as a tengu during the Megumi arc as part of the Oniwabanshū. Still, that story was "not as well-planned as it otherwise might have been," so the chance was lost and Henya had to become one of the Juppongatana. It was originally planned for Henya to engage in a mid-air battle with Kenshin. Still, Watsuki felt that Kenshin had become too strong after learning the secret Hiten Mitsurugi-ryū technique, so Yahiko became his opponent instead. Henya's design model was a bat with a streamlined head and "a little bit" of Cyborg 002 from Cyborg 009. The author intended for Henya to be "monster-like" since none of the Juppongatana aside from Sōjirō were supposed to be "lookers." Watsuki reported that some people felt that Henya was "still too good-looking," so he made his body "super-emaciated." He said that Freak from Spawn was also a reference for Henya.

==== Iwanbō ====
Voiced by: Norito Yashima (1996 series), Takumi Yamazaki (2023 series) (Japanese); Lex Lang (1996 series), Rich Brown (2023 series) (English)

Iwanbō (夷腕坊), also known as "Ogre" (丸鬼, Maru Oni),^{[ch. 97]} is a fat oaf and one of the Juppongatana sent to attack Aoi-Ya.^{[ch. 112]} He fights using small blades worn on his fingertips and his large body; his skin is too thick to cut.^{[ch. 115]} He is very stupid and says very little. Despite defeating four members of the Kyoto Oniwabanshū by himself, Iwanbō flees when Henya and Kamatari are defeated.^{[ch. 124]} After Shishio's defeat, Chō remarks that Iwanbō is too stupid to do anything on his own.^{[ch. 148]} Iwanbō is later shown to be a karakuri puppet controlled from the inside by Gein.^{[ch. 152]} Gein uses the new Iwanbō Version Three, Savage Mode to fight Kenshin during the Six Comrades' attack on Kamiya dojo.^{[ch. 187]} This version has unrestricted detachable joints, allowing every limb to move in any direction, and anti-piercing armor of woven steel protecting Gein inside.^{[ch. 188, 190]} It is defeated when Kenshin lodges debris in its internal gears to stop its offense, and then destroyed by his strongest technique.^{[ch. 191]}

Following having a "giant" in the Juppongatana (Fuji), Iwanbō was created as a "full body costume." Although Watsuki admitted he might have included too many elements from the Kyoto arc in the Jinchū arc, he said he enjoyed the character of Iwanbō. Because he had to hide that it was just a costume, the author portrayed Version One as a very mysterious character, but the design kept changing and he became a "weird, but likable personality." Version Two was not intended to appear, but because Gein broke Version One, Watsuki had to "cut and paste" and later utilized this in the story. Version Three had to fight Kenshin and therefore was made into a "powerful suit." After all this, the author reflected that he seems to have gotten carried away, making Iwanbō feel out of place in the Rurouni Kenshin universe. The design models for Version One (and Two) were the characters Blob and Mojo from X-Men. But elements of Victor and Sasquatch from Vampire Hunter were also incorporated, making him "cuter." The design model for Version Three was the comic book character Hulk, specifically the version that was on Marvel X, a small booklet included in an issue of Wizard in relation to Age of Apocalypse. Version Three's full-body tattoo was added to give him the look of a "battling tribe" from an undeveloped world, but Watsuki said it does not look that good.

==== Saizuchi ====
Voiced by: Ikuo Nishikawa (1996 series), Bin Shimada (2023 series) (Japanese); Paul St. Peter (1996 series) (English)

Saizuchi (才槌), also known as "Destroying Yin" (破軍, Hagun),^{[ch. 97]} is a member of the Juppongatana and a cunning elder who manipulates the giant Fuji. Saizuchi's talents lie not in battle-abilities, but his proficient use of words. Having taken Fuji in after he was nearly killed, Saizuchi reminds Fuji that he has to repay him.^{[ch. 126]} During the Juppongatana's attack of Aoi-Ya, Saizuchi attempts to destroy the morale of the Oniwabanshū by giving a speech as to why it is impossible for them to defeat Fuji and himself.^{[ch. 125]} Saizuchi is knocked unconscious when Fuji's left arm falls on him upon being defeated by Hiko Seijūrō.^{[ch. 127]} Pardoned for his crimes, Saizuchi uses his gifts of persuasion for the Foreign Ministry in secret negotiations.^{[ch. 147]}

The overall model for Saizuchi is a villainous elf who tricks the giant in what Watsuki was told is a Finnish folktale called "Frost Giant"; he combined that with an "image of a giant-robot pilot." Originally Watsuki planned for Okina to fight Saizuchi, but he cut the concept because he wanted to maintain the balance of the story and because his "inner story-editor" asked him if anyone would really like to see "two old codgers" fight each other. The design model is Director-General Luchi of the Akuda Republic from Purin Purin Monogatari, an NHK puppet show. Watsuki said that the large size of Director-General Luchi's head would "freak me out." Watsuki commented that Luchi's design was "efficient" since one could tell that he was brilliant at one glance. Watsuki felt that of all the Juppongatana, Saizuchi got the "short end of the stick" since the character did not have a chance to fully display what his "massive brain could do." He described this as the "Senkaku Effect," where the characters with the "best noggins" are not used to their "full potential."

==== Fuji ====
Voiced by: Unshō Ishizuka (1996 series), Gakuto Kajiwara (2023 series) (Japanese); Beau Billingslea (1996 series), Lowell Bartolomee (New Kyoto Arc) (English)

Fuji (不二), also known as "Destroying Yan" (破軍, Hagun),^{[ch. 97]} is a member of the Juppongatana and a giant. Considered a freak by everyone around him, one day he was attacked and almost killed but Saizuchi found him and took him in.^{[ch. 126]} The gentle, depressed Fuji was in an ideal state for Saizuchi to manipulate his emotions and turn him into an unbelievable fighter. Saizuchi keeps telling Fuji that he owes him for saving his life and uses that to control him.^{[ch. 126]} Fuji is easily defeated by Hiko Seijūrō, who acknowledges Fuji's samurai soul and was the first to look at Fuji as someone other than a monster.^{[ch. 126, 127]} Pardoned for his crimes, the Meiji government assigns Fuji to Hokkaidō to develop land and act as a defending fighter during times of war.^{[ch. 147]}

The idea for a giant originated from the God Warrior in the Nausicaa of the Valley of the Wind, after Watsuki saw the film. He wondered if it would "even be interesting" for Kenshin to fight a giant, but could not let it go and so decided to have Fuji fight Hiko instead. Watsuki revealed that he and his editor both had doubts about actually doing it because Fuji was so big, but friends and assistants told him it would be fun and he was pleased that it seemed to have paid off. Fuji also utilized inspiration from what Watsuki was told is a Finnish folktale called "Frost Giant", in which a monster-like giant is revealed to have a heart. The design was inspired by the first Eva in Neon Genesis Evangelion. The face originated from Eva #2, but Watsuki's assistants believed the design looked too similar. So his then-assistant Hiroyuki Takei created a "skull-like riff on Eva #1" and Watsuki added the biting of his helmet's anchor rope feature, finishing Fuji's helmet face. Watsuki tried "very hard" to keep the body from being too similar to the Eva. Fuji's actual face originates from Dogura Magura in Arabian Lamp-Lamp by Takeshi Obata; Watsuki wanted to work with the concept of a "monstrous character who's still somehow good looking," which Watsuki says Dogura Magura is "the epitome of." The author admitted that due to the "tight" schedule of the Fuji chapters, he had insufficient time to revise the design, resulting in "an essentially unoriginal face."

=== Six Comrades ===
Five of the Six Comrades; clockwise from top: Kujiranami, Yatsume, Banjin, Gein, and Otowa

The Six Comrades (六人の同志, Rokunin no Dōshi) are a group of six men who each seek revenge against Himura Kenshin for their own reasons.^{[ch. 156]} Financed and conceived by Yukishiro Enishi, they are the primary antagonist group of the Jinchū arc. (Note: Hitokiri believed in tenchū ("judgment from the heavens"), and therefore they were fond of the word. Enishi believes that if the heavens will not judge Kenshin, he will give Kenshin jinchū, his own brand of judgment.) Rather than simply kill Kenshin, they decide they must make him recognize his past crimes first. The group agreed to disband then and whoever gets to Kenshin first gets to kill him.^{[ch. 156]} Because many of the Juppongatana were characters that were "hard to hate," Watsuki wanted to make the five comrades (excluding Enishi) in this storyline as "scum-like" as possible. But because he created villains with no ideals or beliefs, it was not easy to portray them as an enjoyable read.

==== Yukishiro Enishi ====
Yukishiro Enishi (雪代 縁) is the mastermind, financier and member number one of the Six Comrades, and the primary antagonist of the Jinchū arc. The younger brother of Yukishiro Tomoe, Enishi seeks revenge against Kenshin for killing his sister fifteen years earlier. In China, he taught himself the Watōjutsu (倭刀術) style, which was derived from Japanese kenjutsu.^{[ch. 202]} He is the head of a black market weapons smuggling organization that he runs with Woo Heishin.

==== Gein ====
Gein (外印), the "Artist of Karakuri" (機巧芸術家), is a member of the Six Comrades and the puppeteer behind Juppongatana member Iwanbō.^{[ch. 152, 188]} Gein was tasked with assembling the Six Comrades and acquiring them a mansion in Yokohama, while Enishi was still in Shanghai.^{[ch. 154]} However, Gein does not actually seek revenge against Kenshin.^{[ch. 156]} He is the last remaining descendant of a family who mastered the art of karakuri in the Middle Ages.^{[ch. 188]} He creates puppet-like suits out of human corpses, most notably the Iwanbō series.^{[ch. 211]} Gein is an older man, yet he is remarkably strong due to controlling his heavy puppets for so long. The diamond-edged steel wires he uses, Zankosen (斬鋼線), to control his puppets can also be used as a weapon as they are sharp enough to cut flesh and break bone.^{[ch. 216]} Gein just wants to test out his creations and needs to be around men of battle to do it since, according to him, the forefront of technology is always in battle.^{[ch. 188]} This is also the reason why Gein joined Shishio.^{[ch. 188]} During the attack on Kamiya dojo, Gein fights Kenshin by operating a new version of Iwanbō.^{[ch. 188]} For Enishi's Jinchū he creates a corpse doll of Kaoru to fool Kenshin into thinking she had been killed by Enishi, he considers this his masterpiece.^{[ch. 211]} Having completed his job, Enishi and Woo Heishin both decide to have Gein killed during his return boat ride to Tokyo, but Gein easily kills the large group of martial artists who attack him.^{[ch. 214]} When retrieving his Kaoru doll from the graveyard, he runs into a trap set by Aoshi, who knew that the corpse was a fake.^{[ch. 215]} Aoshi kills Gein after having him divulge where the real Kaoru is.^{[ch. 217]}

Gein originated from serial killer Ed Gein, who made lampshades and chairs out of corpses, combined with the puppet master required by the story. Watsuki suggested Gein might have been one of the most popular of the Six Comrades based on the many negative comments he got when he unveiled his face, like he did with Han'nya. He wanted to "challenge a good-looking masked character like Char from Gundam." Gein's obsession with functional and physical beauty comes from the author's own. Gein had no model in terms of physical design; his costume mixes the outfits worn by stage crew and a skull mark from his "necromancer" image. This minimal "highlights" outfit was a successful experiment for Watsuki's next work where he hoped to have fewer highlights to save time. Gein ranked eighth in the "Who is Kenshin's Biggest Rival?" poll. In the first live-action film, Gein appears as one of Kanryū's men and is portrayed by Gō Ayano.

==== Kujiranami Hyōgo ====
Kujiranami Hyōgo (鯨波 兵庫), the "Weapon Body" (武身合体),^{[ch. 154]} is a large one-armed man and member of the Six Comrades. While shown to be a relatively selfless person when first introduced, his nature is later distorted until he reaches the point of insanity. During the Battle of Toba–Fushimi in the Bakumatsu, Kujiranami's right arm was cut off by Kenshin.^{[ch. 154]} Kujiranami requested that Kenshin kill him since he did not want to live to see an era where wars are fought with guns instead of swords, absent of skill and soul. However, Kenshin refused, saying that he did not want to kill any more than he needed to and that Kujiranami should live in the new era. Already feeling that he had been robbed of a warrior's pride and era, being robbed of a warrior's death was the last straw for Kujiranami.^{[ch. 154]} Since then he vowed to kill Kenshin for dishonoring him and joined the Six Comrades to get his revenge. Enishi gave Kujiranami an Armstrong cannon to replace his missing arm which Kujiranami uses to blow up the Akabeko and Chief Uramura's home.^{[ch. 154, 155, 161]} During the attack on Kamiya dojo, he is taken down by Saitō and arrested,^{[ch. 207]} but later goes berserk in his jail cell and breaks out.^{[ch. 218]} He gets the upgraded weapon he received from Enishi, a grenade launcher, and goes on a rampage in Tokyo searching for Kenshin. Yahiko is the only one around to fight Kujiranami at the time and manages to hold him off until Kenshin arrives and cuts off his grenade launcher, which returns his sanity.^{[ch. 226]} Afterwards Yahiko manages to convince Kujiranami that his hatred for a fellow samurai is wrong and has done nothing for him except lead him down the wrong path. Moved to tears by Yahiko's words, Kujiranami accepts that he was wrong, apologizes to Kenshin and turns himself back into the police.^{[ch. 226]}

The idea for a one-handed fighter originates from Iba Hachirō, a swordsman from the Bakumatsu. Watsuki originally planned to make Enishi one-handed, but after considering the problems involving a one-handed swordsman facing the skilled Kenshin and deciding that "boss fights" should simply involve a sword versus a sword, he made Kujiranami one-handed instead. Kujiranami would be the Terminator-like character that Watsuki initially planned for Usui, but the idea was scrapped again due to him and his assistants being exhausted at the time. The design model for Kujiranami is Apocalypse from X-Men, one of Watsuki's favorite villains. He felt that Apocalypse's lips are "quite interesting," so he gave Kujiranami similar lips. Another theme used is "macho middle age fatness," which the author enjoyed depicting. Kujiranami ranked tenth in the "Who is Kenshin's Biggest Rival?" poll.

==== Inui Banjin ====
Inui Banjin (戌亥 番神) is a bloodthirsty, camouflage-wearing, hand-to-hand fighter and member number four of the Six Comrades.^{[ch. 155]} Inui wears gauntlets on his wrists called "Invulnerable Gauntlets" (無敵鉄甲, Muteki Tekkō) that can deflect any attack, even bullets, due to their angled design, and despite their thinness.^{[ch. 159]} Inui is skilled in Jutsushiki Muteki-ryū (術式無敵流), which is an amalgamation of various styles of martial arts. He is the student of Tatsumi who was killed by Kenshin fifteen years ago. Inui does not seek to avenge his master's death, whom he calls a loser, but is using it as an excuse to fight and prove how powerful he is.^{[ch. 159]} He likes to boast about being invincible and undefeated, but Sano figures out that Banjin is full of himself from wearing the gauntlets and that he only fights people weaker than him. Inui attacks Maekawa dojo as part of the Jinchū campaign while Otowa Hyōko simultaneously attacks Chief Uramura's house.^{[ch. 158]} During the encounter, Sanosuke wrecks one of his gauntlets with the Mastery of Two Layers.^{[ch. 160]} After receiving a pair of upgraded gauntlets from Enishi, the "Neo-Invulnerable Gauntlets", he fights Sano again during the attack on Kamiya dojo.^{[ch. 186]} In the end Inui provokes Sano into attacking him with the Mastery of Two Layers again and is defeated as a result with both of his gauntlets destroyed.^{[ch. 193]} After being taken down, Inui vows to kill Sano next time and Sano welcomes him to try but warns him that he will not win as long as he wears the gauntlets to cover his weakness. Banjin is arrested by the police afterwards.

Originally considered for the Juppongatana, Inui started as a "camouflage costume character." Then he was going to have army style hand-to-hand combat, but when it was questioned whether or not such a thing existed in this time period, he changed to being a combined martial-arts user, with gauntlets added for uniqueness. His personality is that of a "very lively idiot" and is taken from Kazama Kazuki in Samurai Shodown. Kangetsu was also the design model for the character, specifically the version of Kangetsu that appears at the end of the game. Watsuki said that because a lot of different concepts went into Inui, he looks weird, which the author greatly regrets. He also regrets him looking too much like Kangetsu, and vowed that this would be the last time he uses Samurai Spirits as a design. However, Watsuki said he likes Inui quite a bit, and would like to create more of these "stupid types" in his next work. In the first live-action film, Inui appears as one of Kanryū's men and is portrayed by Genki Sudo. In the fourth film, his equivalent Inui Tenmon is portrayed by Joey Iwanaga.

==== Otowa Hyōko ====
Otowa Hyōko (乙和 瓢湖), the "Human Shadow Instrument" (人間暗器), is member number five of the Six Comrades and an effeminate-looking user of assassin's weapons or "Instruments of the Shadows".^{[ch. 155, 195]} He says he has thirteen hidden weapons all over his body, but only four are shown in the series. The first is Baika Chūzen (梅花袖箭), a small six-barreled arrow-launcher worn on his left wrist.^{[ch. 160]} The second is the Kasui Busuen (過水毒煙), a paralyzing mist generated by dropping two small cubes into water.^{[ch. 160]} The third is a jar of iron powder, Bishamon's Powder (毘沙門粉), used in conjunction with his magnetic Bishamon's Sword (毘沙門剣).^{[ch. 194]} The last is the Rikudōko (六道蠱), six long piercing tentacle-like appendages worn on his torso.^{[ch. 194]} His battle tactic is to outwit the opponent and catch them off guard with his hidden weapons as opposed to simply overpowering them. Otowa is a sadistic individual who enjoys killing people for fun and is not above targeting women and children. Otowa seeks Kenshin's death in revenge for the death of his friend Nakajō, whom he had competitive killing sprees with.^{[ch. 160, 172]} In reality Otowa joined the fight just for pleasure.^{[ch. 195]} Otowa attacks Chief Uramura's house as part of the Jinchū campaign while Inui simultaneously attacks Maekawa dojo.^{[ch. 158]} Otowa later fights Myōjin Yahiko during the attack on Kamiya dojo.^{[ch. 187]} He comes close to killing Yahiko with a few of his weapons, but Yahiko eventually defeats him.^{[ch. 196]} As Otowa goes down he has a crazed smile on his face as he could not believe his defeat at the hands of someone not even half his age;. However, Sanosuke notes Otowa was not in peak form because he feared Kenshin's abilities and thought of fleeing after the duel with Yahiko.^{[ch. 196]} Otowa is arrested by the police afterwards.

Watsuki had no personality model for Otowa and made him cruel because he is a shadow instrument user, which he notes resulted in him being like Kanryū. The author wanted to make him more cunning and sadistic, but said Otowa was not developed satisfactorily due to his own incompetence. Otowa's design model was a previously rejected "drag queen-ish" villain who wore a lot of lipstick. The six-pronged accessory was borrowed from Mr. Sinister in X-Men: Age of Apocalypse. Watsuki said that he feels Otowa is one of his better designed characters.

==== Yatsume Mumyōi ====
Yatsume Mumyōi (八ツ目 無名異; note: "Mumyōi" means "nameless", meaning he has no known given name) is a member of the Six Comrades who hides himself from the others, such as by hiding in the ceiling.^{[ch. 156]} A member of a famous gold mining clan, family tradition led them to elongate the limbs of their members using metal rings to help them mine better via "Body Shaping" (人体精製); similar to neck rings.^{[ch. 196]} As a result, Yatsume's limbs are about 1.5 times as long as normal, with the notable exception of his left arm, which is twice as long and equipped with metal claws. His teeth have also been sharpened into fangs from a young age, although his long tongue is natural.^{[ch. 197]} Fifteen years earlier, Yatsume took up fighting and joined the Yaminobu in order to support his clan, who had fallen on hard times due to depleted gold mines, by hoping to prove to the Tokugawa shogunate that their bodies had battle potential.^{[ch. 197]} But the Yaminobu were defeated by Kenshin and the Shogunate defeated by the Ishin Shishi. Yatsume wants revenge on Kenshin to uphold the laws of his clan (which state that anyone who sees a member of their clan must be killed) and for the misfortunes of his clan, which he blames on the Ishin Shishi and Kenshin.^{[ch. 196, 197]} Before he can fight Kenshin however, he ends up fighting Saitō instead and is brutally maimed in defeat, despite having managed to outmaneuver the man's trademark attack once.^{[ch. 198, 199]} Kenshin stops Saitō from killing him and offers to let Yatsume fight him if he still wants to after healing, but suggests that he go up north and use his abilities to help his clan.^{[ch. 199]} He is arrested by the police afterwards.

Yatsume's model was kumo otoko ("Spider Man"), not the American version, so he has similar roots as Han'nya. Because the "freaks" theme did not go so well with Han'nya, Yatsume is Watsuki's second attempt at it. But the author said he was utterly defeated, citing Saitō as the biggest reason; any character turns into a weakling in front of Saitō, just like Usui did. Watsuki said that the body shaping is one of the ideas he likes, but seems a little unfitting for a shonen manga. Because body deformation is a sensitive issue, he had to be careful how he dealt with it, which might have detracted from the storyline as a whole. He stated that there would be no further attempts at the freaks theme because he believes that there needs to be more "positive themes" in shonen manga; but will still use it in terms of design. Watsuki admitted that the design model is all "jumbled up." The silhouette version of Yatsume, seen before his full reveal, was modeled after the "bandana mask version" of Wolverine from X-Men and Carnage from Spider-Man. After being told by various people to "do Spider-Man, or to do Spawn and such," Watsuki got agitated and said "I'll throw in Venom also!," which he referred to as digging his own grave. The gold-mining clan backstory was added after the fact, but Yatsume still stuck out from the period.

=== Woo Heishin ===
Woo Heishin (呉 黒星, Ū Heishin; Hanyu Pinyin: Wú Hēixīng) is the second-in-command of Enishi's black market organization that smuggles weapons from Shanghai to Japan.^{[ch. 214]} While Enishi likes to rule from action and fear, Heishin rules from careful planning, and this balance is what allowed their organization to grow so fast. He possesses no true fighting skills and is guarded by the Sū-shin, who are skilled in various fighting styles.^{[ch. 238]} In exchange for being allowed to use the organization's resources for his personal Jinchū campaign, Enishi agreed to hand over total control of it to Heishin.^{[ch. 214]} After receiving control, Heishin tries to have the Sū-shin take Enishi's revenge by killing Kenshin.^{[ch. 237]} But all four are defeated by Kenshin's comrades, while Heishin is beaten up by Enishi. He later recovers and begins shooting with dual revolvers, managing to wound Kenshin before being beaten up by Enishi again, but just when Enishi is about to kill Heishin, Kenshin stops him.^{[ch. 250]}

Watsuki had no model for Heishin. He created him after his editor told Watsuki that he needed to put more depth into the black market weapons organization. Since the organization was made simply to explain Enishi's finances, Watsuki believed that the addition of Heishin "didn't seem to change anything." The author felt that chapters flew by and he was unable to set Heishin's personality, so he became "this pathetic creature." Even though Heishin was his favorite "#2," he became an unattractive character and Watsuki regretted how he turned out. Heishin also had no design model; he was designed around the time of the Tomoe chapters when Watsuki was aiming for originality and creating characters that did not obviously look like any other. Heishin was designed to be "heavy" on black to contrast with the "whiteness" of Enishi.

=== Sū-shin ===
The Sū-shin (四星 or 四神; Hanyu Pinyin: Sì Xīng or Sì Shén, "Four Stars" or "Four Gods") are Woo Heishin's personal bodyguards. They are identical quadruplets named after the four symbols of Chinese astrology, and each versed in a different form of combat. Heishin tries to have the Sū-shin take Enishi's revenge by killing Kenshin, but Kenshin's friends take them on so he can save his energy for Enishi.^{[ch. 237, 238]} Seiryū (青龍) fights using a naginata-like weapon and prides himself on being able to determine his opponents moves and conquer them. He lets himself be hit by Saitō's Gatotsu and correctly identifies its weakness as the blind spot created by extending the right hand as a counterweight. But Saitō defeats him with the move regardless by using his right hand to grab Seiryū by the mouth.^{[ch. 339]} Suzaku (朱雀) fights using two swords and prides himself on being able to mimic his opponents moves. He perfectly mimics Aoshi's dual sword attacks and is even faster than him, but Aoshi defeats him using martial arts.^{[ch. 340]} Byakko (白虎) fights using his fists and spiked knuckle blades and prides himself on simply attacking. Although he delivers a lot of blows, Sanosuke defeats Byakko as his attacks are too weak to do any damage.^{[ch. 341]} Genbu (玄武) fights with what looks like a staff but is actually a retractable six-jointed mace and prides himself on his battle strategy. He is defeated when Yahiko uses the Kamiya Kasshin-ryū secret technique and ultimately destroys his mace.^{[ch. 342]}

The Sū-shin had no personality models and were created simply to "fill out the numbers." As the story advanced towards Kenshin's final battle, Watsuki realized that the other characters would have no "glamour" and created the Sū-shin on the spot. Because they were "irresponsibly made," he initially named them the "Four Stars", but changed it to the "Four Gods" and individually named them after the four godly beasts. He realized this and tried to fix the dialogue but it "got weird" and the fights were not as glamorous as he had hoped. This made him realize how important it is to decide the scenes and plot in advance. The Sū-shin had no design models either; it was simply an easy to draw design and making them quadruplets in Chinese clothes without any tone. One can tell them apart by their head tattoos and weapons.

=== Yaminobu ===
The Yaminobu (闇乃武) were a group of assassins who were called the "Oniwabanshū of the West" and planned to kill Kenshin.^{[ch. 176]} They used Yukishiro Tomoe to get close to him and become his weakness.^{[ch. 175]} One of their members, Murakami (村上), a wielder of dual-katana chained at their hilts was the assassin Kenshin killed in front of Tomoe.^{[ch. 172]} Finally setting their plan into action in December 1864, they send Enishi to contact Tomoe and leave a note luring Kenshin to their "Binding Forest."^{[ch. 175]} Kenshin kills Nakajō (中条), a warrior who uses hidden weapons and successfully binds Kenshin's hearing with an explosion,^{[ch. 176]} and Sumita (角田), a large axe-wielder who binds his vision in another.^{[ch. 177]} Yatsume Mumyōi fights alongside Sumita but flees injured and vowing revenge;^{[ch. 177]} he later joins Enishi in the Six Comrades. With his senses impaired, Kenshin fights the leader Tatsumi (辰巳), a hand-to-hand fighter. Although Tatsumi has the advantage, he is killed by Kenshin when Tomoe jumps in between them.^{[ch. 178]} I'izuka (飯塚) was their spy in the Ishin Shishi. After Kenshin defeats the Yaminobu, Katsura Kogorō sends Shishio Makoto to kill I'izuka, having discovered his true affiliation.^{[ch. 179]}

=== Fudōsawa ===
Fudōsawa (不動沢) is a yakuza trying to take over a small town in Shinshū, former sumo wrestler, and nephew of Tani Jūsanrō.^{[ch. 229]} The only obstacle preventing him from taking over the town is the farmer Higashidani Kamishimoemon.^{[ch. 228]} Fudōsawa hires Sanosuke to fight the farmer, but Sanosuke realizes that Kamishimoemon is his father and that his family is being forced into poverty by Fudōsawa. Sanosuke defeats Fudōsawa's army of 200 men single-handedly and injures Fudōsawa, breaking six of his ribs.^{[ch. 234]}

== Other characters ==
=== Hiko Seijūrō ===
Voiced by: Shūichi Ikeda (1996 series, Trust & Betrayal, Reflection, New Kyoto Arc), Yuichi Nakamura (2023 series) (Japanese); Richard Epcar (1996 series; Media Blasters dub), Lex Lang (1996 series; Sony dub), Joe York (Trust & Betrayal), James Brownlee (Reflection), Andrew Love (New Kyoto Arc), Daniel Walton (2023 series) (English)

Hiko Seijūrō XIII (比古 清十郎 十三代, Hiko Seijūrō Jūsandai) is the thirteenth and current master of the 300-year-old Hiten Mitsurugi-ryū and Kenshin's swordsmanship instructor, who now works as a potter under the alias "Ni'itsu Kakunoshin" (新津 覚之進, Niitsu Kakunoshin).^{[ch. 84]} His imposing looks, unrivaled fighting prowess and inflated ego are trademarks of his character. Years ago, Seijūrō rescued a young boy named Shinta from a gang of bandits, took him under his wing and gave him the name "Kenshin".^{[ch. 94, 95]} He intended for the boy to one day succeed him as master of his deadly art, but the two severed ties when Kenshin abandoned his training in order to serve the Ishin Shishi.^{[ch. 84]} Fifteen years later, Kenshin seeks out Seijūrō and begs him to teach him the final technique of Hiten Mitsurugi-ryū. The master accepts after learning that Kenshin has spent a decade working for the weak and atoning for his sins.^{[ch. 85]} Seijūrō later appears when he assists the Kyoto branch of the Oniwabanshū by defeating the giant Fuji. He is portrayed by Masaharu Fukuyama in the live-action films.

Watsuki had no personality model for Hiko; when he imagined who the "Master" would be, the character initially became "this arrogant, twisted guy." The design model for the Hiko in Rurouni Kenshin is the character of the same name from his one-shot manga "Crescent Moon of the Warring States," but Watsuki also added some influences from Hiken Majin Hajerun in Takeshi Obata's Arabian Lamp-Lamp. When Hiko was placed in Rurouni Kenshin, the author simplified the design, such as changing the hair to make it easier to draw. Watsuki said that Hiko's body became "more macho" because he is a different kind of Hiten Mitsurugi-ryū swordsman and because of the addition of "manliness." At the time, Watsuki said that he was fascinated by images of "manliness" and that Hiko is one of the first characters to reflect this fascination. His cloak originates from the American comic book series Spawn. As one of his favorite characters, Watsuki wanted to use Hiko more often, but because he is more powerful than Kenshin, it was too difficult to find a place to use him in the story. Hiko came in ninth place in the series' second character popularity poll and eighth in the third.

=== Yukishiro Tomoe ===
Voiced by: Junko Iwao (Trust & Betrayal) (Japanese); Rebecca Davis (Trust & Betrayal) (English)
Portrayed by: Kasumi Arimura (live-action)

Yukishiro Tomoe (雪代 巴) was the wife of Himura Kenshin and biological sister of Yukishiro Enishi.^{[ch. 164]} The daughter of an Edo retainer to the Shōgun, Tomoe was engaged to Kiyosato Akira (voiced by Tetsuya Iwanaga; portrayed by Masataka Kubota in the live-action films), the second son of another similarly ranked family.^{[ch. 174]} Despite her happiness at the arrangement, she is unable to express her emotions openly (hence her keeping diaries to record her inner thoughts and emotions). This reticence left Kiyosato unaware of her thoughts, and—thinking that he needed to please her with greater accomplishments—made him join the Kyoto Mimawarigumi.^{[ch. 174]} He was killed by Kenshin in 1864 in Kyoto, but not before injuring him with the first half of his cross-shaped scar.^{[ch. 165]} Around six months later, Kenshin sticks up for Tomoe against two Aizu samurai in a pub. Later when she tries to thank him, she witnesses him kill an assassin sent to kill him.^{[ch. 167]} She faints, though Kenshin knows he should kill her for being a witness, he can not bring himself to do so and takes her to his room at an inn housing his fellow Chōshū Ishin Shishi. He asks her to promise to forget what she saw and leave, but instead she starts to work at the inn and the two develop feelings for one another.^{[ch. 168, 169]} Following the Ikeda-Ya and Kinmon incidents, the Chōshū are near ruin so Katsura Kogorō tells Kenshin to lay-low in a farm village and bring Tomoe to better blend in. Kenshin reveals to Tomoe that he does not want it only for appearance sake, and the two get married.^{[ch. 170]} When Enishi arrives to tell his sister that the Yaminobu operation to kill Kenshin is nigh, she sends him away, and subsequently reveals her past to Kenshin (but not about the current conspiracy).^{[ch. 173, 174]} The following morning, Tomoe leaves Kenshin to meet with the Yaminobu in the hopes of misleading them and saving his life, only to find that she was nothing but a pawn in their plans, and ended up being used as bait to draw him in for the kill.^{[ch. 175]} In the middle of Kenshin's duel with the leader of the Yaminobu, Tomoe throws herself between them. With his senses impaired, Kenshin is unable to see her until it is too late, and delivers a fatal blow to his opponent and to her with the same slash of his sword.^{[ch. 178]} The little sword she was holding falls from her hand and gives Kenshin the second part of his cross-shaped scar.^{[ch. 178]} A gravestone for Tomoe was erected in a Kyoto temple, where Kenshin also left her diaries.^{[ch. 181]}

Even though the plot for the "remembrance episodes" was already set before serialization started, which was three and a half years before her debut, Watsuki had no model for Tomoe other than a "super beautiful woman whose intent was unclear" or put simply "cool beauty." He said she became an Ayanami lookalike, with the only unique feature being her black pupils. The author said he did not realize that because cool beauties do not show emotion, once she revealed her true feelings in the end, she becomes a completely different character. He also pointed out that her death is the same as Yumi's. Watsuki said he not only regretted what he made her into, but was also "disgusted with himself." He said he did enjoy the first half when she was a cool beauty and would like to bring her back in a different work. In the live action films, she is portrayed by Kasumi Arimura.

=== Sekihara Tae ===
Sekihara Tae (right) and Sanjō Tsubame (left)

Voiced by: Michiko Neya (drama CD), Sumi Shimamoto (1996 series), Mamiko Noto (2023 series) (Japanese); Michelle Ruff (1996 series), Amber Lee Connors (2023 series) (English)

Sekihara Tae (関原 妙) is the manager of the beef hot pot (gyūnabe) restaurant owned by her father, the Akabeko (赤べこ) in Asakusa.^{[ch. 5]} She is Yahiko and Tsubame's boss, and Sanosuke owes her a seemingly large sum of money in which interest is accounted for. She tries to push the relationship between Kenshin and Kaoru since it seemed it to her that it was not working. The Akabeko is destroyed by Kujiranami Hyōgo at the start of the Six Comrades' revenge against Kenshin, but it is re-opened at a temporary located soon after.^{[ch. 154, 155, 182]} She has an identical twin sister named Sekihara Sae (関原 冴) who runs the family's original restaurant, the Shirobeko (白べこ) in Kyoto.^{[ch. 75]}

Watsuki originally created Tae as a plot convenience during Sanosuke's first appearance and he intended for Kaoru to patronize a restaurant operated by "a good friend." Tae's personality originates from Kamiya Megumi in Watsuki's first "Rurouni" story. As the story progressed Watsuki found himself adding additional details such as her family name, her status as the daughter of the owner of Akabeko, and her collecting of nishiki-e paintings. He said that Tae was his first character to evolve in this manner and he would like it to continue to surprise himself. The author said he used "no thought" while creating Tae, including a lack of planning in her character design, which originates from a rejected model for Kenshin with a prototype Kenshin hairstyle colored black and a "softer, female" face. Tae has no lipstick so she would be easily distinguished from Megumi. Watsuki originally intended for Tae to have a Kansai dialect and had an assistant from the Kansai region vet the dialog, but Watsuki ultimately rejected the idea after he felt the concept was becoming too strange.

=== Sanjō Tsubame ===
Voiced by: Yuri Shiratori (1996 series), Yūko Ōno (2023 series) (Japanese); Michelle Ruff (1996 series), Kimberley Anne Campbell (2023 series) (English)

Sanjō Tsubame (三条 燕) is a very shy and soft-spoken waitress at Tae's restaurant who becomes Yahiko's sweetheart.^{[ch. 31]} The former samurai her family worked for forces her to help him rob the Akabeko until he is defeated by Yahiko.^{[ch. 33]} When Himura Kenshin enters a deep depression after the supposed death of Kamiya Kaoru at the hands of Yukishiro Enishi, Tsubame pleads for Kenshin to help Yahiko fight back against one of Enishi's abandoned allies. Tsubame and Yahiko become a couple, and Watsuki mentioned in his notes that they had a son, Myōjin Shinya (明神 心弥, Myōjin Shin'ya), who he considered using in a story idea, though he never did.

Watsuki said that he did not have a specific model for Tsubame's personality. The storyline was created to act as a bridge to the Raijūta one and to give Yahiko the spotlight. The concept of "a young girl being a young man's motivation to act" introduced her as the heroine. The author used Tsubame as a "testament" of the "wrong thinking of a previous age" and gave her a manner that contrasts with Yahiko's "acts-before-he-thinks" manner. Her design model originated from a popular "planet-themed" anime series, particularly its character symbolized by the "ringed-planet." As Tsubame is "an average girl" the author decided that her hair should either be in a bowl cut or in pigtails, and after watching that anime he decided on a bowl cut. In the final chapter Watsuki designed Tsubame to look "as cute as possible" since he wanted a story where she was the heroine. Her new waitress outfit, which looks like a maid outfit, was going to be for his next work, but because the maid style was already being overdone at the time, he decided to include it in a work before it went out of style. Tsubame's name originates from places where Watsuki lived in Niigata. Tsubame came in fifteenth place in the series' second character popularity poll.

=== Chief Uramura ===
Voiced by: Sukekiyo Kameyama (1996 series), Shinobu Matsumoto (2023 series) (Japanese); Bob Papenbrook (1996 series), Bill Rogers (2023 series) (English)

Chief Uramura (浦村署長, Uramura-shochō) is the police chief.^{[ch. 2]} Because their first meeting is during a disturbance caused by his subordinates, he decides not to pursue Kenshin for illegally carrying a sword and also learns that Kenshin is a good person despite his reputation as Hitokiri Battōsai.^{[ch. 2]} He becomes a friend of Kenshin's and often informs him of local disturbances like when he requests assistance in stopping Udō Jin-e.^{[ch. 9]} During the Jinchū arc, Uramura's house is attacked and destroyed by Otowa and Kujiranami as part of Enishi's plan to strike at the places in Tokyo most important to Kenshin; but Uramura and his family are saved by Kenshin.^{[ch. 158, 161]} As a favor to Kenshin, he deliberately points the police in the wrong direction when they attempt to arrest Sanosuke towards the end of the series. In the anime adaptation he is named "Chief Muraki" (村木).

=== Oniwabanshū ===
The Tokyo Oniwabanshū, (Clockwise from top right): Shikijō, Han'nya, Beshimi, and Hyottoko

The Oniwabanshū (御庭番衆) were onmitsu or spies who protected Edo Castle from the shadows during the Edo period.^{[ch. 16]} In Rurouni Kenshin, they are Shinomori Aoshi, Han'nya, Shikijō, Hyottoko, Beshimi, Okina, Misao, and the others at the Aoi-Ya. Aoshi's group is referred as the Tokyo Group, while Misao and Okina's squad is known as the Kyoto Group. After the Bakumatsu, of all of the Oniwabanshū members, only Aoshi received job offers from government agencies, such as army intelligence and protection services of political leaders; Aoshi instead chose not to abandon his men.^{[ch. 28]}

Watsuki described the addition of the Oniwabanshū as a "last minute" choice. When the author first discussed the "Megumi arc" with his editor, the editor replied that "having a swordsman of Kenshin's caliber fighting a group of punk-thugs still coming into their first facial hair mi-i-ight not make for the most epic of manga." To solve this, Watsuki modified the real and historic Oniwabanshū to make them onmitsu (what are now known as ninja or shinobi; Watsuki does not like using the word "ninja" as he feels that using it "like that" is "cheesy"), and added details as publication progressed. He did purposely want a variety of shapes and temperaments for the various Oniwabanshū characters.

==== Beshimi ====
Voiced by: Taiki Matsuno (1996 series), Hiroyuki Yoshino (2023 series) (Japanese); Derek Stephen Prince (1996 series), Brian Beacock (2023 series) (English)

Beshimi (癋見) is the smallest of the Oniwabanshū and uses his stealth to compensate for his lack of strength. A cunning, but bottom-ranked onmitsu,^{[ch. 17]} Beshimi received no prosperous government job offers because of his physical competency in only one skill.^{[ch. 28]} His favorite weapons are spiral darts, with which he poisons Yahiko. He is gunned down by Kanryū's Gatling gun trying to help save Aoshi.^{[ch. 28]} In the anime only, one of his darts jams Kanryū's Gatling gun. Watsuki stated that Beshimi was "largely created on-the-spot" and does not have a motif. He said that without a personality set for him, the character turned out "kind of timid." Not originally intended to be a standalone character, Beshimi became shorter than Kenshin to add variety to the Oniwabanshū. Watsuki said that Beshimi's shortness and timidness gave him a group of fans who wrote to him calling the character "cute."

==== Hyottoko ====
Voiced by: Shōzō Iizuka (1996 series), Fukushi Ochiai (2023 series) (Japanese); Bob Papenbrook (1996 series), Rich Brown (2023 series) (English)

Hyottoko (火男) is the large and fat member of the Oniwabanshū. A mid-ranked omnitsu, Hyottoko breathes fire at his opponents by means of a large oil bag he keeps stored in his stomach with a nozzle coming out of his mouth, that he ignites by using his false teeth of flint.^{[ch. 17]} Hyottoko received no prosperous government job offers because he had competency in one skill.^{[ch. 28]} Hyottoko dies while charging for Kanryū as an unsuccessful decoy for Beshimi.^{[ch. 28]} Watsuki said he had no particular motif while designing Hyottoko; using his rudimentary kanji knowledge (the name Hyottoko is formed by the kanji for "Fire" and "Man"), he created a fire-breather. The creator made Hyottoko fat since he wanted the Oniwabanshū to represent several shapes and sizes and because the character would have a bag of oil in his stomach. Watsuki said that since he had never drawn a figure like that before, he went through several designs until he found one he could draw comfortably and repeatedly. Watsuki decided to give Hyottoko the ability to breathe fire, because he felt it would be natural for an "onmitsu" to be "flashy." Looking back, the author saw the character as somewhat out of place and "not really organic" to his world. According to Watsuki Hyottoko's fire breathing and Kenshin's sword spinning method to defeat it received criticism from fans, authors of dōjinshi fanzines, and personal friends. The author described Hyottoko as the guy who makes a big entrance and "then gets just as spectacularly beaten," who is "ridiculously confident" and "a bit of an idiot", but said that this is just the "natural evolution of the character, I guess."

==== Han'nya ====
Voiced by: Akio Nojima (1996 series), Ryōtarō Okiayu (2023 series) (Japanese); Tom Wyner (1996 series), Jalen K. Cassell (2023 series) (English)

Han'nya (般若, Hannya) is a skilled martial artist and was the master of intelligence for the Edo Castle Oniwabanshū.^{[ch. 23]} In the poor village he was born in, it is common to abandon a child at birth to reduce the number of people to feed. Han'nya survived and wandered around like an animal until Aoshi found him and trained him to be an Oniwabanshū.^{[ch. 24]} Thus he is extremely loyal to Aoshi, giving his life to allow Kenshin enough time to retrieve his sword to defeat Kanryū and save Aoshi.^{[ch. 28]} His arms have horizontal stripes painted on them, which gives them the appearance of being shorter than they actually are, thus luring opponents into a false sense of security regarding distance of attacks.^{[ch. 23]} He also wears steel gauntlets beneath his gloves, which help him to block attacks from other weapons.^{[ch. 23]} These gauntlets contain retractable steel claws, which he will resort to as a sort of trump card.^{[ch. 24]} Han'nya is also the master of disguise within the group; he gained his ability by removing all his prominent facial features, which is why he wears the demonic mask on his face. Han'nya burned his lips, cut off his ears and nose, and crushed his cheekbones so he could disguise himself as any individual.^{[ch. 24]} After the Bakumatsu, Han'nya received no prosperous government job offers because of his appearance.^{[ch. 28]}

Watsuki was originally going to base Han'nya off of the "Elephant Man"; intending for his face to be deformed because a person stepped on it while he was still in his mother's womb. Other people would have treated Han'nya like a monster and therefore he would have lived alone in the mountains until Aoshi finds him. Han'nya would join the Oniwabanshū, becoming a tragic figure who finds his raison d'être in fighting, saying "Only in the Oniwabanshū am I able to live as a human being." Watsuki and his editor discussed how this could be interpreted meaning "the shape of one's destiny is determined by how one is born" and whether or not this would be appropriate for a young men's magazine. Watsuki decided a change needed to be made and said that for him Han'nya was a difficult character as it made him aware of the responsibilities of writing for young people. Han'nya's personality is derived from Yamazaki Susumu, a member of the Shinsengumi. Some readers proposed that Han'nya had a handsome face under his mask, was Aoshi's kagemusha (such as his twin brother), or was a kunoichi. The design model for Han'nya was a human skeleton. His left and right eyes being two different shapes and sizes originates from the elephant man concept. Watsuki said that Han'nya is not a character one would describe as "evil." Han'nya came in fourteenth place in the series' third character popularity poll.

==== Shikijō ====
Voiced by: Kazuhiro Nakata (1996 series), Tetsu Inada (2023 series) (Japanese); Dean Elliot (1996 series), Imari Williams (2023 series) (English)

Shikijō (式尉) is the musclebound hand-to-hand fighter of the Oniwabanshū and was keeper of the Edo Castle gate.^{[ch. 24]} Prior to joining the Oniwabanshū, Shikijō was an onmitsu for the Ishin Shishi in the Satsuma Domain.^{[ch. 25]} In 1866, Shikijō infiltrated Edo Castle to gather information about an upcoming battle and was defeated by the thirteen-year-old Shinomori Aoshi, who created the scars covering Shikijō's body. Aoshi gave Shikijō a chance to join the Oniwabanshū and gain strength using their training methods and medicines.^{[ch. 25]} Shikijō received no prosperous government job offers because he was a traitor.^{[ch. 28]} Shikijō is mainly a hand-to-hand fighter but he also swings around a large ball and chain. He fights Sagara Sanosuke at Takeda Kanryū's mansion and is defeated. He is the first to die at Kanryū's hand, protecting Aoshi from the Gatling gun.^{[ch. 28]} Watsuki said that he modeled Shikijō after Sanosuke by giving Shikijō the same philosophy, strength, and personality. By putting them on opposite sides Watsuki intended to illustrate the differences between the two factions. Watsuki created Shikijō as a complete villain, but said that the "noble manner" of his death made the character "a pretty cool guy." The author used no specific model for Shikijō's design; giving him many muscles as the character is a "power fighter," but feeling that Shikijō was not sufficiently "strange-enough looking," Watsuki added scars and "superhero-like exaggerated musculature."

==== Okina ====
Voiced by: Koichi Kitamura (1996 series), Shigeru Chiba (2023 series) (Japanese); Michael McConnohie (1996 series), Marty Fleck (New Kyoto Arc), Christopher Corey Smith (2023 series) (English)

Kashiwazaki Nenji (柏崎 念至), also known as Okina (翁), was a member of the Oniwabanshū during the Bakumatsu. Sent to Kyoto to set up an information network, the Aoi-Ya inn became his headquarters.^{[ch. 74]} Although old, Okina still possesses a quick mind and knows all that goes on in Kyoto as the old intelligence network is still active.^{[ch. 74]} Okina was expected to become the next leader of the Oniwabanshū but refused the position, saying that it was the time for the younger generation, and recommended Aoshi.^{[ch. 75]} He uses his network to help Kenshin find Arai Seikū and Hiko Seijūrō.^{[ch. 74]} When Aoshi allows Shishio's men to attack Aoi-Ya, Okina challenges him to a duel for forgetting the dignity of the Oniwabanshū and becoming just another killer.^{[ch. 88]} Okina tends to like drinking games and pretty girls. He is often assisted by fellow ex-Oniwabanshū Kurojō (黒尉), Shirojō (白尉), Masukami (増髪) and Ōmime (近江女) who help run the Aoi-Ya, and look after Misao.^{[ch. 74]} He fights wielding steel tonfa to block sword blows.^{[ch. 89]}

Watsuki had no particular model for Okina's personality; Okina is his image of an "old soldier." Okina, a "gentle, run-down-at-the-seams" elderly man, summons his powers and corrects the younger generation when it is confused or does something wrong. Watsuki supposes that a bit of the character Kohei from Shōtarō Ikenami's Kenkyaku Shōbai is in Okina. The author said that he likes Okina since as a character he was able to "tie up loose ends." Okina's design model is Tokijirō Kaizō from Takeshi Obata's Cyborg Jii-chan G. Watsuki said that while he was careful to not make Okina look too similar to his influence, his assistants guessed the design model right away. He expressed disappointment with Okina's hair; he intended for it to stand up when Okina is very angry, making him resemble "Sally's dad from the anime." Because of a lack of available pages, Watsuki concluded "this hasn't ended up coming across too well." He is portrayed by Min Tanaka in the live-action films.

=== Geezer ===
"Geezer" (オイボレ, Oibore) is a friendly old man who resides within the Fallen Village. When Kenshin falls into a deep depression after he believes that he had failed to protect Kaoru from being killed by Enishi, Geezer gently persuades Kenshin (partly through the use of hakubaikō perfume) to find his purpose to stand again rather than listen to his friends telling him to avenge Kaoru, who mean well but lack the insight to realize what Kenshin's inner conflict is. He is then revealed to be the father of Yukishiro Tomoe and Enishi.^{[ch. 225]} He is aware that Tomoe has died and that Kenshin was her husband. Geezer is last seen with the broken Enishi in the Fallen Village; father and son remark that each other looks familiar, though it is left unknown whether either knows their connection.^{[ch. 251]}

Watsuki based Geezer off of an empty milk can who is a character in "Now go, Robot!," a story by Makoto Ōishi. The motif of the entire plotline involving Kenshin in the Fallen Village is based on that same story, with it also taking influence from the comic Silver Surfer by Moebius. Watsuki used no design model for Geezer. He was created simply based on the attributes; homeless, "an unusual personality," and not easily showing his true thoughts. Afterwards, Watsuki noticed that Geezer was very similar to Grandpa Bob in Hareluya II Boy by Haruto Umezawa.

=== Tsukayama Yutarō ===
Voiced by: Mayumi Tanaka (1996 series), Yūko Sanpei (2023 series) (Japanese); Michael Lindsay (1996 series; first voice), Brian Donovan (1996 series; second voice), Casey Mongillo (2023 series) (English)

Tsukayama Yutarō (塚山 由太郎) is a young boy and Isurugi Raijūta's "apprentice." Yutarō's father, Tsukayama Yuzaemon (塚山 由左衛門), is a former samurai who became rich by selling swords to Europeans. Yutarō feels that his father's actions degrade him and wants to show him how a true samurai lives by the sword.^{[ch. 38]} The Tsukayama family was deceived by Isurugi Raijūta, who faked a robbery so the Tsukayama family would pay him to teach Yutarō how to use swords.^{[ch. 41]} Yutarō trains at Kamiya dojo a little and becomes Myōjin Yahiko's rival, the two gaining a mutual desire to become better than the other. When Raijūta initiates a failed sneak attack on Kenshin's group, he accidentally slices Yutarō's right arm so that the nerves are severed, therefore making Yutarō unable to hold a sword with that hand.^{[ch. 41]} Yuzaemon takes Yutarō to Germany to get medical treatment. Before he leaves, however, Yahiko confronts him, scorns his sulking, and tells him that he can overcome his sorrow by working to be better than he imagined Raijuta to be. Yutaro responds that he will never stop practicing swordsmanship and his left arm is still enough to become great.^{[ch. 44]} At the end of the series, Yutarō's name is listed as one of the acting instructors of the Kamiya Kasshin-ryū dojo, along with Yahiko.^{[ch. 255]}

In the anime Yutarō's father, a well-known swordsman, is dead. Yutarō, who had inherited a lot of money after his parents died, wishes to learn swordsmanship to become as skilled as his father. When he sees Kenshin, he demands lessons on how to use a sword, but Kenshin refuses. Yutarō finds Raijūta, who plans to overthrow the Meiji government. During a scuffle one of Raijūta's men accidentally hits Yutarō, causing him to fall into the ocean. After Kenshin rescues him Yutaro gets to know Kenshin's group. In a similar manner Raijūta injures Yutarō's right arm, and Yutarō goes to Germany for medical treatment.

Watsuki created Yutarō as Yahiko's rival with no real model; while they both want to be stronger, their desires come the complete opposite places. He gave Yutarō the traits of admiring Kaoru, an older woman, and Kenshin's strength but made him unable to "be honest" about it because they were Raijūta's enemies, as aspects of his youth. Watsuki said that Yutarō is one of the "good guys" but because he was "brought down a bit" by the author's "most disgraceful character" (Raijūta) he may not have been developed "to his full extent." Yutarō's design is also the opposite of Yahiko. Watsuki initially had difficulty with his hair, but once he got used to it, it became easy and he enjoyed drawing it. He also had difficulty in compensating for Yutarō's black-less design on the page, which if he was not careful, would go all white. Yutarō came in eighth place in the series' first character popularity poll.

=== Ōkubo Toshimichi ===
Voiced by: Yoshisada Sakaguchi (1996 series), Takashi Matsuyama (2023 series) (Japanese); Doug Stone (1996 series), Luis Bermudez (2023 series) (English)

Ōkubo Toshimichi (大久保 利通), based on the historical figure of the same name, is the chief of the department of internal affairs, making him the most powerful man in Japan.^{[ch. 55]} One of the three great revolutionaries, he was a leader of the Satsuma clan, who supported the restoration of imperial power. Ōkubo appears, accompanied by superintendent general Kawaji Toshiyoshi (川路 利良), to inform Kenshin that Shishio Makoto has amassed an army and plots to overthrow the government. He asks Kenshin to go to Kyoto and kill Shishio for the sake of the country.^{[ch. 55]} Returning a week later for Kenshin's answer, Ōkubo is assassinated by Seta Sōjirō with seven Ishikawa Prefecture samurai taking responsibility.^{[ch. 56]}

Watsuki feels that many Japanese people have bias towards Saigō Takamori with Ōkubo being thought of as "sly" and "cunning." The author expressed disappointment in this and instead stated that while Ōkubo was indeed a strategist during the Bakumatsu, he was ethical during the Meiji era and did not try to enrich himself personally through politics (like Saigō did). Watsuki feels that Ōkubo, who had been demonized during his time period, is an example of what a politician should be and needs more appreciation from the population. For his design, Watsuki wanted to use portrait photographs of Ōkubo, but could not find them. So he tried using a statue as a model, but believes that the final product does not look at all similar to the statue. In retrospect he believes that the character resembles President of the United States Abraham Lincoln, another historical figure that Watsuki has respect for. He is portrayed by Kazufumi Miyazawa in the live-action films.

=== Himura Kenji ===
Voiced by: Yuki Kaida (Japanese); Joey Hood (English)

Himura Kenji (緋村 剣路) is the son of Kamiya Kaoru and Himura Kenshin that appears in the last chapter of the manga as a young child. Although he bears an uncanny resemblance to Kenshin, he is more fond of his mother and less caring towards his father (he has a habit of pulling Kenshin's hair).^{[ch. 255]} He also appears in the follow-up chapter Yahiko's Sakabatō, where he is about four years old and is seen training with a shinai.

Watsuki said that "stupid" was Kenji's personality model, and described him as equivalent to Arai Iori. The author said that Kenji exists solely to be the son of Kenshin and Kaoru, and even though the character was "cliché", he felt that Kenji had to appear. The author said that he is not "twisted enough" to place "negative elements in the ideal family." Kenji's character design is "a small Kenshin."

=== Tsukioka Tsunan ===
Voiced by: Hiroshi Yanaka (1996 series), Yūichirō Umehara (2023 series), Mariya Ise (child, 2023 series) (Japanese); Kim Strauss (1996 series), Sean Chiplock (2023 series), Amber Lee Connors (child, 2023 series) (English)

Tsukioka Tsunan (月岡 津南), born Katsuhiro (克浩), is a popular nishiki-e painter. Like Sanosuke, he was a child soldier of the Sekihō Army.^{[ch. 45]} For the past ten years he has cursed the Meiji government and created a cache of grenades to blow up the department of internal affairs.^{[ch. 46]} He recruits Sanosuke and they embark on their terrorist attack, but are stopped by Kenshin. After Kenshin buries his bombs, Tsukioka stops painting and starts his own newspaper to report the government's wrongdoings.^{[ch. 47]} However, he still makes bombs solely as protection and gave several to Sanosuke just before he followed Kenshin to Kyoto.^{[ch. 58, 101]} In the anime series, he becomes a valuable source of information for Kenshin and Sanosuke, serving as their intelligence source during the Feng Shui arc.

Watsuki said that Tsunan originated from a fake advertisement within the series, labeled "Mysterious Artist Appears." When he decided to do the extra Sanosuke chapters he created a "comrade from the Sekihō Army — lone explosive expert plotting overthrow of the government." But felt that this alone did not give Tsunan "interesting" qualities, so he added the "fake artist" trait. Due to exhaustion and scheduling issues, the arc became three chapters instead of the planned four and Watsuki said some parts did not get fully developed as a result. The author expressed a desire to use Tsunan at a later point in the series since he is the sole character with a "mass media" connection and therefore could have further uses. Despite the fact that Tsunan is "a little depressing," Watsuki likes Tsunan's "straightforward personality." Tsunan had no design model. Due to a lack of time Watsuki adapted an earlier concept of a man with dreadlocks, which "to my surprise, turned out to be just right." After making some "tweaks" the design assembled "quickly," with the bandanna and the "oddly patterned" jacket added to give him "artist-y" clothing.

=== Mishima Eiji ===
Voiced by: Naomi Matamura (1996 series), Shōya Chiba (2023 series) (Japanese); Joshua Seth (1996 series), Griffin Burns (2023 series) (English)

Mishima Eiji (三島 栄次) is a young boy from Shingetsu village who wants to take revenge against Shishio's forces for killing his brother and parents.^{[ch. 68]} Saitō Hajime sent Eiji's brother to Shingetsu to investigate the incidents there, hoping that he would not raise suspicion; his cover was blown, and he failed to save his parents.^{[ch. 67]} Kenshin defeats Senkaku, Shishio's man in charge of the village, and Shishio and his forces leave. Eiji tries to kill the unconscious Senkaku with a sword, but Saitō stops him so the police can question Senkaku.^{[ch. 71]} When Eiji insists that Senkaku needs to be killed for his family's honor, Kenshin tells him that his dead family wants him to be happy, not for him to kill someone. Saitō arranges for his wife, Tokio (時尾), to care for Eiji in the near future.^{[ch. 71]} Watsuki created Eiji between the tragedy in Shingetsu village and the concept of a new beginning, and with the main theme of revenge. In retrospect, the author said that the plot pulled Eiji around and therefore could not develop as a character. Watsuki felt the design looked too similar to Yahiko.

=== Sagara Sōzō ===
Voiced by: Hidehiro Kikuchi (1996 series), Daisuke Ono (2023 series) (Japanese); Steve Cannon (1996 series), Stephen Fu (2023 series) (English)

Sagara Sōzō (相楽 総三), based on the historical figure of the same name, was the captain of the Sekihō Army's first unit. As a child soldier underneath Sōzō, Sanosuke looked up to him greatly; hence he took Sōzō's family name as his own and became Sagara Sanosuke.^{[ch. 7]} Supporters of the revolution, the Sekihō Army traveled the countryside spreading news about the upcoming change of regime, such as tax cuts. The Meiji government could not keep the promise and so used the Sekihō Army as scapegoats, denouncing them as a "false army."^{[ch. 7]} Sōzō was decapitated when he reported to the commanding general and his head was placed on a platform in a cage for all to see,^{[ch. 7]} haunting Sanosuke for many years and causing his embitterment towards the Meiji government. In the anime, Sōzō died of fatal gunshot wounds while protecting Sanosuke.

Although a historical figure, Watsuki's own mental image of Sagara Sōzō ended up taking precedence; according to the author, Sōzō genuinely wanted equality for Japan's people. With him being depicted within the framework of Sanosuke's memories, Sōzō ends up being glorified in the story. Watsuki debated whether to include the Sekihō Army Incident due to its obscurity. But because he believed that it exposed the truths and lies of the Meiji Restoration, he decided to include it. He did say that the series' popularity fell to its lowest point during this storyline, as of Rurouni Kenshin volume two, but repeated that leaving it out was not an option. With no actual historic photographs of Sōzō to use as a design, the character became popular "in the eyes (and hearts) of female readers." Sagara came in sixth place in the series' first character popularity poll and eleventh in both the second and third.

=== Arai Family ===
The Arai Family consists of the blacksmith Arai Seikū (新井 青空), his wife Azusa (梓), and their infant son Iori (伊織). Seikū's father Shakkū (赤空) was the swordsmith who made Kenshin's sakabatō. Kenshin seeks Shakkū out in Kyoto for a replacement and learns he is dead, but that his son is still alive and learned everything he knew. With his sakabatō broken, Kenshin asks Seikū to make a new sword, but Seikū refuses because he wants to live a peaceful life in the Meiji era and does not want to make any more weapons.^{[ch. 75]} Wanting Shakkū's final sword, Sawagejō Chō kidnaps Iori and uses him as a hostage until Azusa reveals that it was offered to the Hakusan Shrine as a "godsword."^{[ch. 77]} With Kenshin about to lose to Chō without a sword, Seikū entrusts his father's last sword to Kenshin, who immediately uses it to defeat Chō; to everyone's surprise the sword is also a sakabatō.^{[ch. 80, 81]}

Watsuki said that he had "lots of different things in my mind" when he created the family, but that he forgot many of them. He said that Iori symbolizes peace, Seikū demonstrates selfishness demonstrated by fathers, and Azusa "uh... holds it all together?" Iori's design originated from "a fairly famous women's manga involving babies." Watsuki said that he created the father and mother "on the spot." Watsuki felt that Seikū's design in the end "kind of" looked similar to Takeda Kanryū, and so concluded that the design "didn't turn out quite right." But admitted that he also initially thought Azusa was "not quite right" until changing his mind, feeling "she's a really good character." The author added that he found it "refreshing" that Azusa is the first female character he designed who shows her entire forehead. Watsuki was planning to have Seikū's family reappear later in the Kyoto arc with Yahiko as the lead character in the story. Iori tied with Jin-e for eighteenth place in the series' second character popularity poll.

=== Higashidani Family ===
Sanosuke's father and younger siblings in Shinshū, who he left ten years before the series. His father, Higashidani Kamishimoemon (東谷 上下ェ門), is a farmer adept at fighting with his fists and who has fended off Fudōsawa from taking over the village. Uki (右喜) is his younger sister, and Ōta (央太) is his younger brother.^{[ch. 229]} Their mother, Naname (菜々芽), died around two years after the birth of Ōta due to a cold.^{[ch. 231]} Uki became protective of her little brother because Sanosuke left them and because her mother died, so she was afraid of losing other family members.^{[ch. 234]} As a result, Ōta was sheltered. After learning about Sanosuke's deeds Ōta becomes willing to fight. At the end of the series, Ōta's name is listed as a student at Kaoru's dojo.^{[ch. 255]}

Watsuki said that he always had some idea of what Sanosuke's family would be like, and therefore formed the Higashidani family along those concepts. Kamishimoemon is what Sanosuke will be like when he is older, Uki is very "lively" and protective of others, and Ōta is the opposite of Sanosuke, a weak little boy. Watsuki felt that the story was a little unsatisfactory because he was tired from the previous storyline and therefore unable to concentrate. In retrospect, he said he should have chosen either Uki or Ōta and made it only a three-person family. However, the author said that illustrating the family was fun and that he liked challenging himself with a whole family. Watsuki had no models for the visual designs of the characters. Kamishimoemon originated from a concept of an aged Sanosuke that was considered for the final Rurouni Kenshin chapter. He described Uki as just a "modern, easy to draw type." Ōta is a "typical Watsuki image" of a weak child from a rural area who has cheeks with circle marks. Watsuki intended for designs that would be drawn quickly, but found it difficult and as they evolved he decided that he needed to study images of real people.

=== Oguni Gensai ===
Voiced by: Yoku Shioya (1996 series), Yōhei Tadano (2023 series) (Japanese); Steve Kramer (1996 series), Cam Clarke (2023 series) (English)

Oguni Gensai (小国 玄斎) is the doctor who takes Megumi as his live-in assistant.^{[ch. 30]} In the 1996 anime series, he appears more often and has two grandchildren, Ayame (あやめ) and Suzume (すずめ). In the Sony English dub of the 1996 series, the "g" in Gensai is pronounced as a "soft" g.

=== Tani Jūsanrō ===
Voiced by: Koichi Kitamura (1996 series), Yasuhiro Mamiya (2023 series) (Japanese); Tony Pope (1996 series) (English)

Tani Jūsanrō (谷 十三郎) is a politician in the Army Ministry and a former member of the Ishin Shishi. Tani is wealthy, pompous and self-centered. Kurogasa marks him as an assassination target, but Kenshin and Sanosuke successfully defend Tani.^{[ch. 9, 10]} Later in the series, Tani and Sanosuke get into an altercation; Tani, the uncle of Fudōsawa, supports his nephew taking over Sanosuke's hometown.^{[ch. 231]} After Sanosuke defeats Fudōsawa and his army, he goes to Tani's residence, defeating the Hiruma brothers, who act as Tani's bodyguards, before injuring Tani.^{[ch. 234]}

== Minor characters ==
Yamagata Aritomo (山縣 有朋)
Voiced by: Seiji Mizutani (1996 series; first voice), Hari Kaneko (1996 series; second voice), Mitsuru Ogata (2023 series) (Japanese); Simon Prescott (1996 series; first voice), Crispin Freeman (1996 series; second voice), Bill Harwell (Samurai X: The Motion Picture), Rick Zieff (2023 series) (English)
Based on the historical figure of the same name, is the general of the Japanese Army's ground troops and former general of the Kiheitai.^{[ch. 2]} For the last ten years Yamagata has looked for his former comrade Kenshin. When he finally finds him he asks Kenshin to stop carrying a sword and join him and other former comrades, but is turned down.^{[ch. 2]} In the anime, he appears again as the assassination target of a corrupt politician, Takuma Hashizume, but thanks to Kenshin, he was saved and Hashizume was arrested. Later in the anime, he alerts Kenshin about an assassination attempt led by Ukyo Inagi. Yamagata also plays an important role in the anime's Feng Shui arc assisting Kawaji and Tsunan with stopping the plot to destroy the Circle of Eternity. Watsuki said that he could not get his version of Yamagata to resemble surviving photographs of the real Yamagata. He is portrayed by Eiji Okuda in the live-action film.
Maekawa Miyauchi (前川 宮内)
Voiced by: Masaki Terasoma (2023 series) (Japanese); Aaron LaPlante (2023 series) (English)
The master of the Chūetsu-ryū style.^{[ch. 34]} Kaoru occasionally trains/teaches at his dojo, which has increased the school's enrollment numbers.^{[ch. 34]} Isurugi Raijūta appears at Maekawa's dojo and defeats him in a match, but Kenshin prevents Raijūta from mortally wounding Maekawa and burning the dojo sign.^{[ch. 35, 36]} However, it is stated that Maekawa was closing the dojo because of the loss.^{[ch. 37]} Later, Inui Banjin and Gein attack the dojo, but their bomb only partially destroys it thanks to Sanosuke.^{[ch. 161]} Maekawa does not blame Kenshin, but decides to retire and choose a young successor.^{[ch. 182]}
Shibumi (渋海)
Voiced by: Masaru Ikeda (1996 series), Isamu Yūsen (2023 series) (Japanese); Steve Kramer (1996 series) (English)
The corrupt secretary of the senate who employs assassins to eliminate rivals in order to further his own career. He employs Udō Jin-e, Akamatsu Arundo, and Saitō Hajime.^{[ch. 49]} Shibumi orders Saitō to kill Kenshin, not knowing that Saitō is in actuality allied to Ōkubo Toshimichi. After Saitō appears at Shibumi's place and kills Arundo, Shibumi begs for his life and offers money to Saitō; Saitō refuses and kills Shibumi.^{[ch. 55]}
Katsura Kogorō (桂 小五郎)
Voiced by: Tomokazu Seki (Trust & Betrayal), Kenichi Suzumura (2023 series) (Japanese); Corey M. Gagne (Trust & Betrayal), Ricco Fajardo (2023 series) (English)
Based on the historical figure of the same name, was the leader of the Chōshū Ishin Shishi and one of the three great revolutionaries.^{[ch. 166]} He assigns Kenshin as a Hitokiri in Kyoto.^{[ch. 166]} Katsura later has Shishio Makoto succeed Kenshin as Hitokiri and moves Kenshin to the front lines in order to use him to protect the revolutionaries and the new era, instead of to destroy the old one.^{[ch. 179]} He is portrayed by Ichirōta Miyagawa in the first live-action film and Issey Takahashi in the fifth live-action film.
Takasugi Shinsaku (高杉 晋作)
Voiced by: Wataru Takagi (Trust & Betrayal) (Japanese); Jason Phelps (Trust & Betrayal) (English)
Based on the historical figure of the same name, was the second in command of the Chōshū Ishin Shishi and founder of the Kiheitai, which initially recruited Kenshin.^{[ch. 166]} He led the Chōshū to victory in the Second Chōshū Subjugation, but died two years later without seeing the Revolution succeed.^{[ch. 180]} He is portrayed by Masanobu Ando in the live-action film.

=== 1996 anime-only characters ===
==== Shura ====
Voiced by: Kazue Itō (Japanese); Mary Elizabeth McGlynn (English)

Shura (朱羅) is the daughter of the former leader of the Kairyu Pirates, who were poor villagers dedicated to robbing only from the corrupted wealthy people. After her father's death, she succeeded him in leader, and continued his legacy of robbing only the corrupt. During one raid, some pirates wanted to kidnap Kaoru but Shura did not accept that because of her belief that the Kairyu do not harm woman or children, so she took Kenshin to free Kaoru. Due to Shura's strictness and honor-bound rules, along with the fact that she is a woman, she became very unpopular amongst the crew, with the exception of two, Sarujiro and Iwazo. As a result, the rest of them chose Ginjo, one member who allied with an opium dealer (Senbonya Yohei) they once robbed, as their new leader, and attempted to kill Shura in mutiny after adding firearms in their dealings. Shura returned, and with the help of Kenshin, defeated her wayward crew, and with Sarujiro and Iwazo, she left to the sea, as they were still criminals. Shura fought with a three-section staff that can disconnect into a chain-staff, and has great agility and reflexes. She might have developed feelings for Kenshin.

==== Amakusa Shōgo ====
Voiced by: Junichi Inoue (Japanese); Crispin Freeman (English)

Amakusa Shōgo (天草 翔伍), real name Mutō Shōgo (武藤 翔伍), was taught Hiten Mitsurugi by his uncle. Shogo is also a Christian, and sought revenge for Christianity, and to make the Holy Land, after his parents were killed for their beliefs, when Christians were persecuted during the Shogunate. He mastered "God Speed" by the age of 14, and according to Kenshin, had surpassed even God Speed. His followers believe that he is the "Son of God". Some of his "miracles" were really just due to his education in Western Medicine, and other sciences.

==== Lady Magdalia ====
Voiced by: Hiroko Kasahara (Japanese); Lia Sargent (English)

Lady Magdalia (マグダリア, Magudaria), real name Mutō Sayo (武藤 小夜), is Shogo Amakusa's younger sister. She serves as a holy mother to their crowd of followers and a teacher to the young children. She has suffered from consumption ever since she was a child (which she perhaps obtained from her mother, who suffered the same illness). She is often seen accompanied by Shozo, a childhood friend whom she and her brother saved from persecution. Magdalia is a devout Christian and believes in everything that her brother says and does, which leads to her and Sanosuke Sagara having clashing personalities. Her most prized possession is her mother's holy medallion which is lost and eventually returned to her by Sanosuke. She comes to respect him and wishes that she had met someone like him earlier in life so that she could have had a more open heart to those outside her faith. She is shot as she protects the Dutch consul, who can save her townspeople, and refuses to be treated in the hope that the people she cares for will be saved. She dies in Sanosuke's arms after telling him her real name. Shogo promises to make her dreams of a land of equality and peace a reality.

=== Rurouni Kenshin: Restoration characters ===
Elder Peaberry (エルダー・ピーベリー, Erudā Pīberī)
Voiced by: Kanae Itō (Japanese); Jeannie Tirado (English)
Asahiyama Dankichi (朝日山男吉)
Voiced by: Tomoaki Maeno (Japanese); Ricco Fajardo (English)
Espiral Rotation (エスピラール・ロタシオン, Esupirāru Rotashion)
Voiced by: Shin-ichiro Miki (Japanese); Stephen Fu (English)
Ishizu Deian (石津泥庵)
Voiced by: Naomi Kusumi (Japanese); David Lodge (English)
