= Takeda Kanryūsai =

Japanese samurai

Takeda Kanryūsai (武田 観柳斎, 1830 or 1834 – died June 22, 1867) was the captain of the fifth unit of the Shinsengumi, a special police force for the Tokugawa regime.

== Background ==
He was a samurai born in Izumo, in the late Edo period. Born Fukuda Hiroshi in Izumo (modern day Shimane Prefecture, in the Chūgoku region), it's said that Takeda wanted to become a doctor in his youth. However, he left his clan to study the Koushuu Nagamuna style of military strategy in Edo. While there, he became close to the well-known Takeda family and was adopted by them, taking the name Takeda Kanryūsai. This branch of the Takeda clan were hereditary Aizu vassals, although Takeda Kanryūsai was a well-known antibakufu activist involved with the Tengu-tou.

Little is known of Takeda Kanryūsai's life before joining the Shinsengumi, but he was likely involved in academics and medicine. His sword style was most likely Hokushin Ittō-ryū, although he does not appear to have been very skilled. He was close to the influential loyalist Hirano Kuniomi. However, he was too outspoken an advocate of sonnō jōi and was arrested. He escaped imprisonment in 1863 and fled to Kyoto to join the Shinsengumi.

== Shinsengumi period ==
Somehow he had been acquainted with Kondō Isami in Edo and joined his group early in the winter of 1863 or 1864, at age 30. He was appointed to a management position as a fukuchō's assistant based on his credentials in military strategy. There, he ingratiated himself to Kondō with cheap flattery and was despised by most of the other members.

Takeda was assigned to assist in the arrest of Furutaka Shuntaro (also known as Masuya Kiemon), which lead to the Ikedaya Affair. He was a member of Kondō's group and helped to secure the perimeter of Ikedaya. Takeda participated in the indoor battle after the arrival of Hijikata's group, bringing down the ceiling and killing a Tosa rōnin. He received a 20 ryō bonus for valor in combat. Soon after, he was sent as an officer to the Akebono restaurant to investigate reports that it harbored rōnin from Nagato. The investigation led to the seppuku suicide of a Tosa samurai and the Aizu retainer who had wounded him, an incident known as the Akebono Restaurant Affair.

When Nagakura Shinpachi and others petitioned the Aizu clan on account of Kondō's allegedly despotic leadership, Takeda attempted to mediate between the two sides. After that, he turned to military affairs such as increasing the ranks of the Shinsengumi. In September he accompanied Kondō to Edo as his secretary; in November, he went to Nagato as a military adviser. He outranked military adviser Itō Kashitaro at the time. However, the Shinsengumi were beginning to adopt more Western military techniques based on the French army by the time of Itō Kashitaro's enlistment, which rendered Takeda's Koushuu style obsolete. However, a clever appeal to Kondō earned Takeda the position of fifth Unit Captain in 1865. He also taught strategy and tactics.

But Itō Kashitaro's excellence in academics and martial arts was not ignored by Kondō, no matter how fond he was of his sycophant, Takeda. Takeda was left off an 1866 business trip to Hiroshima in favor of the other military adviser. In desperation, he sought whatever allies he could.

== Death ==
Takeda approached Itō about forming a separate party within the Shinsengumi, but Ito refused only to do exactly that in 1867. Even without Itō's support, Takeda ambitiously planned to leave the Shinsengumi, contact Satsuma and start a new movement to overthrow the shōgun. Although he had previously been loyal to Kondō, it is said that he was offered a large sum of money to leave. He obtained permission to leave the Shinsengumi and return to Izumo – however, the Shinsengumi's extensive network of informants discovered his secret communications with Satsuma.

There are conflicting accounts of how and when Takeda was killed. The first is that he was assassinated on the 28th day, ninth month, of the year Keiō 2 (November 5, 1866), on his way back from Izumo. He was making his way across the Zenitori Bridge of the Taketa Highway in Fushimi when he was confronted by Saitō Hajime and Shinohara Tainoshin. Saitō Hajime is often credited with the kill, although Shinohara is said to be the true assassin. The other story is that he was not murdered until the 22nd day, sixth month, in the year Keiō 3 (July 23, 1867), on his way home along that highway from a farewell party organised by Kondō. He had obtained permission to leave, but the Shinsengumi secretly plotted against him. He may have also attempted to join Itō's group at this time, but was turned down. He then intended to join Satsuma. Saitō, and sometimes Shinohara, are usually credited in this version of the assassination as well, but they had both left the Shinsengumi months earlier as a part of Itō's group. There is much unresolved confusion over when exactly Takeda left the Shinsengumi and when his treachery was discovered. The 1867 date is more widely used.

== Character ==
Takeda was a tall man with cropped hair. He was known to have been strict to subordinates that he seemed to wish to reduce them to tears, while fawning over superiors. Takeda was also said to be homosexual. Homosexuality was discouraged within the Shinsengumi for the violent love triangles it often generated. Takeda did not have any recorded liaisons with women, and several recruits apparently complained of harassment.

The novelist Shimozawa Kan writes in his "Shinsengumi Monogatari" that Takeda had been harassing a beautiful young boy, Magoshi Saburō, but that Magoshi rejected him and appealed to Hijikata. It happened that Magoshi also saw Takeda leaving the Satsuma estate and reported such to Kondō. However, since Magoshi left the Shinsengumi three years before Takeda's assassination, this is probably untrue. However, Takeda did not have an attractive personality to either sex. He largely avoided the dirty work of the Shinsengumi and concentrated on pandering to his superiors. Kondō found him to be educated and erudite, and was impressed with his skills in strategy and medicine, but obviously his opinion of Takeda changed. Takeda's decision to join Satsuma was probably motivated less by political aspirations than by greed. Unlike Itō, he lacked the charisma to successfully create a separatist group, and is remembered as a rather pathetic villain.

His grave-site is just outside the Jutoku-ji Temple boundary in Takinogawa, Kita-ku, Tokyo.

== In fiction ==
- Rurouni Kenshin author Nobuhiro Watsuki cites Takeda Kanryūsai as the inspiration for a character by the name of Takeda Kanryū.
- A fictional version of Takeda also appears in visual novel Hakuoki by Otomate. He appears in the enhanced PS Vita port version of the game. He is depicted as arrogant and greedy captain of the Shinsengumi who aims to become Kondo's close aide. He serves as the main antagonist in Hachiro Iba's route.
