= Enzai: Falsely Accused =

2002 video game

- Enzai
- Cover art for the American Release

冤罪
- Video game
- Developer: Langmaor
- Publisher: JP: Langmaor; NA: JAST USA
- Genre: Visual novel
- Platform: Windows
- Released: JP: September 13, 2002; NA: January 25, 2006
- Original video animation
- Directed by: Toshiyuki Sakurai; Kinomi Noguchi
- Produced by: Koichi Murakami; Okabo Doji
- Written by: Hikaru Takeuchi
- Studio: Adonis; Japan Home Video
- Released: April 23, 2004 – October 22, 2004
- Runtime: 30 minutes per episode
- Episodes: 2

Enzai (冤罪; lit. "False charge") is an adult yaoi game made by the Japanese software house Langmaor, which was later translated to English under the title Enzai – Falsely Accused. It was the first yaoi game released commercially in the United States. The game is also the first that Langmaor developed.

== Plot ==
The story is set in post-revolutionary France in early 19th-century. Although the specific date is never given, Napoleon is still Emperor. One character remarks that it is several years before the 20th anniversary of the French Revolution, placing the game's events in the years before 1809.

The protagonist is Guys, a young boy from a poor family, who gets caught stealing candy from a Paris store. However, after being railroaded by a city detective named Guildias, Guys finds himself accused, convicted, and sentenced to life imprisonment for the murder of a man he never met.

From that point on, most of Enzai takes place inside a dark, claustrophobic, dirty prison. In there, Guys experiences humiliation and torture of various kinds, much of it involving rape.

The primary goal of the game is for the player (as Guys) to locate evidence and witnesses that can exonerate him of the murder, unveil the true killer, and get him released from prison. Secondary goals include learning the killer's true motives, finding out the backstory of the murder, keeping Guys both physically and psychologically healthy, and forming a romantic bond with other male NPCs in the prison.

== Gameplay ==
Game interaction is extremely limited, as Enzai is a visual novel. Most of Enzai's gameplay consists of reading text and seeing stationary artwork. Player input is limited to, at a few junctions in the story, the ability to choose one of two paths. The choices selected affect which ending the player gets. The nature of the gameplay, and the incomplete revelation of the aspects of the main conspiracy, means the player doesn't find out the entire conspiracy until they have completed all endings and unlocked all the scenes.

While there are eleven endings, only seven of these are "official" endings that can be unlocked and re-experienced in the option menu.

There are, in fact, two unrelated conspiracies—one with Durer, Bollanet, and most of the prisoners, and another involving Guys, Guildias, and his imprisonment. In the game, it appears that Durer is aware that Guys is innocent, and that Guildias is corrupt, and vice versa. Durer and Guildias thus are partners in the evil prison system.

The game has a number of possible endings, some where Guys dies in unsuccessful attempts to escape from prison, some where he succeeds in proving his innocence, as well as endings where he remains in prison for life.

== Characters ==
The characters of Enzai are mostly Guys' fellow prisoners, guards, or other law enforcement officials. Nearly all the characters have personality disorders or paraphilias.

If successful (or lucky), the player uncovers the fact that almost all the prisoners are somehow connected to a larger conspiracy, and have apparently been arrested and thrown into prison to be permanently silenced.

Guys (ガイズ, Gaizu) – Voiced by: Tatsuki Amano

The protagonist and the player character, he has been convicted for a murder he did not commit, as part of a conspiracy he knows nothing about. He is described as a street kid and part of a gang who is constantly committing minor crimes such as shoplifting. He is raped often while in prison. During sex scenes, Guys tends to show signs of masochism. At the beginning of the story, Guys claims to be heterosexual, but when he has sexual encounters with other male characters, he becomes aroused and seems embarrassed by this.

Guildias (ギルディアス, Girudiasu) – Voiced by: Katsuaki Arima

The detective who arrests Guys and has him charged with murder. He regularly visits, tortures, and rapes Guys in the prison. As the game progresses, Guildias is gradually revealed to have framed Guys for murder because of a (false) fear that Guys witnessed him kidnapping another character, Muca. Guildias is also the real killer of the man Guys has been accused of murdering. To win, Guys and his friends must uncover enough evidence both to link him with the murder and establish, absolutely, Guys' inability to have committed the murder. If this happens, Guildias loses control over his sanity in open court, and is dragged away in front of the judge and audience.

Durer (デューラ, Dyūra) – Voiced by: Kazuya Sugisaki

A sadistic prison warden who regularly rapes, humiliates, and tortures the prisoners, especially Guys and Vallewida. His father, Bollanet, is a highly placed governmental official, which protects him from retribution – most of the prisoners under Durer's care end up dying under mysterious circumstances. He is introduced near the very beginning of the game; the first adult scene involves him performing a cavity search upon Guys. In one ending, when Guys fails to stand up to Durer and other sadistic officials, he becomes Durer's "sex slave." In another, Guys – along with Vallewida and Evan – are all murdered by Durer to cover up a conspiracy. If the conspiracy is uncovered, Durer is (presumably) arrested with the others.

Bollanet (ボルアネ, Boruane) – Voiced by: Hiroomi Sugino

Durer's father and a governmental official. He performs various sex acts on Guys and Vallewida during the game. Bollanet can be exposed as the head of an extremely large conspiracy, in which, as an officer in the French army, he abused his position, apparently ordered innocent civilians killed, and stole wheat from the poor to smuggle and sell on the black market. Guildias and Durer aided him by arresting and, once in prison, killing any possible witness to his acts.

Evan (エバ, Eba) – Voiced by: Kazuya Ichijō

An unusually upbeat prisoner, Evan is revealed to be a successful journalist who, with the aid of an attorney friend, exposed much corruption in post-revolutionary France. Unlike most other prisoners, he has been sentenced to a relatively light prison term of a few years. While Evan offers a number of reasons for his imprisonment, if the conspiracy is uncovered, it is revealed he was framed by Bollanet after he found out too much about his smuggling operations. For this knowledge, he has been marked for death. Evan must be befriended by Guys to proceed in the game – his friendship is necessary to gain the attorney Lusca's attention, and to gain logical deductions that help exonerate Guys. In one ending, he and Guys become lovers, and Evan decides to stay out of journalism for a while, instead working with Guys as a construction worker.

Jose (ジョゼ, Joze) – Voiced by: Bakuhatsu Fuji

A violent young man who was imprisoned for raping a nun while under the influence of alcohol. He often tries to rape Guys, and the game is full of tricks and betrayals by which Jose tries to lure Guys into a compromising position. He is usually accompanied by another prisoner, Io, whom he treats like a sex slave. It is revealed that Jose was part of a street gang that aided the man Guys is accused of murdering. This man (Jared) was a private detective who was investigating Guildias for a kidnapping. Jose's "gang" affiliation strongly resembles that between Edogawa Rampo's Kogoro Akechi and his Boy Detective Club (which was in turn based on Sherlock Holmes and the Baker Street Irregulars). Although he is illiterate, Jose has Jared's diary in his possession, and is willing to part with it if Guys is willing to have sex with him. This diary is essential in proving that Guildias is the real killer and exonerating Guys. In one ending Guys and Jose become lovers, and Jose decides to pursue a career as a private detective with Guys as his assistant.

Lusca (ルスカ, Rusuka) – Voiced by: Kōichi Sera

A lawyer hired by Guys' family, primarily because he is an alcoholic and, as such, came cheap. Guys' family gave him enough money to visit Guys in prison 12 times, after which he feels no duty to help Guys anymore. Although Lusca initially appears to be incompetent and uncaring, if Guys befriends Evan, it will be revealed that Lusca was once a respected and intelligent attorney who later turned to drinking. Unless Guys gets this information, Lusca will lose interest in the case, and a bad ending will ensue. Lusca and Evan were once close friends who helped each other in their respective professions (it is suggested that the two once had a romantic relationship, but Evan broke it off to protect Lusca from any association with him). If reminded of this, Lusca will take Guys' case seriously and work on gathering evidence and witnesses. It is possible for Guys to form a close relationship with Lusca. In one ending, Guys will be killed while trying to escape on New Year's Eve, but Lusca will be with him at his death and later vow to find justice. In another, after his exoneration, Guys will move in with Lusca and become his assistant and lover.

Vallewida (ヴァルイーダ, Varuīda) – Voiced by: Risato Habuki

A former soldier, Vallewida is a strange character who apparently has more than one personality, and seems unusually remorseful and resigned to his imprisonment. He also apparently suffers from amnesia, and cannot even remember the crime that sent him to prison. He is regularly raped and abused by both Durer and Bollanet. Although Vallewida offers several excuses for his unusual behaviour (including an imaginary addiction to opium), if the conspiracy is revealed, it turns out that, while in the army, he witnessed Bollanet's smuggling operations, and has evidence that proves this, despite attempts by Bollanet to beat the information out of him. If the player uncovers these facts, the reason for Vallewida's depression and remorse become clear – although he was just following orders, he still feels guilty for helping Bollanet while serving under his command.

Vallewida has different personality modes which appear throughout the game. In his "default" extremely passive personality, he appears to be an intellectual, religious person who spends much time reading in his cell. While in this state, he tends to be extremely friendly and polite, and often treats Guys in a sympathetic (and loving) manner. During certain circumstances, Vallewida goes into what Guys refers to as his "ghost mode." In this state, he is almost catatonic, and does not seem to be aware of where or who he is. He usually enters this state during and after being sexually abused and tortured by Durer or Bollanet. In this state, he is uncommunicative and masochistic, and does not resist Durer or Bollanet's treatment. If a person he cares for is being harmed, Vallewida can become extremely protective and violent. When this happens, his personality becomes extremely cold and methodical, and he regains the ability to fight back. In this state, he is revealed to be an adept swordsman. For a "good" ending, Guys must befriend Vallewida enough to get his logical deduction and knowledge of sword wounds to prove his innocence. In one ending, he and Guys fall in love. After Guys is released, he leaves Paris and works at a small town grocery store until Vallewida comes back to him.

Io (イオ, Io) – Voiced by: Ran Hazuki

An easily-bullied, small, and young prisoner, Io is Jose's prison "slave," and as such, is constantly being abused. He will always follow Jose's orders. Despite his passive demeanor, it is revealed that Io is a murderer, and his insight is necessary for Guys' defense. Evan constantly protects Io, often treating him like a "little brother".

Shion (シオン, Shion) – Voiced by: Kōichi Yamaga

Shion is a hidden character that Guys can only meet him after the default ending is unlocked. An orphan, he suffers from extreme guilt after he accidentally dropped a toolbox on a friend's head, killing him. In his ending, all the other surviving prisoners are released (though no explanation is provided in the game), and Shion and Guys open a restaurant where the characters have a reunion.

Belbet (ベルベット, Berubetto) – Voiced by: Pal Hazuki

An apparently insane prisoner who has been in prison for several years. He claims to be royalty and the long-lost heir to the French throne. Although he appears extremely menacing, he tends to be gentle and is obsessed with chocolate. In several endings, it is revealed that Belbet was faking his madness.

Muca (ミュカ, Myuka) – Voiced by: Misumi

While he never appears (alive) in the game, Muca is a bishōnen who attracted the attention of Guys and other boys long before the game started. According to Guys, Muca looked so much like an attractive girl that he proposed to him as a small child. The game will be revealed that Guildias kidnapped Muca during Thanksgiving and later dressed him like a girl. Guys saw Guildias with Muca, and Guildias (incorrectly) assumed that Guys recognized him. Afterwards, Muca's family hired the private detective Jared to find him. However, Guildias murdered Jared and framed Guys for the murder, thus covering his tracks and setting Enzai's plot in motion. In all scenarios, Guys will implore Lusca to try to find Muca before Guildias does anything to him. However, in the "default" good ending – the ending to scenarios in which Guys is exonerated, but fails to form any romantic ties – it will be revealed that Guildias strangled Muca to death. This ending is the only one that makes any mention of Muca; no other ending suggests that he was found before Guildias kills him.

== Reception ==
Enzai has become a successful franchise in Japan, birthing a two-episode OVA, several drama CD Collections, a novelization, an official fanbook, and a variety of fan collectibles (pin badges, phone cards, satchels, etc.).

Enzai has also become famous outside Japan, mostly due to its unusually dark and twisted atmosphere, deep and compelling plot, and surprisingly graphic scenes. Enzai is the first girls-oriented video game depicting blood, rape, insanity, and abuse rather than the more standard romantic "shōjo" scenes.

Enzai was refused classification by the Australian Communications and Media Authority because of sexual violence involving a person who is, or appears to be, a child under 18 years.
