= Yūsei Oda =

Japanese voice actor (born 1969)

- 織田 優成
- Born: 有馬 克明 (Katsuaki Arima); September 19, 1969 (age 56); Miyagi Prefecture, Japan
- Occupation: voice actor
- Years active: 1992–present

Yūsei Oda (織田 優成, Oda Yūsei; born September 19, 1969, as Katsuaki Arima (有馬 克明, Arima Katsuaki)) is a Japanese voice actor from Sendai, Miyagi Prefecture, Japan.

== Filmography ==
=== Anime ===
- Ranma ½ (1994), Herb
- Magic User's Club (1996), Akane's Boyfriend No.1; Akane's Boyfriend No.2
- Vision of Escaflowne (1996), Adjutant; Dalet; Soldier; Zaibach Soldier
- Sorcerer Hunters (1996), Sono Nii (ep 22)
- Birdy the Mighty (1996), Mori
- Hareluya II Boy (1997), Makoto Ichijou
- Haunted Junction (1997), Haruto Houjo
- Eat-Man '98 (1998), soldier
- Cybuster (1999), Ken
- Rave Master (2001-2002), Deep Snow, and L'Tiangle
- The Prince of Tennis (2001-2005), Kojiro Saeki
- Hikarian (2002-2003), Seven
- Mouse (2003), Masatoshi Minami
- Xevious (2003), Takeru
- Enzai (2004), Guildias
- Hell Girl (2005), Salaryman (ep 1)
- The Law of Ueki (2005), Kageo 'Kurokage' Kuroki
- Eyeshield 21 (2005), Masaru Honjo (ep 9)
- Shugo Chara! (2007-2008), Tsumugu Hinamori
- Saint Seiya (2008), Alraune Queen
- Shugo Chara!! Doki- (2008-2009), Tsumugu Hinamori
- One Piece (2009-2024), Gyaro, Izou
- Digimon Xros Wars (2010), Stingmon
- Saint Seiya Omega (2012), Dorado Spear
- World Trigger (2014), Tōru Narasaka
- Charlotte (2015), Udō (ep 2)
- Dragon Ball Super (2015-2018), Zenō's Attendant, Anato, Katopesla
- Kaginado (2021), Kengo Miyazawa

=== Video games ===
- Ranma ½: Super Hard Battle (1994), Herb
- Enzai (2002), Guildias
- Fatal Frame III: The Tormented (2005), Kei Amakura
- Zettai Fukuju Meirei (2005), Kia
- Warriors Orochi 2 (2008), Minamoto no Yoshitsune
- Digimon Story: Cyber Sleuth (2015), Dukemon
- Digimon World: Next Order (2016), Yukimura
- Valkyrie Connect (2016), Blade Crazed Welver, Druid Thiazi

=== Dubbing ===
- The New Woody Woodpecker Show (2000-2002), Woodrow Woodpecker (Carlos Alazraqui)
