= Haruto Umezawa =

Japanese manga artist

Haruto Umezawa (梅澤春人, Umezawa Haruto, born on March 27, 1966, in Saitama, Japan) is a Japanese manga artist. Umezawa is best known for the manga series Hareluya II Bøy and Bremen. He was also a former assistant to Tsukasa Hojo and Takehiko Inoue.

== Works ==
- Sakenomi☆Dōji (Weekly Shōnen Jump, 1990)
- Hareluya (Weekly Shōnen Jump, 1992)
- Hareluya II Bøy (Weekly Shōnen Jump, 1992–1999)
- Bremen (Weekly Shōnen Jump, 2000–2001)
- Detective Dance (One-shot; Weekly Shōnen Jump, 2000)
- Sword Breaker (Weekly Shōnen Jump, 2002)
- Live (Weekly Shōnen Jump, 2004)
- Countach (Weekly Young Jump, 2004–2012)
