= Hirano Kuniomi =

- 平野 國臣
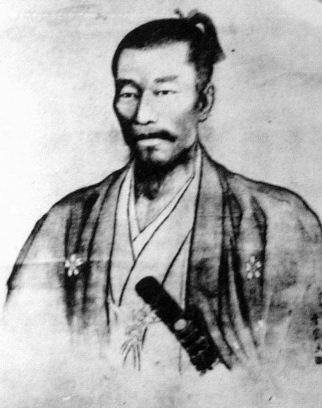

Personal details
- Born: May 12, 1828 Fukuoka Domain, Chikuzen Province, Japan
- Died: August 21, 1864 (aged 36) Kyoto, Yamashiro Province, Japan
- Cause of death: Execution by decapitation

Hirano Jirō Kuniomi (Japanese: 平野 二郎 國臣; 1828–1864) was a Japanese samurai, antiquarian, and nationalist activist.

== Biography ==
Hirano Kuniomi was born on May 12, 1828 to Hirano Kichirōemon (平野 吉郎右衛門), a retainer of the Kuroda clan. Originally an ashigaru, Kichirōemon was promoted to the rank of samurai in recognition of his service.

In 1841, Hirano was adopted at age 13 by Koganemaru Hikoroku (小金丸 彦六), commander of an ashigaru gunnery unit. He later studied kokugaku under Tominaga Zensai (富永 漸斎) and became deeply devoted to revering Japan's ancient traditions and institutions. His beliefs intensified after he read the works of Aizawa Seishisai.

In 1855, he was assigned to a post in Nagasaki, where he studied under Sakata Morotō (坂田 諸遠), a kokugaku scholar and expert on the ancient customs of the Imperial Court. Influenced by Sakata, Hirano began dressing in an old-fashioned outfit of hitatare robes and an eboshi hat. His adoptive family was embarrassed by his eccentric personality, eventually leading to the dissolution of his adoption and his return to the Hirano family. He was later known as a master player of the ichigenkin.

Hirano became involved with anti-foreign activists from Satsuma Domain. In 1858, Hirano was one of a group of friends who prevented Saigō Takamori from drowning himself in Kagoshima Bay alongside the monk Gesshō.

In 1863, Hirano led a small army of rebels to seize the Ikuno Silver Mine in Tajima Province, an event that became known as the Ikuno incident. After unsuccessfully calling for local peasants and gōnō to join an uprising, Hirano's supporters fled and he himself attempted to go into hiding. He was captured by authorities from the Toyooka Domain and brought to a prison in Kyoto.

In 1864, a conflagration known as the dondon-yake — sparked by the Kinmon incident — began to spread across Kyoto. Fearing that the fire would reach the wooden prison and allow the roughly 30 prisoners to escape, officials decided to immediately execute all the prisoners. Although his case had not yet been brought to court, Hirano was executed by decapitation.

== Bibliography ==
- 浦辺 Urabe, 登 Noboru (2009). 太宰府天満宮の定遠館 Dazaifu Tenmangū no Teienkan. Japan: 弦書房 Genshobō. ISBN 9784863290266.
- 浦辺 Urabe, 登 Noboru (2020). 維新秘話福岡 Ishin hiwa Fukuoka. Japan: 花乱社 Karansha. ISBN 9784910038155.
- 森 Mori, 政太郎 Seitarō (1979). 筑前名家人物志 Chikuzen meika jinbutsushi. Japan: 文献出版 Bunken Shuppan.
