= Hareluya II Boy =

Japanese manga series

- First tankōbon volume cover
- Genre: Comedy, yankī
- Manga

Hareluya
- Written by: Haruto Umezawa
- Published by: Shueisha
- Imprint: Jump Comics
- Magazine: Weekly Shōnen Jump
- Original run: June 15, 1992 – August 17, 1992
- Volumes: 1
- Manga
- Written by: Haruto Umezawa
- Published by: Shueisha
- Imprint: Jump Comics
- Magazine: Weekly Shōnen Jump
- Original run: November 30, 1992 – February 8, 1999
- Volumes: 33
- Anime television series
- Directed by: Kiyoshi Egami
- Written by: Yasuhiro Imagawa
- Music by: Shingo Kobayashi
- Studio: Triangle Staff
- Licensed by: Sentai Filmworks
- Original network: TV Tokyo
- Original run: April 8, 1997 – September 30, 1997
- Episodes: 25
- icon

Hareluya II Boy (stylized as HARELUYA II BØY), also known simply as Bøy, is a Japanese manga series written and illustrated by Haruto Umezawa. It is a sequel to Umezawa's Hareluya, serialized in Shueisha's shōnen manga magazine Weekly Shōnen Jump in 1992. Hareluya II Boy was serialized in the same magazine from November 1992 to February 1999, with its chapters collected in 33 tankōbon volumes. A 25-episode anime television series adaptation by Triangle Staff was broadcast on TV Tokyo from April to September 1997. The anime series has been licensed by Sentai Filmworks.

== Characters ==
Hareluya Hibino (日々野 晴矢, Hibino Hareruya)
Voiced by: Shin-ichiro Miki
Makoto Ichijo (一条 誠, Ichijō Makoto)
Voiced by: Yūsei Oda
Michiru Yamana (山奈 みちる, Yamana Michiru)
Voiced by: Naoko Miura
Kiyoshiro Okamoto (岡本 清志郎, Okamoto Kiyoshirō)
Voiced by: Yūji Ueda

== Media ==
=== Manga ===
Written and illustrated by Haruto Umezawa, the first series, Hareluya, was serialized in Shueisha's shōnen manga magazine Weekly Shōnen Jump from June 15 to August 17, 1992. Shueisha collected the chapters in a single tankōbon volume, released on January 7, 1993. Hareluya II Boy was serialized in the same magazine from November 30, 1992, to February 8, 1999. Shueisha collected its chapters in thirty-three tankōbon volumes, released from May 1, 1993, to April 7, 1999.

=== Anime ===
A twenty-five episodes anime television series by Triangle Staff was broadcast on TV Tokyo from April 8 to September 30, 1997. The Japanese band Spyke performed the opening theme "Tight-Break" and the ending themes "Words of Free" and "Closet Freak" (クロゼットフリーク, Kurozetto Furīku).

In November 2021, Sentai Filmworks announced that they had licensed the series. It is set to be streamed worldwide in select digital outlets and it will be also released on home video.
