= Rurouni Kenshin season 2 =

Rurouni Kenshin
- Season 2
- Cover of the DVD compilation released by Media Blasters
- No. of episodes: 35

Release
- Original network: Fuji Television
- Original release: October 30, 1996 – September 17, 1997

Season chronology
- ← Previous; Season 1 Next → Season 3

The second season of the 1996 Rurouni Kenshin anime television series is directed by Kazuhiro Furuhashi and produced by Aniplex and Fuji Television. The season ran in Japan on Fuji Television from October 30, 1996, to September 17, 1997. The season is based on volumes 7–18 of the manga series Rurouni Kenshin by Nobuhiro Watsuki, and depicts the fight of the former assassin named Kenshin Himura, against his successor Makoto Shishio, who aims to conquer Japan.

The series was licensed for broadcast and home video release in North America by Media Blasters, who split it up into "seasons". They refer to their English dub of episodes 28–62 as season two. They were aired on Cartoon Network's Toonami programming block from April 23, 2003, through October 18, 2003. Media Blasters released this season within DVDs seven to fourteen of the anime from May 1, 2001, to November 13, 2001. A DVD compilation of season 2 was released on January 17, 2006.

Five pieces of theme music are used during these episodes. The opening theme "Sobakasu" by Judy and Mary continues to be used, but the ending theme changed to "Heart of Sword – Yoake Mae" by T.M. Revolution. By episode 39, the opening theme is "1/2" by Makoto Kawamoto and the ending theme is "The Fourth Avenue Cafe" by L'Arc-en-Ciel. The theme changes back to "Heart of Sword – Yoake Mae" at episode 43, due to backlash from L'Arc-en-Ciel's drummer being arrested for heroin possession, then at episode 50 it changes again, this time to "It's Gonna Rain" by Bonnie Pink.

== Episodes ==
No. overall	No. in season	Title	Directed by	Written by	Animation directed by	Original release date	American air date
28	1	"Prelude to the Impending Fight: The Shadow of the Wolf Draws Near"; Transliteration: "Aratanaru Kessen e no Jokyoku: Semarikuru Ōkami no Kage!" (Japanese: 新たなる血戦への序曲· 迫り来る狼の影!)	Yoshihiro Takamoto	Yoshiyuki Suga	Ikkō Kobayashi	October 30, 1996	April 24, 2003
The brief period of peace of the group is interrupted by the presence of former Shinsengumi captain Hajime Saito, who is now using the name of Goro Fujita and working for the Tokyo police, stirs up some of the bloodiest memories of Kenshin Himura of the Bakumatsu. Saito arrives at the Kamiya dojo disguised as a medicine seller and fights Sanosuke Sagara, injuring him severely in the process.
29	2	"Strongest Opponent From the Past: Merciless Fangs Strike!"; Transliteration: "Shijō Saikyō no Shukuteki! Osoikakaru Hijō no Kiba" (Japanese: 史上最強の宿敵! 襲いかかる非情の牙)	Directed by : Akira Shimizu; Storyboarded by : Mamoru Hosoda	Yoshiyuki Suga	Toshimitsu Kobayashi	November 6, 1996	April 25, 2003
Sanosuke is beginning to recover from the wounds inflicted by Saito, but Kenshin's mind is greatly disturbed. Arundo Akamatsu, another assassin hired by the same man who is paying Saito, fights Kenshin by drawing him out but loses to Kenshin while Saito arrives at the dojo using his status as a policeman to gain entrance. Kenshin and Saito begin to fight, despite Kaoru's attempt to stop them as she begs Kenshin not to revert to his manslayer persona.
30	3	"A Devil of Vengeance: Makoto Shishio's Plot"; Transliteration: "Fukushū no Akki: Shishio Makoto no Bōryaku" (Japanese: 復讐の悪鬼 志々雄真実(まこと)の謀略)	Kazuhiro Furuhashi	Michiru Shimada	Masahide Yanagisawa	November 13, 1996	April 28, 2003
Kenshin continues his battle against Saito after being stabbed. Kaoru Kamiya is frightened to see that Kenshin's alter ego begins to emerge, as she starts to lose hope in ever seeing his gentle side again. However, one of Saito's superiors appears and stops the fight just as it is reaching a climax, in which Kenshin returns to normal after punching himself in the face. Toshimichi Okubo explains to Kenshin that Makoto Shishio, the man who took over Kenshin's position as the Shadow Hitokiri for the Ishinshishi, survived being burned alive and has begun gathering an army to overthrow the government. Kenshin is to comply in defeating Shishio. He is given a deadline to come to a decision and threatened that if he should decline Megumi Takani could be charged for opium manufacture.
31	4	"A Wish Unrequited: Kenshin Departs"; Transliteration: "Todokanu Omoi... Kenshin no Tabidachi" (Japanese: 届かぬ想い......剣心の旅立ち!)	Directed by : Kazuhiro Furuhashi; Storyboarded by : Norio Matsumoto	Michiru Shimada	Atsuko Nakajima	November 27, 1996	April 29, 2003
As the deadline for Kenshin's decision on whether to go to Kyoto nears, Kaoru becomes anxious at the possibility of his leaving. After Okubo's assassination by Sojiro Seta, Kenshin decides to go to Kyoto and bids an emotional goodbye to Kaoru, implying that it is likely they will never meet again.
32	5	"Change Tears to Courage: Kaoru Kamiya's Choice"; Transliteration: "Namida o Yūki ni Kaete! Kamiya Kaoru ga Eranda Michi" (Japanese: 涙を勇気にかえて! 神谷薫が選んだ道)	Shunji Yoshida	Yoshiyuki Suga	Moriyasu Taniguchi	December 4, 1996	April 30, 2003
Kaoru is deeply depressed and distressed since Kenshin left Tokyo. With the help of Yahiko Myōjin, Tae Sekihara, Tsubame Sanjō, and especially Megumi, Kaoru regains her courage and decides to leave Tokyo to go to Kyoto and see Kenshin. Saito also gets into a fight with Sanosuke, telling him not to go to Kyoto. Sanosuke leaves on his own despite Saito's warning that he will be a liability to Kenshin.
33	6	"For the Title of Strongest: Aoshi's New Conflict"; Transliteration: "Saikyō no Shōgō o Tsukamu made! Aoshi no Aratanaru Tatakai" (Japanese: 最強の称号を掴むまで! 蒼紫の新たなる闘い)	Directed by : Shigeru Ōmachi; Storyboarded by : Kazu Yokota	Michiru Shimada	Akira Matsushima	December 11, 1996	May 1, 2003
Aoshi Shinomori has now chosen the path of chaos. He will do anything to defeat Kenshin, as he feels it will prove to the world that the Oniwabanshū were the strongest fighters of the revolution. Aoshi defeats four monks working for Shishio, who were merely meant to test Aoshi's strength, but refuses to join Shishio after Sojiro tries to convince him.
34	7	"The Girl Bandit: Misao Makimachi's Hidden Side"; Transliteration: "Oihagi Shōjo – Makimachi Misao no Kakusareta Shōtai!" (Japanese: 追いはぎ少女· 巻町 操の隠された正体!)	Yoshihiro Takamoto	Michiru Shimada	Ikkō Kobayashi	January 8, 1997	May 2, 2003
Misao Makimachi, the female bandit, whom Kenshin meets in the forest, is a member of the Oniwabanshū. She wants very badly to see Aoshi, though unknowing of his whereabouts, and to see the other four members of the Oniwabanshū, yet unaware of their fate. Misao refuses to stop chasing Kenshin, as she believes that he can lead her to them.
35	8	"Conquered Village: The Grasp of Shishio's Hands"; Transliteration: "Ubawareta Mura – Osoikakaru Shishio no Ma no Te!" (Japanese: 奪われた村· 襲いかかる志々雄の魔の手!)	Directed by : Akira Shimizu; Storyboarded by : Hiroyuki Kakudō	Yoshiyuki Suga	Toshimitsu Kobayashi	January 15, 1997	June 17, 2003
Along the way to Kyoto, Kenshin and Misao come across a nearly dead man with his little brother in his arms, Eiji Mishima. The man dies, and Eiji wants to avenge his brother's death by killing Senkaku, the man who slayed his elder brother. Kenshin, Eiji, and Misao travel to Shingetsu Village, Eiji's hometown, and fight some of Shishio's soldiers off. Kenshin and Saito leave Misao and Eiji behind, as they go to Shishio's mansion nearby.
36	9	"Across the Boundary Between Edo and Meiji: Kenshin and Shishio Face to Face!"; Transliteration: "Bakumatsu no Toki o Koete! Taiji Shita Shishio to Kenshin" (Japanese: 幕末の時を超えて! 対峙した志々雄と剣心)	Directed by : Jun Fukuda; Storyboarded by : Akihiro Enomoto	Yoshiyuki Suga	Akihiro Enomoto	January 22, 1997	June 18, 2003
Kenshin and Senkaku fight, and Kenshin wins with ease. Misao and Eiji make their way up to the same mansion in an attempt to defeat Senkaku for themselves.
37	10	"Shock! The Reverse-Blade is Broken: Sojiro's Tenken verses Kenshin"; Transliteration: "Shōgeki! Oreta Sakabatō – Tenken no Sōjirō Tai Kenshin" (Japanese: 衝撃!折れた逆刃刀· 天剣の宗次郎対剣心)	Katsuyoshi Yatabe	Yoshiyuki Suga	Kazunori Takahashi	January 29, 1997	June 19, 2003
Shishio is then challenged by Kenshin, but Shishio refuses to accept, saying that Kenshin is weak as a wanderer. Shishio tells Sojiro, his right hand man, to fight Kenshin instead. Shishio and Yumi Komagata leave the mansion. Sojiro and Kenshin both use the battōjutsu drawing technique, in which both swords are severely damaged. Sojiro leaves the mansion, telling Kenshin to get a new sword before they meet again.
38	11	"Sanosuke's Secret Training: The Challenge of Anji the Destroyer"; Transliteration: "Sanosuke, Gokui no Shugyō! Hakaisō – Anji e no Chōsen" (Japanese: 左之助, 極意の修行! 破戒僧·安慈への挑戦)	Directed by : Shigeru Ōmachi; Storyboarded by : Kazu Yokota	Yoshiyuki Suga	Akira Matsushima	February 5, 1997	June 20, 2003
Sanosuke gets lost in a forest. He finds a monk there that goes by the name of Anji Yūkyūzan, who gives him some food. Sanosuke ends up convincing Anji to teach him how to use a destructive punching technique called the Futae no Kiwami attack, capable of completely pulverize huge boulders into dust. Anji gives Sanosuke one week to learn the technique, lest he be killed. After learning it, Sanosuke leaves for Kyoto.
39	12	"The Creator of the Reverse-Blade Sword: Shakku Arai's Final Swing"; Transliteration: "Sakabatō o Tsukutta Otoko – Arai Shakkū Saigo no Hito Furi!" (Japanese: 逆刃刀を作った男· 新井赤空 最後の一振り!)	Yoshihiro Takamoto	Yoshiyuki Suga	Kuniyuki Ishii	February 12, 1997	June 23, 2003
Kenshin and Misao make it to Kyoto. There, they meet Nenji Kashiwazaki, code-named Okina, of the Oniwabanshū. Okina knows Kenshin is the legendary Battousai the Manslayer the moment he lays eyes on him. Kenshin goes to see Sekku Arai, who is the son of Shakku Arai, the one who forged the reverse blade sword, in order to replace the broken sword. Sekku refuses, saying that this is a time of peace, and that the samurai have all thrown their swords away. Later, a man by the name of Chō Sawagejō, known as the Sword Hunter of the Ten Swords, abducts Iori, the baby son of Sekku. Kenshin demands that Chō release Iori.
40	13	"A Killer Without Mercy: Fight to the Death Against the Cho of the Juppongatana"; Transliteration: "Osorubeki Mujō no Shikaku! Juppongatana Chō to no Shitō" (Japanese: 恐るべき無情の刺客! 十本刀·張との死闘)	Directed by : Akira Shimizu; Storyboarded by : Hiroyuki Kakudou	Yoshiyuki Suga	Toshimitsu Kobayashi	February 19, 1997	June 24, 2003
Kenshin finds that Chō has kidnapped Iori in order to obtain the final masterpiece of Shakku for himself. Kenshin is forced to choose between keeping his vow not to kill and saving the baby, ultimately deciding to do both by drawing the sword he has now been given. However, it is revealed that the sword he is holding happens to be the final masterpiece of Shakku, the perfected reverse blade sword, merely stunning Chō. Kenshin then leaves to find his master, Seijuro Hiko, in order to learn the final technique of the Hiten Mitsurugi-ryū battōjutsu.
41	14	"The Ultimate Technique of the Hiten-Mitsurugi Style: Reunion with a Mentor, Seijuro Hiko"; Transliteration: "Hiten Mitsurugiryū no Ōgi! Shishō Hiko Seijūrō to no Saikai" (Japanese: 飛天御剣流の奥義! 師匠比古清十郎との再会)	Directed by : Jun Fukuda; Storyboarded by : Akihiro Enomoto	Michiru Shimada	Akihiro Enomoto	February 26, 1997	June 25, 2003
Kenshin finds his master Seijūrō Hiko living as a potter near Kyoto, but Hiko is initially unwilling to take Kenshin back due to his walking out to join the revolution. Yahiko and Kaoru meet Misao in Kyoto after learning that she saw Kenshin leaving, and later leads the grateful pair to him after they meet Okina at an inn disguised as the headquarters of the Oniwabanshū. Kenshin seems initially upset at the sight of Kaoru, but later replies he is only half of him is angry. They leave Kenshin to train, and on the way Misao's affiliation with the Oniwabanshū is revealed as well as the fact that she does not know of the fate of Aoshi's group in Edo.
42	15	"The Formation of an Alliance: The Day When Aoshi Joins with Shishio"; Transliteration: "Dōmei Seiritsu: Aoshi ga Shishio to Te o Kunda Hi!" (Japanese: 同盟成立· 蒼紫が志々雄と手を組んだ日!)	Katsuyoshi Yatabe	Michiru Shimada	Kazunori Takahashi	March 5, 1997	June 26, 2003
Misao is in denial after hearing of the deaths of four other members of the Oniwabanshū, and feels despair as she recalls her country-wide search for Aoshi, which ended without success. Meanwhile, Aoshi sends a letter to Okina and they meet in a market, where the latter will not allow the former to continue as the leader of the Oniwabanshū, due to his demonic desire to kill Kenshin. Sojiro and several other members of the Ten Swords meet Aoshi and convince him to join them, as they share the goal of destroying Kenshin. After Okina mysteriously leaves with his shinobi uniform, Misao realizes that the two will have a confrontation at the temple and runs to stop it, but proves to be too late as Okina falls to Aoshi's Kaiten Kenbu Rokuren attack, and is told by Aoshi that the next time they meet he will kill her.
43	16	"Between Life and Death: Master the Ultimate Technique, Amakakeru Ryu no Hirameki!"; Transliteration: "Sei to Shi no Aida de! Ōgi Amakakeru Ryū no Hirameki no Etoku" (Japanese: 生と死の間で! 奥義·天飛龍閃(あまかけるりゅうのひらめき)の会得)	Directed by : Akira Shimizu; Storyboarded by : Hiroyuki Kakudou	Michiru Shimada	Toshimitsu Kobayashi	March 12, 1997	June 27, 2003
Seijūrō reminisces about when he first met Kenshin. While they continue training, Kenshin finally proves himself worthy of learning the final technique, in which Seijūrō begins by teaching and instructing him of the Kuzu-ryūsen attack, a technique which simultaneously deals nine strikes to the fundamental targets of swordsmanship. It is then that Hiko proclaims to Kenshin that he must defeat this technique with the ultimate attack. After much worry about his friends, Kenshin finally looks within himself for what he was missing in life and learns the ultimate technique, the Amakakeru Ryū no Hirameki attack, though it pays a high price on the concept of survival.
44	17	"A Decisive Battle Like Violent Waters: The Strongest Troop Juppongatana"; Transliteration: "Dotō no Kessen, Saikyō Shūdan Juppongatana Shūketsu!" (Japanese: 怒涛の決戦· 最強集団十本刀集結!)	Directed by : Shigeru Ōmachi; Storyboarded by : Kazu Yokota	Michiru Shimada	Akira Matsushima	March 19, 1997	June 30, 2003
The Ten Swords have gathered in the temple of Shishio in Kyoto, and are ready to commence the Kyoto Grand Fire and be on their path to victory.
45	18	"As if to Fly: Stop the Launch of the Battleship Purgatory!"; Transliteration: "Tobu ga Gotoku! Senkan Rengoku Shukkō o Soshi Seyo" (Japanese: 翔ぶが如く! 戦艦煉獄 出航を阻止せよ)	Ichirō Takakura	Yoshiyuki Suga	Kazuyuki Kobayashi	April 16, 1997	July 1, 2003
Kenshin, Sanosuke, and Saito go to Osaka to find Shishio and his men on board a ship. They find Shishio, and Shishio launches the Purgatory, a steel-plated battleship he paid a fortune to get. Shishio plans to use the Purgatory to launch an assault on Tokyo.
46	19	"Purgatory Bursts into Flames: The Destiny of Makoto Shishio"; Transliteration: "Rengoku Enjō! Shishio Makoto no Meiun" (Japanese: 煉獄炎上! 志々雄真実(まこと)の命運)	Directed by : Akira Kusune; Storyboarded by : Futa Morita & Kazu Yokota	Michiru Shimada	Kazunori Takahashi	April 23, 1997	July 2, 2003
Sanosuke uses the Futae no Kiwami attack Anji taught him to stop gattling gun bullets from hitting him. He then throws the bombs Tsunan Tsukioka gave him before he left Tokyo right onto the Purgatory, damaging the engine and leaving a hole in the ship. The Purgatory eventually sinks, but not until Kenshin, Sanosuke, and Saito get off safely. Shishio issues a challenge; Kenshin can only meet him at his base and get to him by completing one-on-one fights. Kyoto is spared from the Kyoto Grand Fire as well, thanks to intervention by the Oniwabanshū, now headed by Misao.
47	20	"Crash! The Lethal Punch, Futae no Kiwami: The Fist of Sanosuke Screams!"; Transliteration: "Gekitotsu! Futae no Kiwami: Unaru Sanosuke no Kobushi" (Japanese: 激突!二重の極み· 唸る左之助の拳)	Directed by : Shigeru Ōmachi; Storyboarded by : Kazu Yokota	Michiru Shimada	Akira Matsushima	April 30, 1997	July 3, 2003
Kenshin, Sanosuke, and Saito journey to Mount Hiei at the Shrine of the Six Arches to settle the score with Shishio. The first challenger of the Ten Swords in the shrine is Anji the Destroyer, the man who taught Sanosuke the basics of the Futae no Kiwami attack. Sanosuke and Anji duel, and Sanosuke uses a Futae no Kiwami attack at full power, called the Kiwami Hazuchi attack, and knocks Anji down. Sanosuke thinks he is dead, until he gets back up more angry than ever.
48	21	"Reborn to Salvation: The Beginning of Anji's New Life"; Transliteration: "Guze e no Saisei: Anji no Arata naru Shuppatsu" (Japanese: 救世(ぐぜ)への再生· 安慈の新たなる出発)	Directed by : Akira Shimizu; Storyboarded by : Hiroki Kudō	Michiru Shimada	Toshimitsu Kobayashi	May 14, 1997	July 4, 2003
Sanosuke and Anji continue their duel. Anji is reborn to salvation after talking about his past and being convinced by Sanosuke and the memories from the people of his past that he was doing the wrong thing all these years by being a destroyer. Kenshin and Saito continue on ahead to fight Usui Uonuma, the second challenger of the Jupongottana.
49	22	"The Wolf Destroys the Eye of the Heart: The Fierce Attack of the Zero Stance Gatotsu"; Transliteration: "Shingan o Toraeta Ōkami: Sakuretsu Suru Gatotsu Zero Shiki!" (Japanese: 心眼をとらえた狼· 炸裂する牙突零(ゼロ)式!)	Ichirō Takakura	Michiru Shimada	Kazuyuki Kobayashi	May 28, 1997	July 12, 2003
Usui confronts Saito while the others continue on through Shishio's manshion. Usui's claim to his heart's eye is put to the test by Saito, who observes that it is simply super enhanced hearing adopted by Usui to make up for his lack of sight. Saito realizes that Usui is in fact weak since his desire for revenge against Shishio has driven him to become a mere pawn in Shishio's game. An enraged Usui wounds Saito using the timbe, a tortoise-shell shield, and blocks his vision. However, Usui is no match for Saito's Zeroshiki attack, a move Saito had been saving for a fight against Kenshin.
50	23	"The Promised Time Has Come: Aoshi and Kenshin Fight Again"; Transliteration: "Yakusoku o Hatasu Toki: Aoshi to Kenshin no Saisen!" (Japanese: 約束を果たす時· 蒼紫と剣心の再戦!)	Koichi Chigira	Yoshiyuki Suga	Michinori Chiba	June 4, 1997	July 19, 2003
Kenshin senses something coming from the room of Hōji Sadojima, that being the presence of Aoshi. He enters the room, and is determined to keep his promise to Aoshi, and to Misao, by fighting and bringing back Aoshi to the inn. Upon entering the room, Aoshi greets him, and he says that he has thrown everything away, including his four comrades, just for the moment of the duel with him and Kenshin. Aoshi is determined to win the fight and kill the manslayer, to claim the title of the strongest.
51	24	"Wake Up Now! Ignore Your Wounds and Fight to the Finish"; Transliteration: "Mezameru Toki wa Ima: Manshin Sōi no Ketchaku!" (Japanese: 目醒める時は今· 満身創痍の決着!)	Directed by : Akira Shimizu; Storyboarded by : Hiroki Kudō	Yoshiyuki Suga	Toshimitsu Kobayashi	June 11, 1997	July 26, 2003
As the duel between Kenshin and Aoshi continues, Kenshin is being attacked by Aoshi, trying to scold him for who he ought to be. Kenshin is determined to return Aoshi to an affectionate man, allowing him to bring Aoshi back Misao, thus attempting keep both promises he made to each of them. Aoshi finally realizes his wrongdoings, as Kenshin and Aoshi ends the match using their final attacks on each other. After emerging victorious, Kenshin and Sanosuke advance to the next battle.
52	25	"To Make a Miracle: The Battle at the Aoiya"; Transliteration: "Kiseki o Yobiokose! Aoi-ya no Kōbō" (Japanese: 奇跡を呼び起こせ! 葵屋の攻防)	Directed by : Shigeru Ōmachi; Storyboarded by : Kazuhiro Furuhashi	Michiru Shimada	Akira Matsushima	June 18, 1997	August 2, 2003
Kaoru, Yahiko, and Misao are to battle against Kamatari Honjō, Henya Kariwa, and Iwanbō. Yahiko manages to defeat Henya, after being almost killed by his Hikku Happa attack. After that, Kamatari, Kaoru, and Misao fight. Misao gets crushed ribs in the fight against Kamatari, and is unable to continue until she wakes up from a dream of Han'nya, and she and Kaoru defeat Kamatari through a combined effort. It seems like they have won, until two other members of the Ten Swords, Saizuchi and Fuji, appear, which, in turn, puts Kaoru, Yahiko, and Misao at a major disadvantage.
53	26	"The Giant Versus Superman: Like an Arrow Shot at a Time of Despair"; Transliteration: "Kyojin Tai Chōjin: Zetsubō no Fuchi ni Hanatareta Isshi!" (Japanese: 巨人対超人· 絶望の淵に放たれた一矢!)	Ichirō Takakura	Michiru Shimada	Kazuyuki Kobayashi	June 25, 1997	August 16, 2003
Just when all hope seems lost, Seijuro shows up and fights Fuji. He talks to Fuji and make him realize that he was being used and asks for a fair fight. He defeats Fuji with the Kuzu-ryūsen attack. The inn is safe from harm, but Kenshin still has to fight Sojiro in order to fight Shishio himself.
54	27	"Hiten versus Shukuchi"; Transliteration: "Hiten Tai Shukuchi! Sōjirō Tenpu no Chikara" (Japanese: 飛天対縮地! 宗次郎天賦の能力(ちから))	Koichi Chigira	Michiru Shimada	Michinori Chiba	July 2, 1997	August 23, 2003
Kenshin and Sojiro have their second duel, since the one in Shingetsu Village was never finished. Sojiro shows Kenshin his shukuchi technique, one that uses powerful legwork to bring him close to his opponent in an instant. Kenshin manages to get himself pretty wounded in the fight, and Sojiro hasn't even gotten hit once. He even dodges the Kuzu-ryūsen attack, ironically supposed to be an inescapable attack. Sojiro recalls about Kenshin showing mercy to Senkaku during their battle at Shingetsu Village, which poses as a distraction to Sojiro. This then urges Sojiro to take an intermission from the battle after breaking the strap of one of his shoes.
55	28	"The Tragedy of a Stormy Night"; Transliteration: "Arashi no Yo no Sangeki: Sōjirō no Kako" (Japanese: 嵐の夜の惨劇· 宗次郎の過去)	Directed by : Akira Shimizu; Storyboarded by : Hiroki Kudō	Michiru Shimada	Toshimitsu Kobayashi	July 9, 1997	August 30, 2003
It is shown that Sojiro was treated as a servant to his family, one that never showed him respect or affection. He later meets Shishio, who kindly spared his life. After learning how cruel Sojiro's family is to him, Shishio offers him the Wakizashi sword. When Sojiro is soon cornered by his family, he uses the sword to murder them all. Sojiro follows Shishio, as Shishio tells Sojiro that he will become strong.
56	29	"A Duel With an Extreme Moment"; Transliteration: "Kyokugen no Shōbu! Shuntensatsu Tai Amakakeru Ryū no Hirameki" (Japanese: 極限の勝負! 瞬天殺対天翔龍閃)	Directed by : Shigeru Ōmachi; Storyboarded by : Kazuhiro Furuhashi	Michiru Shimada	Akira Matsushima	July 16, 1997	September 6, 2003
After pondering between the philosophies of Shishio's survival of the strong and Kenshin's protection of the weak, Sojiro becomes heavily confused, suddenly breaking down during the fight. Sojiro and Kenshin fight each other and full strength, the Shuntensatsu attack versus the Amakakeru Ryū no Hirameki attack. After Kenshin is claimed the winner, he and Sanosuke make their way to the final battle with Shishio. Sojiro tells Yumi of a secret passageway to get to Shishio's room first, He also reveals the secret of Kenshin's ultimate attack, in that Kenshin takes an extra step in his stance. Sojiro then requests Yumi to return the Wakizashi sword back to Shishio, as a parting gift to leave his side forever.
57	30	"Two Men at the End of an Era"; Transliteration: "Bakumatsu o Kaketa Futari: Shishio Tai Kenshin Saishūsen!" (Japanese: 幕末を駆けた二人· 志々雄対剣心 最終戦!)	Directed by : Shinichiro Aoki; Storyboarded by : Masayuki Ôzeki	Yoshiyuki Suga	Akio Kawamura	August 6, 1997	September 13, 2003
Yumi guides Kenshin and Sanosuke to the top of the Inferno Arena. Kenshin thinks about his past, and what awaits him next, the entire way up to where Shishio himself is waiting, with Hōji at his side. Shishio promises that the battle will end in fifteen minutes, giving Yumi a kiss as he walks off. Thus, the fight between the two manslayers begins. Shishio shows off the Homura Dama attack, the first of his Secret Sword technique. He then bites a chunk off of Kenshin's shoulder.
58	31	"The Age Chooses Shishio?"; Transliteration: "Jidai wa Shishio o Erabu no ka? Kenshin Saidai no Kiki!" (Japanese: 時代は志々雄を選ぶのか? 剣心最大の危機!)	Directed by : Akira Yoshimura; Storyboarded by : Hiroki Kudō	Yoshiyuki Suga	Takuro Shinbo	August 13, 1997	September 20, 2003
Shishio doesn't believe that Kenshin understands the laws of nature, philosophizes about the survival of the fittest through chaos and not just a worthless mirage of peace. Shishio then uses the Guren Kaina attack, the second of his Secret Sword technique, giving Kenshin a concussion. Saito suddenly busts through the door, using his Gatotsu First Stance, executing the Ishiki attack. However, Shishio is protected by a metal plate in his forehead. After trying the rest of his Gatotsu stances, Saito soon gets knocked out by Shishio. Even Sanosuke attempts to attack Shishio, but to no avail. It is then that Aoshi appears to engage in combat with Shishio.
59	32	"Not Out of Luck!"; Transliteration: "Meiun Tsukizu! Tōshi, Ima Yomigaeru" (Japanese: 命運尽きず! 闘志, 今よみがえる)	Koichi Chigira	Yoshiyuki Suga	Kazuyuki Kobayashi	August 20, 1997	September 27, 2003
Aoshi struggles to defeat Shishio, even after landing the Kaiten Kenbu Rokuren attack. After much time passes by, Kenshin regains consciousness due to his swordsman spirit, surviving the painful injuries inflicted by Shishio. Just when Shishio is about to finish Kenshin off with another Guren Kaina attack, Kenshin remembers the promise he made to Kaoru to go back to Tokyo together. Kenshin is able to initiate the Kuzu-ryūsen attack of the Hiten Mitsurugi-ryū, injuring Shishio. Nonetheless, Shishio gets back up because of his swordsman spirit. Despite his injuries and fatigue, Kenshin prepares his final attack, the battōjutsu Amakakeru Ryū no Hirameki.
60	33	"The Man Who is Chosen for Victory"; Transliteration: "Shōri o Yurusareshi Mono: Shishio Tai Kenshin Shūmaku!" (Japanese: 勝利を許されし者· 志々雄対剣心終幕!)	Kazuhiro Furuhashi	Yoshiyuki Suga	Michinori Chiba	September 3, 1997	October 4, 2003
Shishio gets ready to use the Kaguzuchi attack, the final of his Secret Sword technique, to counter Kenshin's move. This result in a void between the two attacks, which temporarily immobilized Shishio, enabling Kenshin to strike Shishio with an immensely strong consecutive hit. Even after miraculously standing back up, Shishio's blood starts evaporating and he begins screaming in pain, since he has fought far longer than fifteen minutes. However, Shishio sets his sights on Kenshin and Yumi, impaling them both, even after Yumi tries to stop Kenshin from killing Shishio. Yumi dies happily, knowing she did something useful for once. As the battle continues, the battle is once again at a standstill. However, Shishio is killed by spontaneous combustion. Hōji, refusing to accept Shishio's defeat, maniacally attempts to destroy the Inferno Arena to kill Kenshin, Sanosuke, Saito, and Aoshi.
61	34	"The Juppongatana Who Remain (aka The Choice for Life)"; Transliteration: "Nokosareta Juppongatana: Ikite Yuku Tame no Sentaku" (Japanese: 残された十本刀· 生きてゆくための選択)	Directed by : Akira Shimizu; Storyboarded by : Hiroki Kudō	Yoshiyuki Suga	Toshimitsu Kobayashi	September 10, 1997	October 11, 2003
Sanosuke and Aoshi drag Kenshin out of the building, eventually escaping the eruption. Saito is left behind due to his overly injured legs not being able to jump the collapsed bridge. The Inferno Arena finally demolishes, seemingly killing Saito. Kenshin Sanosuke, and Aoshi regroup with Kaoru, Yahiko, and Misao. Chō also appears to tell the group the aftermath of the Ten Swords. Meanwhile, Shishio, Yumi, and Hōji gather in the underworld and plot an ambush.
62	35	"Kyoto, the Engraved Memory"; Transliteration: "Kyōto... Kizamareta Kioku, Omoi o Haseta Shuppatsu" (Japanese: 京都...刻まれた記憶· 想いを馳せた出発)	Directed by : Shigeru Ōmachi; Storyboarded by : Toshirou Mitaka	Yoshiyuki Suga	Akira Matsushima	September 17, 1997	October 18, 2003
Yahiko visits Mount Hiei, and Sanosuke shows him where that battle with Shishio took place. Meanwhile, Kenshin visits an unknown woman's grave, and places flowers by it. Also at this time, Megumi explains to Kaoru the severity of Kenshin's wounds, and that it is important to keep him from doing anything that dangerous again. Finally, the group gets on the train to Tokyo, with Misao waving to them and telling them to visit again. After the train departs Saito is seen saying that he and Kenshin will meet again one day and settle the score that they have. When the gang reaches the road to the dojo, Kaoru extends her hand and welcomes Kenshin home.
