= Rurouni Kenshin season 3 =

Rurouni Kenshin
- Season 3
- Cover of the DVD compilation released by Media Blasters
- No. of episodes: 33

Release
- Original network: Fuji Television
- Original release: October 14, 1997 – September 8, 1998

Season chronology
- ← Previous; Season 2

The third season of the 1996 Rurouni Kenshin anime television series is directed by Kazuhiro Furuhashi and produced by Aniplex and Fuji Television. With the exception of episode 95, the season aired in Japan on Fuji Television from October 14, 1997, to the series's conclusion on September 8, 1998. It is based on the manga series Rurouni Kenshin by Nobuhiro Watsuki. Set during the early Meiji period in Japan, the anime follows the story of a fictional assassin named Himura Kenshin, who becomes a wanderer to protect the people of Japan. Unlike previous episodes, these were not adapted from the manga. During that period, the Jinchu Arc was still being written and one more final episode was missing by the end of the anime fillers. Studio Deen, who later animated the Trust & Betrayal, Reflections and New Kyoto Arc OVAs would replace Studio Gallop on animation production starting with episode 67.

The series was licensed for broadcast and home video release in North America by Media Blasters, who split it up into "seasons". Unlike the previous seasons of the series, the English dub of the final season was not aired in North America. Episode 95 did not air in Japan either, as it was a bonus episode for the VHS and DVD releases. Media Blasters released this season within DVDs seven to fourteen of the anime from February 26, 2002, to September 24, 2002. A DVD compilation of season 3 was released on February 14, 2006.

These episodes of the series use five pieces of theme music. The opening theme "1/2" by Makoto Kawamoto continues to be used until episode 82 with "It's Gonna Rain" by Bonnie Pink as the ending theme until episode 66. It was replaced by "1/3 no Junjou na Kanjou" by Siam Shade as the ending theme from episodes 67 to 82. For the remainder of the series starting with episode 83, the opening theme is "Kimi ni Fureru Dake de" by Curio and the ending theme is "Dame" by You Izumi.

== Episodes ==
No. overall	No. in season	Title	Directed by	Written by	Animation directed by	Original release date
63	1	"The Legend of the Fireflies"; Transliteration: "Negaibotaru no Densetsu, Aru Kenkaku o Machi Tsuzuketa Shōjo" (Japanese: 願い蛍の伝説· ある剣客を待ち続けた少女)	Directed by : Kazuya Miyazaki; Storyboarded by : Katsumi Endō	Michiru Shimada	Masaki Hosoyama	October 14, 1997
Kenshin Himura goes off fishing to bring some food on the table. At the river he meets an old man who tells him the legend of the fireflies. At the end it is revealed the old man was telling Kenshin the tragic story of his dead lover, who died waiting for him to return from his long quest to master the sword. He gives Kenshin the message that once in his life, every man meets a woman he will never forget. After hearing his story, Kenshin brings back an iris flower, which he does not give to Kaoru Kamiya.
64	2	"The Birth of Prince Yahiko"; Transliteration: "Yahiko Ōji Tanjō? Karei naru Shakōkai Debyū" (Japanese: 弥彦王子誕生? 華麗なる社交界でびゅー)	Directed by : Yasuhiro Geshi; Storyboarded by : Akihiro Enomoto	Yoshiyuki Suga	Takuro Shinbo	October 28, 1997
A foreign prince is attacked by bandits. As Kenshin and Kaoru are returning from a play, they see this and Kenshin intervenes. During the attack the prince was injured, so Kenshin and Kaoru take them back to the dojo. As it turns out, the prince looks exactly like Yahiko Myojin, and so Yahiko is put in his place to attend a banquet. At the banquet the bandits attack yet again, but Kenshin is there to protect Yahiko, along with Sanosuke Sagara.
65	3	"Find the Lost Treasure!"; Transliteration: "Kieta Otakara o Sagase! Meitanteiken Notarō" (Japanese: 消えたお宝を探せ! 名探偵犬·ノ太郎)	Directed by : Akira Shimizu; Storyboarded by : Hiroyuki Kakudō	Yoshiyuki Suga	Toshimitsu Kobayashi	November 4, 1997
When he finds himself under attack by a gang of masked men deemed the Kenwadan, a politician throws the key to his safe into an alleyway. The Kenwadan frantically tries to pursue a dog that had promptly picked up the key and the chase continues into a river. Sanosuke comes across the same dog the next morning while praying at the shrine for better luck at dice, carrying it back to the dojo in the care of Megumi Takani. The dog, which Sanosuke names Notaro, promptly tears the lives of the protagonists apart, eating their food, stealing and burying their possessions, and generally making a nuisance of himself. Unfortunately, since Sanosuke distributes flyers indicating a found dog, it does not take the Kenwadan long to track Notaro down. While Kenshin and Yahiko is informed by the police about the situation involving the Kenwadan, Sanosuke encounters and defeats the Kenwadan in a nearby forest.
66	4	"Kaoru, Ecstatic"; Transliteration: "Kaoru Kangeki Kenshin no Puropōzu!?" (Japanese: 薫 感激 剣心のぷろぽ〜ず!?)	Directed by : Kazuhiro Furuhashi; Storyboarded by : Kazuhiro Furuhashi & Kiyoshi Hase	Yoshiyuki Suga	Ikkō Kobayashi	November 11, 1997
Kaoru starts faintly daydreaming about being married to Kenshin on Tanabata, after Tae Sekihara explains what an engagement ring symbolizes. Kenshin is distracted with going fishing, coming back with a catfish. Kenshin takes a bite of his share of catfish and finds an engagement ring inside. Tae convinces Kenshin into giving Kaoru the ring, in which Kenshin is unbeknownst to what it symbolizes. During the time Sanosuke goes fishing, he sees a man about to commit suicide, coincidentally finding out that the engagement ring originally belonged to the man, who threw it away when he thought his girlfriend was seeing someone else. Sanosuke gets Kenshin and Yahiko to work out a way to get the ring without hurting Kaoru's feelings. The three confess to her concerning the situation after temporarily intoxicating her. The ring is given back to the man in order for him to be engaged to his fiancée. Note: This episode was the last of the series to be animated by Studio Gallop as Studio DEEN would animate the rest of the TV series as well as the later OVAs.
67	5	"The Gleaming Blade of Legends"; Transliteration: "Kirameku Densetsu no Ken! Shinpi no Kenshi Amakusa Shōgo" (Japanese: 煌めく伝説の剣! 神秘の剣士·天草翔伍)	Directed by : Makoto Sokuza; Storyboarded by : Junji Nishimura	Michiru Shimada	Tetsuhito Saito	November 18, 1997
Misao Makimachi reports to the group concerning a murder mystery in Kyoto, as it is witnessed that strange carvings are engraved on the back of a corpse of a politician. Aoshi Shinomori is approached by another politician seeking protection from a written death threat, only to refuse his request. Misao sends this letter to Okina, who deduces that it is written in either Portuguese or Dutch, and the symbol on the bottom of the letter resembles much of the carvings on the corpse. The assassin ultimately kills the politician and puts Misao in a comatose state. The group goes to Kyoto, finding out that the assassin practices the Hiten Mitsurugi-ryū battōjutsu. Kenshin visits Seijuro Hiko, who reveals that the assassin is a Christian swordsman named Shōgo Amakusa, one who is capable of defeating the Kuzu-ryūsen attack. This episode was the first to be animated by Studio DEEN, whose portion of the TV series deviated from the original manga's story in favor of original filler content.
68	6	"The Medallion of Destiny"; Transliteration: "Unmei no Medario, Sanosuke to Sayo no Deai" (Japanese: 運命のメダリオ· 左之助と小夜の出会い)	Directed by : Naoki Hishikawa; Storyboarded by : Sumio Watanabe	Michiru Shimada	Kazumi Sato	November 25, 1997
Shōgo appears to where Chō Sawagejō is protecting yet another politician. He easily defeats Chō, and flawlessly kills the politician. When the groups go to visit Chō in a hospital, it is confirmed that Shōgo surpasses Kenshin in skill. Okina finds out that the three men killed were responsible for persecuting Christians during the Edo dynasty. Sanosuke enters a cavern behind a waterfall and finds a Christian occult gathered in front of Shōgo's younger sister Lady Magdalia and her childhood friend Shōzo. Sanosuke follows the two outside, and later assaults a band of police officers who were after a medallion in their possession. An agitated Shōzo manages to cause Sanosuke to delve into the waterfall, however soon losing hold of the medallion. Kenshin learns about how Shōgo betrayed his uncle to seek revenge for the befallen Christians.
69	7	"To the Battlefield of Shimabara"; Transliteration: "Taisen no Chi, Shimabara e! Shiyū o Kessuru Toki" (Japanese: 対戦の地, 島原へ! 雌雄を決する時)	Directed by : Shigeru Ueda; Storyboarded by : Zouji Azumaya	Michiru Shimada	Seiichi Nakatani	December 2, 1997
As the group explore Shimabara, they are introduced to an ambassador named Sir Elsten, who is acquainted with Kenshin for saving his life a decade ago at the end of the Edo dynasty. Sir Elsten urges to be contacted if a potential riot occurs. Shōgo is unaware that Sanosuke has the medallion, as he and Lady Magdalia are traveling toward Shimabara. With a crowd of Christians gathered near, Shōgo proves to them that he is deemed the child of God by performing miracles. Kaoru tells Yahiko that she feels pity for the persecuted Christians. The two notice that a group of Christian children dropped a medallion after being seen. Kaoru later enters a house outside a cave, only to find out the location of a cathedral. Meanwhile, Kenshin and Sanosuke are in another part of the cave being surrounded by a herd of dogs led by a round man with a dog whistle.
70	8	"Shock of the Rai Ryu Sen"; Transliteration: "Rairyūsen no Shōgeki! Yami ni Hōmurareta Kenshin" (Japanese: 雷龍閃の衝撃! 闇に葬られた剣心)	Directed by : Hiroshi Morioka; Storyboarded by : Katsumi Terahigashi	Michiru Shimada	Yumenosuke Tokuda	December 9, 1997
The round man accidentally breaks his dog whistle when Kenshin fights back, losing control of the dogs. So, in turn, Kenshin ends up saving himself and the round man from the dogs. The round man is confused, since he was told that Kenshin is a demon and has to be killed. The round man chains Kenshin to a tree and goes for Lady Magdalia to see what he should do with Kenshin. Kaoru confronts Shōgo concerning his purpose having Kenshin dead. Kenshin, broken free of the chains, remains at the tree as Kaoru, Shōgo, Lady Magdalia, and the round man comes to see him. Shōgo battles against Kenshin to prove of his superior strength and speed. Kenshin chooses to execute the Kuzu-ryūsen attack instead of the Amakakeru Ryū no Hirameki attack, showing mercy upon Shōgo. However, Shōgo strikes Kenshin with blindness, as he falls over a cliff into the waters below.
71	9	"The Conspiracy of Kaiou: Shougo Caught in a Trap"; Transliteration: "Kaiō no Inbō, Wana ni Kakatta Shōgo!" (Japanese: 傀王の陰謀 罠にかかった翔伍!)	Directed by : Hiroyuki Yokoyama; Storyboarded by : Junji Nishimura	Michiru Shimada	Tetsuhito Saito	December 16, 1997
Sanosuke has fallen off a crevice inside the cave and sees Lady Magdalia. She patches up his bruises back at her home in the hill. The two later have an argument about Shōgo. Sanosuke reveals that he has lost the medallion. Lady Magdalia locks him inside the room. Meanwhile, Shōgo, plots with Kaiou and Santo, two of his followers, the demise of the Meiji government through the instigation of a civil war, but they are disagreeing over prices and methodology. Lady Magdalia carries a gun and returns to the room where she locked Sanosuke, but he has disappeared locate the lost medallion. Shōzo interrupts Sanosuke's search for the medallion and engages in combat. Both of them are weakened by each other's attacks. Kaiou and Santo are given Lady Magdalia's lost medallion.
72	10	"The Days of Remorse"; Transliteration: "Tsuioku no Hibi, Shōgo to Sayo no Kanashiki Kako" (Japanese: 追憶の日々· 翔伍と小夜の哀しき過去)	Directed by : Akira Shimizu; Storyboarded by : Hiroyuki Kakudō	Michiru Shimada	Toshimitsu Kobayashi	January 6, 1998
Misao tells Kenshin, Kaoru, and Yahiko about the secret between Shōgo and Lady Magdalia. Shōgo was once able to help cure numerous people due to his study under the field of medicine, however he is unable to cure his dying younger sister. When the two were younger, their parents were killed one after another by nonbelievers. Kenshin, Kaoru, Yahiko, and Misao sees that Santo is signalling the formation of an army from his boat. Lady Magdalia is informed that Kaiou has her medallion, alerting her to search for it in his room. She later realizes that Kaiou plans to betray Shōgo and her. Sanosuke and Shōzo show up, trying to stop Kaiou, only to allow the three of them to be locked into the cage, as an avalanche of boulders plummet over them.
73	11	"The Sneering Demon"; Transliteration: "Azawarau Akki! Shōzō, Bakuen ni Chitta Karyū" (Japanese: あざ笑う悪鬼! 庄三, 爆炎に散った火龍)	Directed by : Makoto Sokuza; Storyboarded by : Tsukasa Sunaga	Michiru Shimada	Masaaki Kannan	January 13, 1998
Kenshin is caught in a noose by one of Kaiou's underlings, yet Kenshin is quickly able to defeat him. Meanwhile, Shōzo is left buried under a boulder, and it is up to Sanosuke and Lady Magdalia to help free him, to allow him to report this incident to Shōgo. Sanosuke is to fight another one of Kaiou's underlings, and Sanosuke is easily able to knock him unconscious. However, Lady Magdalia has hyperventilated due to her illness. Kenshin, Kaoru, Yahiko, and Misao arrives accompany the two out of the cave. After Kenshin figures out that Lady Magdalia has tuberculosis, Sanosuke scurries over to find Sir Elsten, for him to treat Lady Magdalia and for him to know about the formation of the army. Shōzo later overhears what Kaiou is plotting, trying to fight him but was defeated, and as a last resort Shōzo threw some pipe bombs given by Sanosuke, thereby killing Kaiou.
74	12	"Sanosuke's Tears"; Transliteration: "Sanosuke no Namida, Futari ni Otozureta Towa no Wakare" (Japanese: 左之助の涙 二人に訪れた永遠(とわ)の別離(わかれ))	Directed by : Naoki Hishikawa; Storyboarded by : Sumio Watanabe	Michiru Shimada	Seiichi Nakatani	January 20, 1998
The army has prepared themselves to fight Shōgo and his Christian martyrs. Sanosuke continued to try to bring Lady Magdalia to Sir Elsten. After achieving many obstacles, Sanosuke manages to luckily encounter Sir Elsten with Santo. However, Santo attempts to shoot Sir Elsten for interfering with Kaiou's goals, in which Lady Magdalia jumps in and takes the bullet. Sanosuke pummels Santo to the ground and returns Lady Magdalia's medallion back to her, thereafter of which she passes away. Sir Elsten hurries to get to the holy hill to stop the war. Meanwhile, Kenshin finally arrives and tries to stop the fight, finding Shōgo there and tells him he will be fought if the children would be forced to sacrifice themselves.
75	13	"The Last Crusade"; Transliteration: "Saigo no Seisen, Gekitotsu! Futatsu no Amakakeru Ryū no Hirameki" (Japanese: 最後の聖戦 激突!ふたつの天翔龍閃(あまかけるりゅうのひらめき))	Directed by : Hiroshi Morioka; Storyboarded by : Katsumi Terahigashi	Michiru Shimada	Kazumi Sato	January 27, 1998
Sir Elsten arrives to the military base to stop the attack, when Misao was there saying that Kenshin is negotiating with Shōgo. Kenshin would be given one hour to convince Shōgo to surrender, before the military becomes involved. Misao informs Sir Elsten that she will send a smoke signal at the peak of the holy hill, indicating a successful negotiation. As the duel begins, Kenshin empathizes with Shōgo, understanding how he feels. They both eventually use the Amakakeru Ryū no Hirameki attack, in which Shōgo is defeated in the end. Kenshin regains his sight, and Misao sends the smoke signal, ending the war and announcing Shōgo's surrender.
76	14	"Bon Voyage"; Transliteration: "Tabidachi no Umi, Kibō wa Kanashimi no Nami o Koete" (Japanese: 旅立ちの海 希望は哀しみの波を越えて)	Directed by : Akira Shimizu; Storyboarded by : Kodo Koji	Michiru Shimada	Toshimitsu Kobayashi	February 3, 1998
Kenshin visits Sir Elsten to find out what will happen to the believers and so on. Sir Elsten is waiting for the decision of the government, should it arrive shortly. An official arrives and tells them that the believers can no longer stay in Japan. This enlightens a thankful Sir Elsten, deciding that the believers can come to Holland. Meanwhile, Sanosuke gives Kaoru a letter and a package concealing Lady Magdalia's medallion, and she goes to see Shōgo for a brief period. Sanosuke goes to Lady Magdalia's tombstone and reminisces of his time with her. An angry Shōzo appears to Sanosuke, who is disappointed in having lost Lady Magdalia. He explains how he feels guilty for taking Kaiou's life. Shōgo later goes to the tombstone, reading the letter that Lady Magdalia wrote, as he makes his way toward Holland.
77	15	"Himura Dojo in Shimonoseki?"; Transliteration: "Shimonoseki ni Himura Dōjō? Mō Hitori no Battōsai Arawaru" (Japanese: 下関に緋村道場? もう一人の抜刀斎現る)	Directed by : Hiroyuki Yokoyama; Storyboarded by : Tsukasa Sunaga	Yoshiyuki Suga	Akira Matsushima	February 10, 1998
While the group are eating at a restaurant, a gang called the Tengu creates a disturbance, in which Yahiko and Misao take them outside and fight them. Then a man claiming to be the legendary manslayer arrives and scares them away. The group is concerned about lodging since there is no room left. They reluctantly make their way up to the temple of the impostor and notices that there is a dojo managed there. The group unwillingly helps out the impostor, therefore having a place to stay. The Tengu group is getting restless and hires a swordsman to kill the fake Battousai. The swordsman arrives at the dojo, demanding to fight the fake Battousai. Kenshin comes back from shopping and saves the impostor by defeating the swordsman. Kenshin later allows him to keep the name of the legendary manslayer, and the group sets sail to go back home.
78	16	"Crush!"; Transliteration: "Gagakusei no Omou Hito, Hakone Yu no Machi Koi Sōdō" (Japanese: 画学生の想う女性(ひと)· 箱根湯の街恋騒動!)	Directed by : Makoto Noriza; Storyboarded by : Kazuhiro Furuhashi	Yoshiyuki Suga	Tetsuhito Saito	February 17, 1998
The group walks through the forest and ends up eating at a resort. However, Kenshin realizes he has lost Kaoru's travelling money. Unable to pay the check, the group offers to work off the money. Later that night, Kaoru and Misao go into the hot springs, but they spot an artist and mistake him for a voyeur. They realize he is an artist seeking inspiration, and the artist begs Kaoru to be his model for his next painting due to her beauty. Unaware that she is already in love with Kenshin, the artist falls in love with Kaoru. Misao and Sanosuke tell the artist that if he can hit Kenshin, Sanosuke will try to bring the artist and Kaoru together. No matter how hard the artist tries he cannot hit Kenshin. After seeing that Kaoru's love for Kenshin is the source of the beauty, the artist gets his inspiration and draws a portrait of Kaoru. As Kaoru shows the others the drawing, they run away in laughter due to the drawing's abstract nature.
79	17	"Kaishu-Katsu and Kenshin"; Transliteration: "Katsu Kaishū to Kenshin, Bakumatsu o Ikita Futari no Shukuen" (Japanese: 勝海舟と剣心· 幕末を生きた二人の宿縁)	Directed by : Naoki Hishikawa; Storyboarded by : Tsukasa Sunaga	Akemi Mende	Masaaki Kannan	February 24, 1998
A man named Daigoro is talking about people being able to go to the Moon, but he receives sarcastic remarks from others. As he leaves with his teacher named Kaishu Katsu, the two are soon ambushed by unknown assassins. The group manages to protect them, until another student named Tetsuma appears and frightens them away. Kaishu exiles Daigoro from the Katsu dojo due to poor swordsmanship, in which Kaoru vows to teach him the skills and techniques of the sword. Kaishu's daughter, named Itsuko, as well as Tetsuma, goes to the Kamita dojo, trying to bring Daigoro back. Daigoro refuses to leave, and Itsuko later decides to reside at the dojo. Kenshin leaves to tell Kaishu that his daughter is staying at the Kamiya dojo.
80	18	"The Unending Revolution"; Transliteration: "Owaranai Bakumatsu, Kaishū ni Kaserareta Tenmei" (Japanese: 終わらない幕末· 海舟に課せられた天命)	Directed by : Hiroyuki Yokoyama; Storyboarded by : Tsukasa Sunaga	Akemi Mende	Kazumi Sato	March 3, 1998
When Kenshin prepares to depart, the group of assassins return, revealing themselves as the Beni Aoi, of which Kenshin has no knowledge of their group. He comes back to the Kamiya dojo to tell the others that Daigoro and Itsuko can continue to stay, although it is hinted that Kaishu misses both of them. It is revealed that Kaishu was accused of giving financial aid to an army for a war during the Edo period. Itsuko goes out to buy some ingredients for the dinner recipe, yet Kaoru causes the dinner to inflame. The Beni Aoi follows Itsuko and kidnaps her. Kenshin later finds Itsuko's hairpin on the ground outside, and Kaishu receives a letter stating the abduction.
81	19	"Conspiracy of the Beniaoi"; Transliteration: "Beniaoi no Sakubō, Kaishū o Nerau Bakumatsu no Ikiryō!" (Japanese: 紅葵の策謀· 海舟を狙う幕末の生霊!)	Directed by : Akira Shimizu; Storyboarded by : Sumio Watanabe	Akemi Mende	Toshimitsu Kobayashi	March 10, 1998
Kenshin pays Kaishu a visit, finding out that he was hiding a sum of money from the government, and that the Beni Aoi is in search of it. Kaishu is informed to arrive at a temple late at night, and his daughter will not be harmed if he chooses to cooperate. Kenshin was told not to come, but he involves everyone else including Daigoro. They arrived at the temple before Kaishu. Daigoro sees Itsuko as he sees her attempting to escape but trips to the ground. Daigoro charged forward and was stabbed.
82	20	"Kaishu-Katsu's Determination"; Transliteration: "Katsu Kaishū no Ketsui, Jidai o Koeta Shinjitsu" (Japanese: 勝海舟の決意· 時代を超えた真実)	Directed by : Makoto Noriza; Storyboarded by : Katsumi Terahigashi	Akemi Mende	Seiichi Nakatani	April 14, 1998
After Daigoro was just stabbed, Kenshin steps forward to fight the leader while the others take care of the rest. The leader is defeated and shortly the police arrive and arrests the Beni Aoi. Kaishu catches Tetsuma red-handed for searching for a map to the hidden money. Tetsuma tries to reason with Kaishu, only to resort to violence. Kenshin intervenes and fights Tetsuma, sword to sword. However, a desperate Tetsuma then uses a gun. Daigoro manages to convince him to cease of his wrongdoings, in which Tetsuma turns himself in for repentance.
83	21	"Yutaro Returns"; Transliteration: "Yutarō Kikoku, Kage ni Hisomu Kurokishidan no Yabō" (Japanese: 由太郎帰国· 影に潜む黒騎士団の野望)	Directed by : Shunji Yoshida; Storyboarded by : Moritake	Yoshiyuki Suga	Akira Matsushima	April 21, 1998
Yutaro Tsukayama returns to the dojo with Professor Hans, having a reunion with the group. Meanwhile, the Black Knights are after Professor Hans and want something from him. The group goes to the Akabeko to celebrate Yutaro's return. Kenshin stays behind after everyone else leaves. The Black Knights attack Professor Hans, taking a map from his possession. They retreat soon after Kenshin steps in to fight. While he was brought back to be treated, Professor Hans tells Yutaro that he has left his notebook and a rock under the porch of the dojo as a clue of the whereabouts of a divine elixir.
84	22	"The Sanada Ninja Squad"; Transliteration: "Sanada Ninjagun to Reiyaku, Okashira Misanagi no Nerai" (Japanese: 真田忍者群と霊薬· お頭御沙薙の狙い)	Directed by : Naoki Hishikawa; Storyboarded by : Tsukasa Sunaga	Yoshiyuki Suga	Masaaki Kannan	May 5, 1998
It is found in the notebook that the divine elixir may possibly cure any illness. It is also said that the Black Knights desire the divine elixir in order to acquire world domination. The Sanada Ninjas has issued a bargain to join forces with the Black Knights, to have ownership over Japan. The protagonists head to Suwa Shrine at Lake Suwa, the location of the divine elixir. They approach a priest who gives them information regarding the history of the shrine. The Sanada Ninjas attack the group, but retreat and go back to their base when they are bombarded by the Oniwabanshū. The Black Knights tell the Sanada Ninja that they will make their move once the protagonists find the divine elixir.
85	23	"A Straying Journey"; Transliteration: "Meisō no Tabi, Shikumareta Omiwatari no Wana!" (Japanese: 迷走の旅· 仕組まれた御神渡りの罠!)	Directed by : Hiroyuki Yokoyama; Storyboarded by : Kazuhiro Furuhashi & Norio Matsumoto	Yoshiyuki Suga	Tetsuhito Saito	May 19, 1998
While the group travels through the forest, Yahiko becomes dehydrated. A hunter passes by and brings Yahiko into his dwelling to treat him with herbal tea. The hunter tells the group that the divine elixir may be found at a lake deep into the mountains. After the lake parts, the group finally figures out that the divine elixir is hidden inside a dark cave on the other side of a crossing. They encounter many obstacles within the cave. Yutaro uses the rock to place on an altar, igniting the cave. However, Misanagi, the leader of the Sanada Ninjas, appears and tells the group that the pathway will lead to the bottom of the abyss, in which the floor collapses as they descend toward the base of the cave.
86	24	"A Heatwave from Beneath the Earth"; Transliteration: "Chitei o Mau Akai Kagerō! Sakki! Sanada Sanninshū" (Japanese: 地底を舞う赤い陽炎· 殺鬼!真田三人衆)	Directed by : Akira Shimizu; Storyboarded by : Moritake	Yoshiyuki Suga	Toshimitsu Kobayashi	May 26, 1998
Misanagi and the Black Knights enter the pathway and begin to move toward the divine elixir. Meanwhile, the group is surround by sulfur and phosphorus at the bottom of the abyss. Sanosuke must punch through the wall to force a current of water to flow through, allowing the group to escape. Outside the cave, they find Kaita, one of the Sanada Ninjas, who is severely injured. Yutaro is able to treat his wounds. Kaita later helps by showing them a tunnel that will lead them back to the pathway inside the cave. The group is soon interfered by Zan and Ren, two of the elite members of the Sanada Ninjas.
87	25	"Schneider's Bet"; Transliteration: "Shunaidā no Kake, Kurokishidan no Hōkai!" (Japanese: シュナイダーの賭け· 黒騎士団の崩壊!)	Directed by : Makoto Noriza; Storyboarded by : Katsumi Terahigashi	Yoshiyuki Suga	Kazumi Sato	June 2, 1998
Kenshin and Sanosuke continue to fight Zan and Ren while Baku, the third elite member of the Sanada Ninjas, is unnoticed. Sanosuke and Kaoru team up to defeat Zan. Baku distorts Kenshin's senses, making Kenshin vulnerable to Ren's attacks. By attacking the bats, Kenshin manages to defeat both Ren and Baku. Misanagi and the Black Knights find the divine elixir among the vast garden hidden deep inside the cave. Melders reveals that he intended to betray Misanagi from the start, permitting Lentz to attack her. However, Schneider defends Misanagi, only to get badly injured by Melders.
88	26	"The Two Guides"; Transliteration: "Futatsu no Michishirube, Yahiko to Yutarō Towa no Yakusoku" (Japanese: ふたつの道標(みちしるべ)· 弥彦と由太郎永遠(とわ)の約束)	Shunji Yoshida	Yoshiyuki Suga	Seiichi Nakatani	June 9, 1998
Kenshin faces off against Melder, who has the upper hand due to his horse and his armor. Melder continues to attack but creates a spark and ignites a flame with the oil on the ground, causing the garden to quickly char. Lentz attempts to get a sample of the divine elixir, only to be interceded by Yahiko and Yutaro. Kenshin uses the Amakakeru Ryū no Hirameki attack to defeat Melders but was badly injured in the process. Melders ultimately is lost within the flames, and both Lentz and Schneider survive the demolition. Yutaro is able to retrieve a sample of the divine elixir. Misanagi remains the leader of the Sanada Ninjas, even after making the mistake of temporarily joining forces with the Black Knights. Professor Hans recovers thanks to the divine elixir. He receives a report saying that Lentz and Schneider turned themselves in, in which they will be investigated for further information.
89	27	"To My Angel Misao"; Transliteration: "Mai Enjeru Misao e... Kyōto kara no Mukae" (Japanese: まいえんじぇる操へ... 京都からの迎え)	Directed by : Hiroyuki Yokoyama; Storyboarded by : Kazuhiro Furuhashi	Akemi Mende	Masaaki Kannan	June 16, 1998
After Misao trains with Yahiko in the dojo, she decides to leave her leave. Aoshi Shinomori arrives to escort her back to Kyoto, but she ends up changing her mind. Kaoru and Misao, along with Megumi Takani, go out to shop. Sanosuke and Yahiko become suspicious, believing that the three are going to a restaurant without them, urging them to tag along. Meanwhile at the dojo, Kenshin and Aoshi spend time with each other. The 5 girls visit a shrine and each pray for a guy, while Sano sneezes over Megumi's prayer. The girls run into Tae, along with Tsubame Sanjō at a restaurant. The girls later encounter a pickpocket who steals Tae and Tsubame's money. Misao easily defeats him and returns the money. Kenshin talks to Aoshi regarding his relationship with Misao. The pickpocket comes back with the rest of his gang, but the girls facilely overpower them. Sanosuke and Yahiko are mistaken as criminals responsible for beating up the gang members. Kenshin and Aoishi meet the girls near the riverbank, in which Sanosuke and Yahiko finally catch up to the others.
90	28	"Feng Shui Surprise Attack!"; Transliteration: "Fūsui no Kishū! Harimegurasareta Gobōsei no Nazo" (Japanese: 風水の奇襲! 張り巡らされた五茫星の謎)	Directed by : Naoki Hishikawa; Storyboarded by : Junji Nishimura	Seiji Togawa	Akira Matsushima	June 23, 1998
The wind and water clans of feng shui compete surrounding a shrine, initially creating a pentagram barrier around the land circa 1602. After 275 years, this magic begins to reactivate and cause disasters in the Tokyo prefecture. After each of these incidents, a man named Reisui claiming to be a water feng shui master appears to provide advice to the victims. However, as soon as the man leaves a mysterious entrepreneur named Saeke turns up to offer his services, such as warding stones inscribed with the power of feng shui. When the Akabeko catches fire from one of its stoves, Tae and Tsubame are to lodge at the Kamiya dojo. Saeke takes a visit there, only to be pardoned by Tae. The group is soon attacked by feng shui fledglings, in which the wind feng shui master named Jinpu arrives to save them.
91	29	"The Magic of Feng Shui"; Transliteration: "Ugomeku Fūsui no Maryoku, Nerawareta Kamiya Dōjō" (Japanese: うごめく風水の魔力· 狙われた神谷道場!)	Directed by : Akira Shimizu; Storyboarded by : Moritake	Seiji Togawa	Toshimitsu Kobayashi	July 21, 1998
Jinpu explains to the group regarding the history between the two clans of feng shui. A map is shown that while the wind clan had set up an Eigou formation that would protect the town, the water clan will set up one that would destroy it. The water clan will construct railroad tracks to the five locations of the warding stones disguised as their Eigou formation. Reisui later attacks the dojo, but later retreats after Jinpu retaliates.
92	30	"Tokyo Under Martial Law"; Transliteration: "Kaigenrei no Tōkyō-fu! Bakushin Suru Kyōki no Ryūmyaku" (Japanese: 戒厳令の東京府! ばく進する凶器の龍脈)	Directed by : Shunji Yoshida; Storyboarded by : Junji Nishimura	Seiji Togawa	Masaaki Kannan	August 4, 1998
Kaoru is severely wounded from Reisui's attacks, Jinpu informs that she will be cured after obtaining natural spring water from Musashino. Kenshin and Jinpu head to Musashino to collect the water, Sanosuke along with Tsunan Tsukioka are to seek and destroy the relics of the shisa, and Yahiko needs to stay behind to protect Kaoru. Meanwhile, the water clan is slowly destroying the wind Eigou formation. Kenshin and Jinpu finally make it into a cave the mountains while dodging various obstacles of feng shui. Kenshin is able to collect the water and safely escorts Jinpu out of the cave before it collapses. The Ryu Myaku starts to move to the east of Musashino toward Nikko to follow the path of the Eigou formation.
93	31	"The Enemy Awaits in Senjogahara"; Transliteration: "Teki wa Senjōgahara ni Ari! Hisui no Monshō o Motomete" (Japanese: 敵は戦場ヶ原にあり! 翡翠(ひすい)の紋章を求めて)	Directed by : Makoto Noriza; Storyboarded by : Katsumi Terahigashi	Seiji Togawa	Akira Matsushima	August 18, 1998
Kaoru has recovered from the spring water given by Kenshin and Jinpu. The two must leave for Nikko to find the jade crest hidden in the area before the Ryu Myaku gets there first. Sanosuke and Tsunan find a book that gave many useful clues but in a difficult language. They find the author to explain its contexts. Clues and hints were being pieced together and the plans of the water clan started to become clearer. Kenshin and Jinpu arrive at Nikko, only to find out that Reisui has the jade crest. Reisui traps the two in a feng shui illusion, but they manage to overcome it. Sanosuke finds Kenshin and Jinpu and explains that the Ryu Myaku has changed their direction toward Senjogahara.
94	32	"The Elegy of Wind and Water"; Transliteration: "Kaze to Mizu no Banka, Ima Koko ni Shiryoku Tsukusu!" (Japanese: 風と水の挽歌· 今ここに死力尽くす!)	Directed by : Akira Shimizu; Storyboarded by : Junji Nishimura	Seiji Togawa	Toshimitsu Kobayashi	September 8, 1998
Kenshin, Sanosuke, and Jinpu go to Senjogahara, encountering the water clan. Jinpu attacks Reisui, but the former has proven to be weaker than that of the latter. Meanwhile, the author arrives and tells Tsunan to put the dragon statue in the center of the shrine, hoping it will stop the Ryu Myaku. Jinpu is able to halt and defeat the water clan. After Reisui sacrifices himself, Saeke reveals that it was he that possesses the jade crest, yet he is shortly defeated thereafter, and the jade crest was taken from him by Jinpu. It is then that Jinpu who directs the Ryu Myaku toward the shrine, of which colliding with the dragon statue weakens and stops its feng shui. The police department slowly rebuild their stations and Kenshin bids Jinpu a final farewell.
95	33	"End of Wanderings"; Transliteration: "Rurō no Saihate, Hi to Ruri no Kizuna wa Shiosai no Uchi ni" (Japanese: 流浪の最果て·緋と瑠璃の絆は潮騒の中 (うち) に)	Directed by : Akira Shimizu; Storyboarded by : Kazuhiro Furuhashi	Kazuhiro Furuhashi	Tsunaki Aki	December 2, 1998 (home video only)
Kenshin and Kaoru leave on a boat to visit a graveyard. Interspersed are photographs of shrines. In exchange for dinner, Sanosuke assists Megumi with the chopping of firewood. Yahiko is currently working at the Akabeko under Tae with Tsubame. Meanwhile, Kenshin and Kaoru spend the night at a local couple's house because of the rain. Kaoru places her hand on Kenshin's as he sleeps, he briefly awakes and allows it. While asleep, Kaoru has dreams of Kenshin wandering off again. When she wakes up early the next day, Kaoru finds Kenshin on the beach and runs into his arms just as day breaks. Kenshin gives Kaoru a seashell and the two return to Tokyo, seeing all their friends at the bridge. Note: This was the final episode of the original anime and the only episode not to be broadcast on television and instead was a VHS and DVD exclusive episode. Also, this episode features a vastly different art style for the characters in comparison to all of the prior episodes as well as featuring live-action ocean stock footage.
