= Rurouni Kenshin season 1 =

Rurouni Kenshin
- Season 1
- Cover of the DVD compilation released by Media Blasters
- No. of episodes: 27

Release
- Original network: Fuji Television
- Original release: January 10 – October 16, 1996

Season chronology
- Next → Season 2

The first season of the 1996 Rurouni Kenshin anime television series is directed by Kazuhiro Furuhashi and produced by Aniplex and Fuji Television. The series premiered in Japan on Fuji Television and ran from January 10 to October 16, 1996. The episodes are based on the first six volumes of the manga series Rurouni Kenshin by Nobuhiro Watsuki. Situated during the early Meiji period in Japan, the story tells of a fictional assassin named Kenshin Himura, who becomes a wanderer to protect the people of Japan.

The series was licensed for broadcast and home video release in North America by Media Blasters, who split it up into "seasons". They refer to their English dub of the first 27 episodes as season one. These were aired on Cartoon Network's Toonami programming block from March 17, 2003, through April 22, 2003. Media Blasters released this season within six DVDs of the anime, each containing four episodes, from July 25, 2000, to May 1, 2001. A DVD compilation of season 1 was released on November 15, 2005.

These first 27 episodes use three pieces of theme music, one opening and two endings. The opening theme is "Sobakasu" by Judy and Mary. "Tactics" by The Yellow Monkey is used as the ending theme for the first 12 episodes. At episode 13, the song changes to "Namida wa Shitte Iru" by Mayo Suzukaze, who also provides the voice for the titular character Kenshin Himura.

== Episodes ==
No. overall	No. in season	Media Blasters titles / Sony titles (Note: The titles on the left are those from the Media Blasters version. The titles on the right are of the Samurai X Sony episodes posted on Crackle.)	Directed by	Written by	Animation directed by	Original release date	American air date
1	1	"The Handsome Swordsman of Legend: A Man who Fights for Love"; Transliteration: "Densetsu no Bikenshi...Ai Yue ni Tatakau Otoko" (Japanese: 伝説の美剣士...愛ゆえに闘う男)	Kazuhiro Furuhashi	Michiru Shimada	Kobayashi Kazuyuki	January 10, 1996	March 17, 2003
After rumors of a man calling himself Hitokiri Battousai terrorizing the citizens of Tokyo begin, Kaoru Kamiya, the owner of a small dojo, takes it upon herself to catch him. After confronting a swordsman with a cross-shaped scar but dismissing him as a simple wanderer, she takes him into her family's dojo. After a confrontation, the wanderer defeats the man posing as Battousai and after some prompting reveals his real name to be Kenshin Himura, as well as his identity as the true Battousai, once a well-known and well-feared hitokiri during the Bakumatsu. Kaoru urges him to stay and declares that it is the wanderer she invites to stay at her place, not the assassin.
2	2	"Kid Samurai: A Big Ordeal and a New Student"; Transliteration: "Gakizamurai Sutta! Monda! de Monkasei" (Japanese: ガキ侍 スッた!モンだ!で門下生)	Directed by : Shin'ichi Matsumi; Storyboarded by : Yoshihiro Takamoto	Michiru Shimada	Mitsunori Murata	January 17, 1996	March 18, 2003
After nearly being victimized in pickpocketing by a young street urchin Yahiko Myojin, Kenshin takes sympathy on the boy who declares himself to be from a samurai family. After his mother's death, Yahiko has been forced into working for the yakuza to pay off his deceased mother's debt. Kaoru goes to rescue the boy but finds herself in a perilous situation until Kenshin appears and defeats the yakuza single-handedly. Kaoru then takes Yahiko as her student at Kenshin's prompting despite the reluctance of both of them.
3	3	"Swordsman of Sorrow: The Man Who Slays His Past"; Transliteration: "Kanashimi no Kenshi - Kako o Kiru Otoko" (Japanese: 哀しみの剣士· 過去を斬る男)	Directed by : Akira Shimizu; Storyboarded by : Akitaro Daichi	Michiru Shimada	Toshimitsu Kobayashi	January 24, 1996	March 19, 2003
Yahiko is discontent with the teachings of Kamiya Kasshin-ryu. Meanwhile, Kenshin is wanted by government forces who arrive in town. Corrupt police threaten to begin executing the townsfolk. Kenshin defeats the aggressors and is greeted by an old acquaintance from the military. Aritomo Yamagata invites him to re-join the military and become a high-ranking officer. Kenshin declines the offer, vowing to use his sword to bring justice peacefully without force.
4	4	"Bad! Introducing Sanosuke, Fighter-for-hire"; Transliteration: "Aku no Ichimonji - Kenkaya Sanosuke Tōjō!" (Japanese: 悪の一文字· ケンカ屋左之助登場!)	Directed by : Hiroshi Tsuruta; Storyboarded by : Hiroyuki Kakudō	Yoshiyuki Suga	Kobayashi Kazuyuki	January 31, 1996	March 20, 2003
Gohei Hiruma, the man who Kenshin had previously defeated in the first episode, hires Sanosuke Sagara, known as Zanza after his signature zanbato, to take Kenshin down. He accepts, but not for the money. Instead, he plans to acquaint himself with his new opponent.
5	5	"The Reverse-blade Sword vs. the Zanbatou: Beyond the Battle"; Transliteration: "Sakabatō Tai Zanbatō - Tatakai no Hate ni!" (Japanese: 逆刃刀対斬馬刀· 闘いの果てに!)	Yoshihiro Takamoto	Yoshiyuki Suga	Hironobu Saitō	February 7, 1996	March 21, 2003
Zanza returns to fight Kenshin, and reveals his reason for fighting and his past with the Sekihoutai, where his captain and teammates were used as scapegoats by the government. Kenshin defeats him and breaks the zanbato, and they become allies.
6	6	"The Appearance of Kurogasa: Visitor from the Shadows"; Transliteration: "Yami kara no Hōmonsha - Kurogasa Arawaru!" (Japanese: 闇からの訪問者· 黒笠現る!)	Directed by : Naoto Hashimoto; Storyboarded by : Saki Noda	Michiru Shimada	Kobayashi Kazuyuki	February 14, 1996	March 24, 2003
Government officials are being murdered. Jinei Udoh, a former hitokiri known for his ruthless attitude, is doing it and the government asks Kenshin for help. When Jinei sees Kenshin, he realizes he has a worthy opponent and kidnaps Kaoru, telling Kenshin to meet him later.
7	7	"Deathmatch under the Moon! Protect the One You Love"; Transliteration: "Gekka no Shitō - Aisuru Hito o Mamore!" (Japanese: 月下の死闘· 愛する人を守れ!)	Directed by : Shunji Yoshida; Storyboarded by : Hiroyuki Kakudō	Michiru Shimada	Moriyasu Taniguchi	February 21, 1996	March 25, 2003
Jinei has kidnapped Kaoru in order to force Kenshin back into his murderous ways. Kenshin almost kills Jinei, but Kaoru calls out, and he spares him. Jinei then takes his own life.
8	8	"A New Battle! The Mysterious Beauty From Nowhere"; Transliteration: "Arata naru Tatakai! Tobikonde kita Nazo no Bijo" (Japanese: 新たなる戦い! 飛び込んできた謎の美女)	Directed by : Akira Shimizu; Storyboarded by : Mamoru Hosoda	Yoshiyuki Suga	Toshimitsu Kobayashi	February 28, 1996	March 26, 2003
One of Sanosuke's friends has died from opium when a mysterious woman named Megumi Takani shows up and needs his help, in which Kenshin tags along. She is being pursued by the Oniwabanshū, an elite group of ninja that used to protect the Edo castle. They protect her, but Yahiko is poisoned.
9	9	"The Strongest Group of Ninjas: The Horrible Oniwaban Group"; Transliteration: "Saikyō no Shinobi Gundan - Kyōfu no Oniwabanshū!" (Japanese: 最強の忍び軍団· 恐怖の御庭番衆!)	Yoshihiro Takamoto	Yoshiyuki Suga	Yasuhiro Aoki	March 6, 1996	March 27, 2003
Kanryū Takeda forces Megumi to return by threatening the people at the dojo. Sanosuke convinces her to return, but Megumi is captured by one of Kanryū's underlings.
10	10	"Aoshi: Someone so Beautiful it's Frightening"; Transliteration: "Aoshi - Utsukushisugiru hodo Kowai Yatsu" (Japanese: 蒼紫· 美しすぎるほど怖い奴)	Directed by : Hiroshi Tsuruta; Storyboarded by : Hiroyuki Kakudō	Yoshiyuki Suga	Hatsuki Tsuji	March 13, 1996	March 28, 2003
The group goes to retrieve Megumi, but the Oniwabanshū stands in their way. Kenshin narrowly defeats Han'nya, and then he, along with Sanosuke, confronts commander Aoshi Shinomori. Aoshi takes out Sanosuke with one blow, urging Kenshin to begin to battle.
11	11	"Farewell, the Strongest Men: The Clash of Light and Shadow"; Transliteration: "Saraba Saikyō no Otokotachi! Hikari to Yami no Gekitotsu" (Japanese: さらば最強の男たち! 光と闇の激突)	Takashi Kobayashi	Yoshiyuki Suga	Kobayashi Kazuyuki	April 24, 1996	March 31, 2003
Kenshin narrowly defeats Aoshi as well. Aoshi asks Kenshin to finish him off, and when Kenshin refuses, Aoshi vows revenge. Kanryū shows up with a Gatling gun and kills the four members of the Oniwabanshū, who die defending Aoshi. Megumi tries to kill herself for her past misdeeds, but they save her just in time. Aoshi buries his comrades and swears that he will defeat Kenshin for their sake.
12	12	"Birth of a Boy Swordsman: The Battle of First Apprentice Yahiko"; Transliteration: "Shōnen Kenshi Tanjō! Ichiban Deshi Yahiko no Tatakai" (Japanese: 少年剣士誕生! 一番弟子 弥彦の戦い)	Directed by : Shunji Yoshida; Storyboarded by : Norio Kashima	Michiru Shimada	Moriyasu Taniguchi	May 1, 1996	April 2, 2003
Yahiko meets a cute girl named Tsubame Sanjō, who works at the Akabeko restaurant under Tae Sekihara. She is being forced into making a copy of the key to the Akabeko restaurant by a group of thugs, and Yahiko decides to help her by himself. He defeats the thugs, although with a little help from the group.
13	13	"Strive for the Grand Championship: Toramaru's Sumo Battle Log!"; Transliteration: "Mezase Yokozuna Toramaru no Dosukoi Funsenki" (Japanese: めざせ横綱 虎丸のどすこい奮戦記)	Directed by : Akira Shimizu; Storyboarded by : Hiroyuki Kakudō	Yoshiyuki Suga	Toshimitsu Kobayashi	May 8, 1996	April 3, 2003
Kaoru takes in Toramaru, a sumo wrestler who has been kicked out of his sumo stable. The leading wrestler fears being overtaken, and uses his status to keep Toramaru down. Kaoru teaches Toramaru to be self confident, and he rejoins the sumo stable.
14	14	"To Save a Small Life"/ "Lady Doctor Megumi to the Rescue"; Transliteration: "Chiisana Inochi o Sukue! Bijin Joi - Megumi no Chōsen" (Japanese: 小さな命を救え! 美人女医·恵の挑戦)	Yoshihiro Takamoto	Nobuaki Kishima	Yasuhiro Aoki	May 15, 1996	January 24, 2004
Megumi treats a girl with a life threatening heart condition, but a faith healer enters town and begins to seemingly perform miracles to cure the sick at exorbitant sums, while spreading rumors that Megumi is a quack. When the young girl is put in a life threatening situation because of her parents' desperation, Kenshin and Sanosuke rush to save her before it is too late.
15	15	"Assassination Group of Fire"/ "Jinpuu Squad on the Run"; Transliteration: "Honō no Ansatsu Shūdan, Jinpūtai Hashiru!" (Japanese: 炎の暗殺集団, 神風隊走る!)	Directed by : Jun Fukuda; Storyboarded by : Akihiro Enomoto	Yoshiyuki Suga	Akihiro Enomoto	May 22, 1996	April 4, 2003
The Jinpuu squad is performing vigilante assassinations. They try and force Sasaki, a local schoolteacher, to pick up his sword again, but Sano and Kenshin fight them off. Toma, the Jinpuu leader, vows to kill Kenshin.
16	16	"A Promise From the Heart"/ "The Secret Sword Technique of Shiden"; Transliteration: "Yūki Aru Chikai! Moeyo Hiken - Shiden no Tachi" (Japanese: 勇気ある誓い! 燃えよ秘剣·紫電の太刀)	Directed by : Hiroshi Tsuruta; Storyboarded by : Hiroyuki Kakudō	Yoshiyuki Suga	Ikkō Kobayashi	June 5, 1996	April 7, 2003
Toma was a former student under Sasaki. Ultimately, the Jinpuu squad is taken down and Toma repents to his former master.
17	17	"Fly to Your Dreams"/ "The Adventures of Marimo, the Human Bullet"; Transliteration: "Yume ni Mukatte Tobe! Hōdan Musume Marimo no Bōken" (Japanese: 夢に向かって飛べ! 砲弾娘マリモの冒険)	Shunji Yoshida	Nobuaki Kishima	Moriyasu Taniguchi	June 12, 1996	April 8, 2003
The group goes to the circus and Yahiko takes a liking to the "Human Cannonball" girl Marimo. A circus boss tries to sabotage the show and make Marimo work for him, but Kenshin, Kaoru, and Sanosuke entertain the crowd until Marimo can find the right mix of gunpowder and fly from the cannon.
18	18	"Run, Yahiko!"/ "Run Yahiko! Get the Reverse-Edged Sword Back"; Transliteration: "Hashire! Yahiko - Sakabatō o Torikaese!" (Japanese: 走れ!弥彦· 逆刃刀を取り返せ!)	Directed by : Akira Shimizu; Storyboarded by : Mamoru Hosoda	Nobuaki Kishima	Toshimitsu Kobayashi	June 19, 1996	April 9, 2003
Gohei Hiruma returns and hires the Onizaki brothers to kill Kenshin. Gohei tricks Yahiko into bringing him the reverse blade sword, and then he ties Yahiko up. Kenshin is outmatched by the Onizaki brothers, but Yahiko escapes and brings the sword, allowing Kenshin to win.
19	19	"Raijuta's Ambition"/ "The Fantasy of the Forbidden Kingdom"; Transliteration: "Raijūta no Yabō - Kinjirareta Ōkoku no Gensō" (Japanese: 雷十太の野望· 禁じられた王国の幻想)	Directed by : Kenichiro Watanabe; Storyboarded by : Kazu Yokota	Michiru Shimada	Akira Matsushima	June 26, 1996	April 10, 2003
The group goes on vacation in Izu. There, a wealthy boy named Yutaro Tsukayama falls under the influence of Raijuta, who intends to create a kingdom with his warriors. Kenshin battles Raijuta's men for the sake of Yutaro, but they gain the upper hand.
20	20	"Revival of the Shinko Style"/ "The Technique Which Heralds a Storm"; Transliteration: "Shinkoryū no Fukkatsu! Arashi o Yobu Kyūkyoku no Satsujinken" (Japanese: 真古流の復活! 嵐を呼ぶ究極の殺人剣)	Yoshihiro Takamoto	Michiru Shimada	Ikkō Kobayashi	July 10, 1996	April 11, 2003
Kenshin leaves Raijuta's warriors to save Yutaro from drowning. Kaoru teaches Yutaro the swordsmanship of the Kamiya Kasshin-ryū, although he doesn't understand its moral aspects. The military attacks Raijuto and his gang.
21	21	"Dissolution of a Nightmare"/ "Destruction of a Nightmare"; Transliteration: "Akumu no Hōkai! Raijūta no Yabō - Kanketsuhen" (Japanese: 悪夢の崩壊! 雷十太の野望·完結編)	Directed by : Jun Fukuda; Storyboarded by : Akihiro Enomoto	Michiru Shimada	Akihiro Enomoto	July 17, 1996	April 14, 2003
Kenshin stops the battle by challenging Raijuta to a one on one battle. He figures out the trick to Raijuta's vacuum cut, and defeats him. Yutaro is injured in the battle, and decides to move to Germany for better medical care.
22	22	"Danger on a Runaway Locomotive"/ "Surprise Incident on a Runaway Locomotive"; Transliteration: "Hatsunori! Bōsō Okajōki Bikkuri Daijiken" (Japanese: 初乗り! 暴走陸蒸気びっくり大事件)	Aoki Yasunao	Michiko Yokote	Yasuhiro Aoki	July 31, 1996	April 15, 2003
The group takes a train trip to Yokohama for fun. A train robbery ensues in efforts of stealing gold coins from a nobleman. The group eventually defeat the robbers. All the while, Sanosuke complains that photography is the work of the devil.
23	23	"Sanosuke's Betrayal"/ "The Fateful Reunion"; Transliteration: "Sanosuke no Uragiri!? Unmei no Saikai" (Japanese: 左之助の裏切り!? 運命の再会)	Shunji Yoshida	Yoshiyuki Suga	Moriyasu Taniguchi	August 14, 1996	April 16, 2003
Sanosuke goes to a picture shop to buy a picture for Tae at the Akabeko restaurant. While at the picture shop, he stumbles across a portrait of Captain Sagara, drawn by Tsunan Tsukioka, another surviving member of the Sekihoutai. Sanosuke joins with Tsunan and defeats Tashiwachi Shindo, the man who framed Captain Sagara ten years earlier.
24	24	"Midnight Battle"/ "Midnight Battle: Kenshin versus Sanosuke Revisited"; Transliteration: "Mayonaka no Tatakai! Sanosuke Tai Kenshin Futatabi" (Japanese: 真夜中の戦い! 左之助対剣心ふたたび)	Directed by : Akira Shimizu; Storyboarded by : Hiroyuki Kakudou	Yoshiyuki Suga	Toshimitsu Kobayashi	August 21, 1996	April 17, 2003
Sanosuke throws a party at the dojo for everyone. Little does everyone except Kenshin know, Sanosuke is really planning to leave the group for good to revive the long lost Sekihoutai with his friend Tsunan. Kenshin goes to stop Sanosuke and Tsunan from destroying the Internal Affairs Department with bombs. Sanosuke rejoins the group and Tsunan stops making bombs.
25	25	"The Crimson Pirate"/ "The Red Pirate – Kenshin and Kaoru Separated"; Transliteration: "Shinku no Kaizoku - Hikisakareta Kenshin to Kaoru" (Japanese: 真紅の海賊· 引き裂かれた剣心と薫!)	Directed by : Shigeo Koshi; Storyboarded by : Kazu Yokota	Michiru Shimada	Akira Matsushima	August 28, 1996	April 18, 2003
Kaoru goes on a boat cruise to get some money. Miraculously, Kenshin, Yahiko, and Sanosuke find the same boat cruise and get on it, not knowing that Kaoru is on the same ship as they are. Kenshin eventually finds out, and then the Kairyu, fearsome pirates who fight like demons, attack the boat. Kenshin, poisoned, defeats Shura, the leader of the Kairyu. As the pirates retreat, they capture Kaoru. Kenshin exchanges himself for Kaoru and is taken by the Kairyu, leaving Kaoru, Yahiko, and Sanosuke behind.
26	26	"Lightning Incarnate"/ "Shura, The Mysterious Female Pirate"; Transliteration: "Inazuma no Keshin! Hokoritakaki Nazo no Onna Kaizoku Shura" (Japanese: 稲妻の化身! 誇り高き謎の女海賊, 朱羅)	Kiyoshi Murayama	Michiru Shimada	Masahide Yanagisawa	September 4, 1996	April 21, 2003
Shura and the Kairyu land at Kairyu Island with Kenshin. Shura does not have the heart to kill Kenshin, and so Ginjo, a greedy member of the Kairyu, makes up a plan to kill Shura and become leader in her place. Shura gets shot in the leg by Geki, another one of her followers who has now sided with Ginjo.
27	27	"Burn, Island of Terror!"/ "The Red Pirate - Conclusion"; Transliteration: "Moeagaru Senritsu no Shima! Shinku no Kaizoku - Kanketsuhen" (Japanese: 燃え上がる戦慄の島! 真紅の海賊·完結編)	Directed by : Jun Fukuda; Storyboarded by : Akihiro Enomoto	Michiru Shimada	Akihiro Enomoto	October 16, 1996	April 22, 2003
Kenshin and Sarujiro helps to nurse Shura back to health, then Shura finds out that Ginjo gave Iwazo some opium. Shura goes off to fight and defeat Ginjo. She is defeated by him, since he played a dirty trick on her. Kenshin then comes in and ends the fight. Geki then throws a bomb, destroying Kairyu Island and all its inhabitants, except for Kenshin and Shura.
