= Yoshimune =

Yoshimune may refer to:

- Tokugawa Yoshimune (1684–1751), the eighth shōgun of the Tokugawa shogunate
- Yoshimune (TV series), a 2006 anime series
