= Yoshimune (TV series) =

Japanese Pachisuro game and anime series

吉宗
- Genre: Comedy
- Anime television series
- Directed by: Hiroaki Sato
- Music by: Akifumi Tada
- Studio: AIC Spirits; Gonzo; Ginga-ya
- Original run: April 6, 2006 – September 14, 2006
- Episodes: 24

Yoshimune (吉宗) is a Japanese anime series produced by AIC Spirits, Ginga-ya, and Gonzo and directed by Hiroaki Sato. It is based on a pachinko game by Daito Giken.

== Synopsis ==
The story is set in a parallel world which combines elements of the Edo period such as samurai and the modern, such as disco halls and motorbikes. The kingdom is governed by Yoshimune, the eponymous title character in the series. All the characters are drawn super deformed and many of them have self-descriptive names.

== Characters ==
=== Yoshimune ===
Voiced by: Nobuyuki Hiyama

The title character of the series and the lord of Edo Castle. He appears to be a negligent ruler but secretly sneaks out of the castle, donning the alter-ego of Yoshi in order to blend in with the commoners and try to solve their problems. He has also taken on the alias Yoshinoshin during a government-sponsored sword tournament. Yoshimune has a fear of dogs which he got by having one of Saien's devices used on him.

=== Hime ===
Voiced by: Junko Iwao

A princess in the castle. She sneaks out on most nights to party at a disco hall where she is popular among the regulars. Jiji has commented she is the only one who can keep Yoshimune in check. She fell in love with Yoshi after he saved her from some kidnappers.

=== Baba ===
Voiced by: Kaoru Katakai

The matriarch of Edo Castle. She has a mischievous personality and is either playing tricks on Hime, or teasing Jiji. She sometimes experiences OOBEs and has a crush on the singer Tamagoro.

=== Jiji ===
Voiced by: Ken Uo

He directly serves Yoshimune. Most of the time his job entails trying to control Yoshimune's outrageous behavior and he is frequently frustrated by the antics of the other inhabitants of the castle.

=== Kunoichi ===
Voiced by: Mari Orito

A female ninja and member of the Oniwabanshū under Kashira. Yoshimune seems to know her well, as he refers to her as "Kuno". She dislikes Hime and appears to be in love in Yoshimune, as she displays signs of jealousy when Yoshimune appears to be fighting hard in the sword tournament in order to kiss Hime.

=== Odaikan and Echigoya ===
Two odd men who like to sit in secret places in the castle and make comments about how "evil" they are.
