= Shinomori Aoshi =

Fictional character from Rurouni Kenshin

- Rurouni Kenshin character
- Shinomori Aoshi on the cover of Rurouni Kenshin Kanzenban Volume 8
- First appearance: Rurouni Kenshin Act 16: Megumi, Kanryū, and...
- Created by: Nobuhiro Watsuki
- Portrayed by: Yusuke Iseya
- Voiced by: Japanese; Yoshito Yasuhara (1996 series); Yuma Uchida (2023 series); English; Terrence Stone (1996 series); John Gremillion (New Kyoto Arc); Alex Organ (live-action films); Ben Balmaceda (2023 series)

In-universe information
- Title: Okashira (御頭)
- Affiliations: Oniwabanshū

Shinomori Aoshi (四乃森 蒼紫), known in Western order as Aoshi Shinomori in the English version of the anime, is a fictional character in the Rurouni Kenshin manga series created by Nobuhiro Watsuki. Shinomori Aoshi is the genius young Okashira (御頭; literally "the head", as in "leader" or "boss") of the Oniwabanshū group for Edo Castle. After the Meiji Restoration Shinomori alone was offered rankings in the military, however, instead of abandoning his comrades, he decided to work with them for Takeda Kanryū. This decision leads to the death of his comrades and his defeat by the former assassin Himura Battosai from the IshinShishi, which results in driving him mad. Shinomori swears to kill Battosai at any cost in order to gain the title of "the strongest" and bestow this title upon the graves of his fallen comrades.

Watsuki created Shinomori as a new rival to face his protagonist in the series and soon would become a strong rival. He based Shinomori on Hijikata Toshizō, the Vice-Commander of the Shinsengumi policemen from the Bakumatsu era, known primarily for his strict leadership. The character is voiced by multiple actors though for the live-action films, Yusuke Iseya portrayed him resulting in swordsmanship training. Critical response was mixed due to his portrayal as a revenge seeker against Kenshin though his causes and honors were said to be important representations of how Japan changed after the Bakumatsu era ended.

== Creation and conception ==
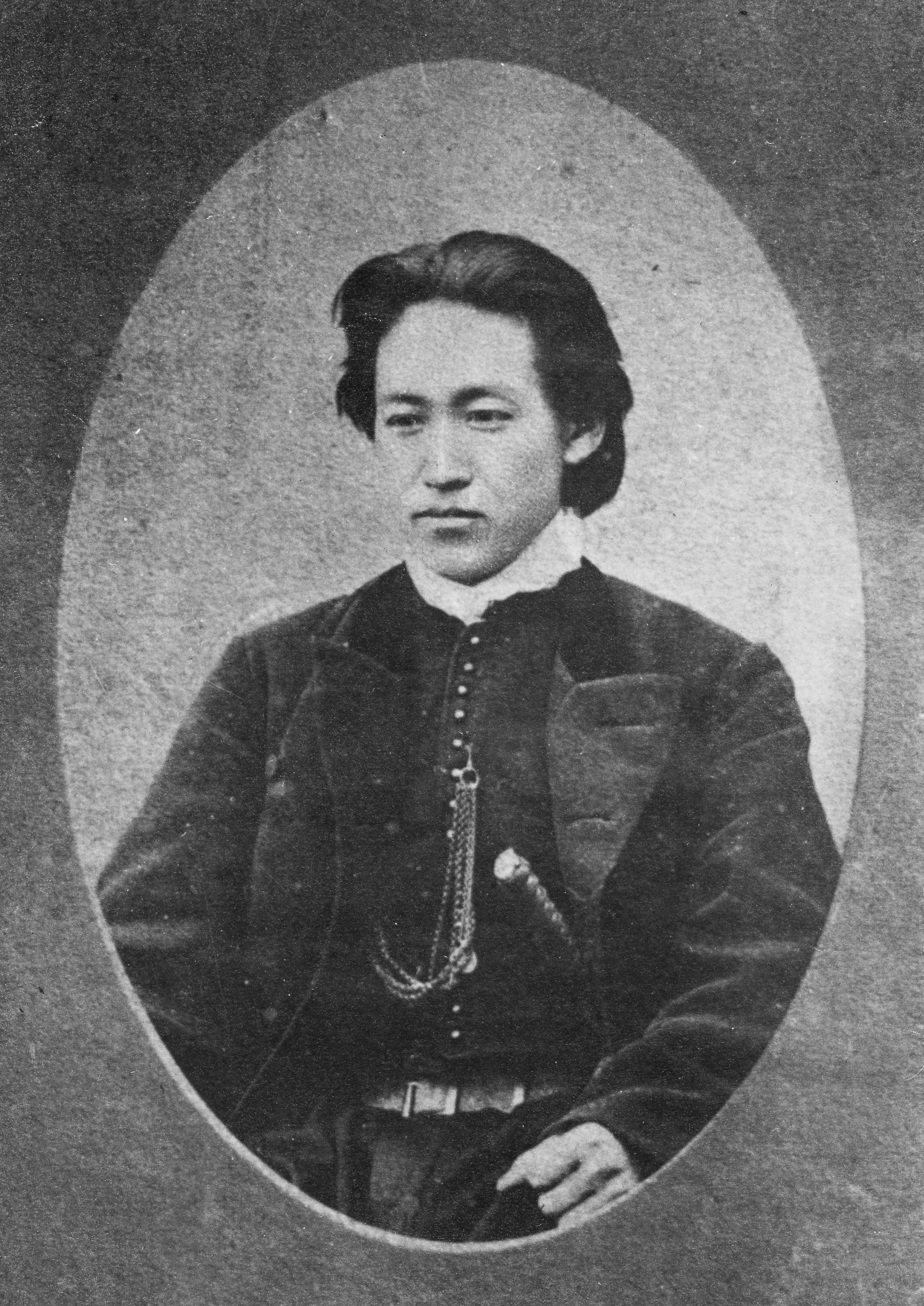
Shinsengumi leader Hijikata Toshizō was the model for Shinomori's character.

When the author of Rurouni Kenshin Nobuhiro Watsuki first discussed the "Megumi arc" with his editor, the editor replied that "having a swordsman of Kenshin's caliber fighting a group of punk-thugs still coming into their first facial hair mi-i-ight not make for the most epic of manga." Watsuki based Shinomori on Hijikata Toshizō, the Vice-Commander of the Shinsengumi. There are most certainly versions of Hijikata portrayed in books and fiction; Aoshi grew out of the Hijikata who killed his gentler feelings and buried his human weakness. Watsuki describes himself as a fan of the other version of Hijikata. Watsuki describes that version of Hijikata, seen in Moeyo Ken (Burn, O Sword), as "a bundle of raw combat-instinct who keeps fighting until the very death." Since, according to Watsuki, the addition of the Oniwabanshū occurred during the "last minute," he found difficulty writing with him since he had not resolved a "concrete image" for Aoshi. Watsuki says that he used no specific design model for Aoshi. As the image of Hijikata grew stronger within Watsuki, the Rurouni Kenshin author added fringes (bangs) to Aoshi's design. Watsuki held a chance to change the hairstyle while compiling the edited manga, but chose not to edit the hairstyle, since he did not want readers to believe that "Aoshi was wearing a rug or anything." Meanwhile, Shinomori's coat was based on a Western comic Watsuki refused to specify. Kanryū wears white since Watsuki felt that "between Kenshin and Aoshi, there was too much black already." Watsuki felt that since he emphasized Megumi and the Oniwaban, Kanryū never became the character he intended.

Watsuki said he originally intended for his design of the 13-year-old "young Aoshi" to be used for another character. He says that many female readers liked young Aoshi. He described drawing Aoshi's fringes as "a pain." During the run of the Kyoto arc, Watsuki reported receiving a reader letter that said "I'll bet Aoshi is gonna be another one of those characters who just happens to be around to help Kenshin in times of need." The letter "kind of got to" Watsuki and he told himself that Aoshi is going to be a "bad guy." As a response Watsuki decided to make Aoshi an antagonist in the arc and fight Okina (Kashiwazaki Nenji), his former master. As the story advanced towards Kenshin's final battle, Watsuki realized that the other characters would have no "glamour" and created the Sū-shin on the spot.

In the animated adaptation of Rurouni Kenshin, Shinomori is voiced by Yoshito Yasuhara in Japanese and Terrence Stone in English. John Gremillion replaced Stone for the original video animation New Kyoto Arc. For the remake of the TV series, Yuma Uchida voices Shinomori in Japanese and Ben Balmaceda does the English voice. Shinomori is portrayed by Yusuke Iseya in the second, third live-action and forth films, Rurouni Kenshin: Kyoto Inferno, Rurouni Kenshin: The Legend Ends and Rurouni Kenshin: The Final. Iseya trained swordsmanship with two swords to work in the movies four months before his debut in shooting Kyoto Inferno. In retrospect, Iseya found several challenges when acting and fighting at the same time. In regards to his portrayal, the superiors told Iseya to make a calm Aoshi. He enjoyed Aoshi's duel against Okina due to their choreography which resulted in the former receiving several wounds accidentally while recording it.

== Appearances ==
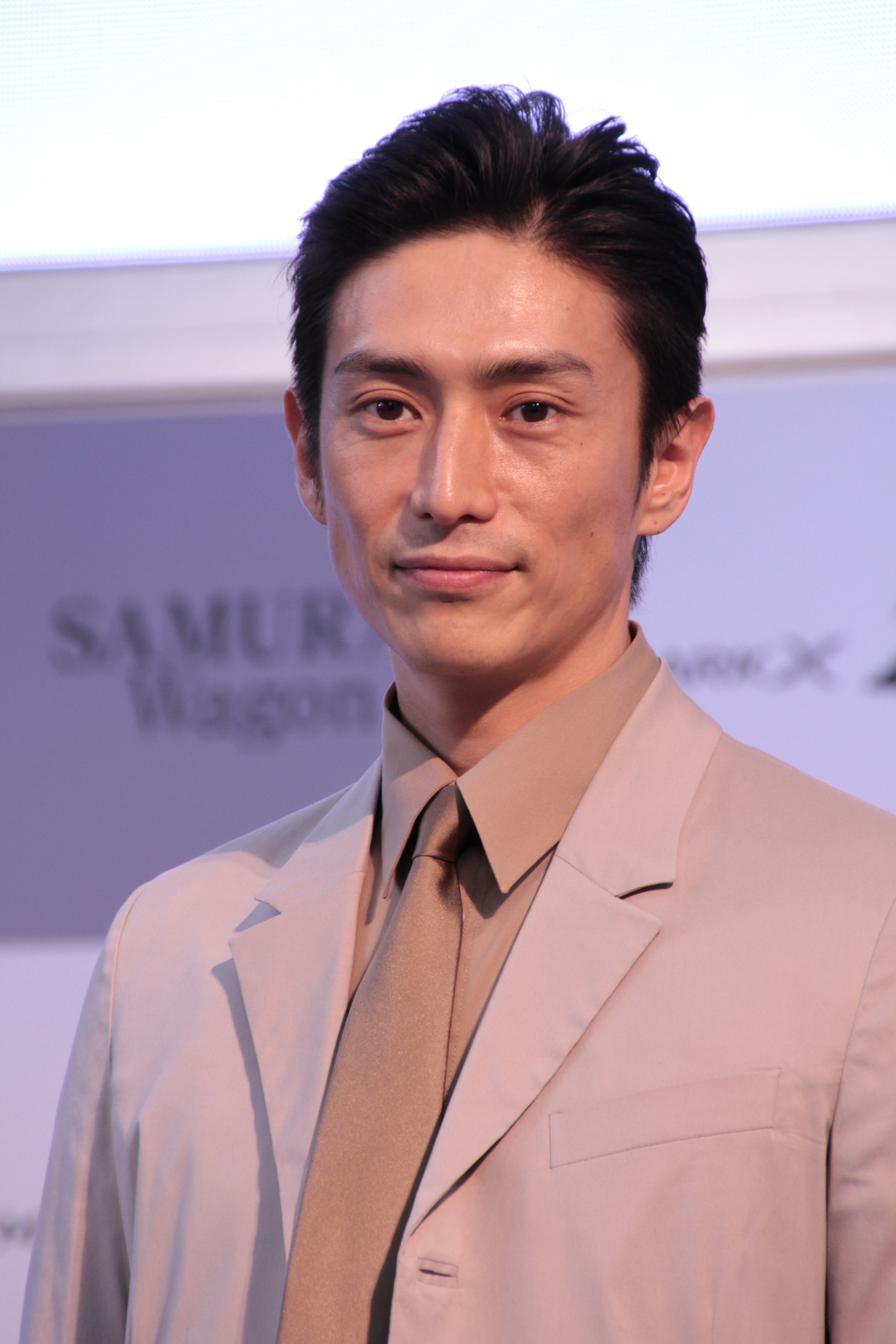
Yusuke Iseya portrays Shinomori in the live-action film adaptations.

Shinomori Aoshi is a ninja of the Oniwaban, who worked for the Shogunate government during the Edo period.^{[ch. 16]} At the suggestion of Kashiwazaki Nenji (better known as Okina), Shinomori was given the position of Okashira at the age of fifteen, in time for the Oniwabanshū to defend Edo Castle. As a member of the Oniwabanshū, he helped to raise Makimachi Misao from childhood. Misao, who was his protegee developed a strong admiration and romantic feelings for him. Aoshi is a grandmaster and Okashira of the Oniwabanshū shinobi. Aoshi's weapon of choice is a kodachi, a sword that is described in the series to act like a shield because its light weight makes it easy to block with. He originally used only one of these short swords for defense and relied mainly on kenpo for his offense, but later used a two-sworded style. Among several from his Kodachi nito Ryu, the Kaiten Kenbu Rokuren (回天剣舞・六連（かいてんけんぶ・ろくれん）; "Spinning-Heavenly Sword-Dance Six-Series" or "The Dance Of The Wheeling Sword Six Successions") is the strongest. After the revolution, since a few members of the Oniwabanshū were unable to adapt to life in the Meiji era, Aoshi and these members worked for the corrupt, power-hungry business man, Takeda Kanryū instead. During the early chapters of the manga, the Oniwabanshū work to capture doctor Takani Megumi under orders from Kanryu for his opium business. This leads them to clash with Kenshin and his allies. As the oniwaban are defeated by Kenshin and his friends, Kanryu betrays them and tries to kill them. Aoshi is the only survivor who escapes to become stronger to kill Kenshin and obtain the title of the strongest in favor of his dead subordinates.

Following his training, Shishio Makoto's forces hire Aoshi to aid them in their fight against Kenshin who is now aided by the remaining retired Oniwabanshu. This leads to Aoshi having to personally confront and nearly kill Okina. Misao is shocked to see how coldblooded Aoshi has become and tells Kenshin to kill him. Kenshin refuses, claiming that the Kaiten Kenbu should have killed Okina but Aoshi is still retaining his humanity. During their rematch, Kenshin wakes up Aoshi's past persona, telling him that his late partners would only be depressed and that Misao started crying of relief when he decided to bring back Aoshi. Despite being defeated by Kenshin, Aoshi feels relief but advises his enemy to be careful when using recently learned technique. When Kenshin is defeated by Shishio, Aoshi briefly replaces him as he states that Kenshin only lost due to his previous wounds. After Shishio dies in combat, the former Okashira stays in Kyoto meditating in regards to his actions but promises Kenshin he will gladly share tea with him the next time they meet.

In the final arc of the series, Aoshi and Misao are requested by Okina to take Yukishiro Tomoe's diary to Tokyo in hopes of reaching her brother's feelings, revengeful Enishi who seeks to torture and kill Kenshin. Once they reach Tokyo, Aoshi solves Yukishiro Enishi's trick of having orchestrated the fake death of Kamiya Kaoru. He then joins Saito Hajime in finding his hideout. After they are successful, Aoshi and Misao join Kenshin's group to rescue Kaoru from Enishi which Aoshi contributes by defeating one of his bodyguards. Following their victory, Aoshi and Kenshin their promised tea meal where the latter asks the former to follow a pacifist path like he did when he stopped being an assassin which Aoshi agrees. He and Misao then return to Kyoto but make a brief shortcut to plant flowers in their late allies' graves.

Outside the main series, Shinomori also appears in the series' liveaction films where he is portrayed by Yusuke Iseya. The New Kyoto Arc original video animations also retell his actions while working for Shishio. He is also playable in several video games.

== Reception ==
Daryl Surat of Otaku USA said that while, in Surat's view, Aoshi does not engage in "meaningful" battles, the character scored highly in popularity polls among readers because Aoshi appears "like a CLAMP character wearing Gambit's coat." Surat used Aoshi as an example of Rurouni Kenshin being a "neo-shonen" work that appeals to both boys and girls. T.H.E.M. Anime Reviews praised the Oniwabanshu organization for acting not like stereotypical villains and instead characters who could also work as heroes. Mania.com remarks the build up Aoshi, Saito and other characters bring to the story due to how they similar goals but felt that Misao's attempts to reach Aoshi might be annoying. Mania praised the second match between Shinomori and Kenshin despite the apparent rehash but noted there were parallels between both fighters with Sagara's line regarding how Shinomori is ready to die after the battle while Kenshin, on the other hand, comes across as a warrior who achieved a desire to survive to all battles. Similarly, Chris Beveridge from Mania Entertainment praised the build up the anime's Kyoto arc has had as after fighting so much build up in the too based on how Shinomori, Saito and Sagara try to back up the weakened Kenshin to aid him in defeating Shishio Makoto but the execution felt like a writer copout. Due to Kaoru, Kenshin and Sanosuke missing from the final arc during the Jinchu arc, Manga News described Aoshi as the star of the series' 24th volume due to how he explores the mysteries behind Enishi's revenge and his subsequent actions that made him stand out most notably because he had been absent for multiple chapters.

In analasyng the cast, Universidade de Sao Paulo said Shinomori is portrayed as a man strictly responsible over his men's loyalty and frustration with the past haunt and torment him, carrying the resentment of situations badly or unresolved. In his character, the reader can see the representation of the permanence of the Shogunate, as he avoids abandoning it. Therefore, he sets himself the goal of defeating the protagonist, as he was not only legendary but was also considered the strongest at the end of the Shogunate. Therefore, the feelings related to Aoshi are linked to the permanence of the previous historical moment that was not overcome despite the fact that a new Era, the Meiji, was already being experienced. Frustration, resentment, hurt, all this negativity is part of the construction of his trajectory, until the overcoming and transformation of his values to be adapted to the new moment that is being constructed. While Kenshin and Aoshi may be the extremes of the Meiji Restoration, Saito Hajime catalyzes the representation of the transition. Universidade Federal Fluminense said in Shinomori's goal was to defeat Kenshin due to the villain's anger towards the new government and the old Shogun. Feeling threatened, Takeda, an unscrupulous man who knows neither honor nor the samurai code, uses a modern, Western weapon: the machine gun. With it, the villain kills Aoshi's allies, who sacrifice themselves for their leader, in a clear conflict between tradition and modernity themes.

Iseya's portrayal of Shinomori also received mixed with snapthirty describing his character as "melodramatic" with a "vengeful demeanor", while J Generation also praised Shinomori's characterization for how he fits in Kyoto Inferno due to his connections with Shishio but lamented how he does not get to fight Kenshin in this film. Filmedinether felt that despite changes in regards to Shinomori's story from the original series, his character fits well into the manga and praised his fight scenes. Marcus Goh from Yahoo! regarded his duel with Kenshin as the best fight in the films. On the other hand, Anime News Network lamented the screentime the cast in general has in Kyoto Inferno as he and Misao "are shortchanged by the larger demands of the story." For the third film, the same site said that "the resolution for characters like Aoshi feels undercooked".
