= Makimachi Misao =

Fictional character from Rurouni Kenshin

- Rurouni Kenshin character
- Makimachi Misao on the cover of Rurouni Kenshin Kanzenban Volume 7
- First appearance: Rurouni Kenshin Act 62: On the East Sea Road
- Created by: Nobuhiro Watsuki
- Portrayed by: Tao Tsuchiya
- Voiced by: Japanese; Tomo Sakurai (1996 series); Aya Yamane (2023 series); English; Melodee Spevack (1996 series; Samurai X version); Philece Sampler (1996 series); Meg Bauman-Shideler (New Kyoto Arc); Brittney Karbowski (live-action films); Abby Espiritu (2023 series)

In-universe information
- Nickname: Weasel girl
- Affiliations: Oniwabanshū

Makimachi Misao (巻町 操) is a character from the fictional Rurouni Kenshin universe created by Nobuhiro Watsuki.

Misao is a 16-year-old girl and the youngest member of the ninja group called Oniwabanshū. She leaves her home to find her missing leader Shinomori Aoshi, but instead she encounters with Himura Kenshin during her journey to Kyoto alone. She soon proves herself a valuable ally and temporarily makes it to the status of leader. She develops strong romantic feelings for Aoshi.

== Character ==
Misao is a kunoichi (female ninja) from the Oniwabanshū clan of onmitsu (spies/ninja) previously based in Edo. Her weapon of choice is the kunai. She is about sixteen years old when she is first introduced. In the work, Misao is often compared to a weasel.

== Creation and conception ==
Misao was introduced because Watsuki believed that the Kyoto needed an extra heroine character to interact with Kenshin, since Kenshin and Kaoru were separate. He created Misao to be as "bright" as possible since the story was scheduled to be "in a dark direction." Watsuki added that "It's though Yahiko + Kaoru / 2 = Misao." The author of Rurouni Kenshin gave her an association with the Oniwabanshū, stemming from the reader suggestion of an Oniwabanshū kunoichi. To prevent additional complications in the storyline, Watsuki wanted Misao as a character who would not develop romantic feelings for Kenshin. Her design originates from Nakoruru in Samurai Shodown (Samurai Spirits); according to Watsuki he received criticism for this. Watsuki believes that she is closer to Mai Shiranui and Yuri Sakazaki from another SNK "battle-game." According to Watsuki the setup of the physical design occurred quickly as he "fussed" with an Oniwabanshū ninja outfit "a bit." Watsuki intended for Misao's face and body to resemble that of a young man. While Misao is 16, Watsuki wanted her to appear like a 13-year-old. Watsuki argued with his editors about the inclusion of Misao's braid. Ultimately it was kept since it added emphasis to Misao's movements. Watsuki said that he added the cloak "just for fun." The creator of Rurouni Kenshin intended for her to have a "painful" encounter with Aoshi in the future, but that Misao would "keep going strong." Watsuki said that he enjoyed drawing Misao. Her family name originates from a place where Watsuki lived in Niigata.

== Background ==
Misao is the granddaughter of the former Okashira of the Oniwabanshū. She was in the care of the last leader of the Oniwabanashū, Shinomori Aoshi, until Aoshi, Han'nya, Shikijō, Beshimi, and Hyottoko left her to Kashiwazaki Nenji, also known as Okina of the Oniwabanashū, when she was eight. She and Okina had a strong bond, though in Misao's mind, Aoshi remained the best. She also had a special affection for Han'nya, who was always the one to take care of her and taught her how to fight. When she heard that Aoshi was in Tokyo, she went to search for him and ran into Himura Kenshin on the way back to Kyoto.

== Kyoto Arc ==
While resting in a forest on the way to Kyoto to defeat Shishio Makoto, Kenshin notices a teenage girl, Misao, defeat four bandits and take their goods. He interrupts her midway through the altercation, but she views him as a bum. She attempts to take his sword but Kenshin easily avoids her attacks. She and Kenshin then began traveling to Kyoto together. They stop near Shingetsu Village, where they meet a young boy. He tells them that his village is under the control of Shishio Makoto. Misao and Kenshin, later accompanied by Saitō Hajime, free the village. As the story progresses, Misao, who has become rather attached to Kenshin, becomes angry at him for not depending on anyone else. After Kenshin leaves, she met Kamiya Kaoru and Myōjin Yahiko. She recognizes a picture of Kenshin posted on the wall of a restaurant called Shirobeko. Misao takes Kaoru and Yahiko to Kenshin at his Hiko Seijūrō's home. On the way back, Yahiko remembers that he forgot to warn Kenshin about Aoshi, who he had seen in Kyoto a few days before, and says it out loud. Misao had heard of this and demands to know about Aoshi; Kaoru complies, grateful for the chance to see Kenshin again.

Misao was shocked at the news of Han'nya's and the others' deaths, and she runs back to Aoi-Ya for clarification from Okina. She discovers that Okina went to fight Aoshi, and leaves immediately. She arrives too late to stop the fight and finds Okina barely alive; Aoshi declares he never wishes to see Misao again. She was also given a letter written by Okina in case he was to die, telling her that she should forget about Aoshi and Oniwabanshu so she can lead a normal life. She has difficulty accepting Aoshi is the one who attempted to kill Okina. She declares herself as the new Okashira of the Oniwabanashū, refusing to recognize Aoshi as the clan's head any longer.

Misao becomes close friends with Kenshin, Kaoru, and Yahiko, helping them fight the agents of Shishio Makoto. Before leaving for the final battle with Shishio, Kenshin promises Misao that he will bring Aoshi back home to Aoi-Ya, because he does not believe that Aoshi has lost himself completely. She was overwhelmed with this knowledge and cannot stop her own tears, especially because before Kenshin made his statement, Okina had asked him to kill Aoshi.

During the fight with members of the Ten Swords outside Aoi-Ya, Misao is knocked unconscious after fully receiving a hit from Honjō Kamatari's weapon. Han'nya appears before her in a dream and tells her that Kenshin has kept his promise and is bringing Aoshi back. She wakes up and helps Kaoru defeat Kamatari. She also knocks Kamatari out when he attempts to kill himself to atone for his defeat; she says she cannot truly understand the feelings of a homosexual man but was touched by his loyalty to Shishio. After all of the Ten Swords present are defeated, they are saved by Hiko Seijūrō and wait for Kenshin, Sanosuke, Saitō, and Aoshi to return.

Kenshin stays in Kyoto for about another month but decides to finally leave with Kaoru. Misao is sorely disappointed when her new friends decide to return to Tokyo, though Kenshin attempts to cheer her up by assigning her to get Aoshi to smile. Her attempts at comedy have little effect on Aoshi, though she does not have any intention of giving up.

== Revenge Arc ==
Misao later returns in the Jinchū arc of the story when Kaoru writes to her asking her to deliver Yukishiro Tomoe's diary to Tokyo before her brother Yukishiro Enishi can exact Jinchū on Kenshin.

She and Aoshi arrived with the diary just after Enishi has taken his revenge. Kaoru was dead and Kenshin has suffered a breakdown, going off to a village of lost men. Sagara Sanosuke attempts to reach Kenshin, but his friend is completely lost in his grief and Sano wanders away from Tokyo in despair. Misao and Yahiko also visit Kenshin and try to revive his spirit, but their efforts are useless, and they leave him. They swear to find Enishi, make him read Tomoe's diary, and beg for forgiveness at Kaoru's grave.

Aoshi deduces that Kaoru may not be dead. He exhumes Kaoru's grave and cuts open the body, proving that it is not Kaoru but an elaborate doll, one that could fool even Takani Megumi's medical expertise. Misao and Yahiko begin a search to find Kaoru. Sanosuke returns to the clinic to see Megumi and Kenshin has a dream in which Tomoe tells him that Kaoru is still alive. He also returns and gathers his friends, including Saitō.

They travel to Enishi's island, where Kaoru is being held. Guided by Aoshi, Misao sets off the bombs in the water surrounding the island, allowing the group to land safely. After Enishi is defeated, Aoshi decides to head back to Kyoto. Misao realizes Aoshi wants to leave so early because he wants to rebury Han'nya and the others in a "place with more sunlight". Misao is now happy to go home with "everyone", and Aoshi finally smiles.

In a bonus comic in Kenshin Kaden, Aoshi and Misao both attended a picnic where everyone is reunited. The only one who is not present is Sanosuke; who sends a letter from Mongolia that he is returning to Japan to be with his friends and Saitō; who is on assignment in Hokkaidō.

== Live action films ==
Misao has been played by Tao Tsuchiya in the three live-action sequels to the 2012 Rurouni Kenshin film.

== Reception ==
Watsuki stated that he received negative feedback letters regarding Misao and received some positive feedback letters "in response." Capsule Monsters Nevertheless, the critic praised the work of Meg Bauman as Misao's actress. Mania.com noted her Misao "provides a lot of comedic relief when it's needed, though her obsession with Aoshi borderlines on scary." Nevertheless, Mania enjoyed how the plot changes when she allies with Kenshin. Similarly, Misao's portrayal in the live-action was portrayed for balancing a dark narrative with her optimism. Nevertheless, the writer found that Misao's journey to find Shinomori might give her a grim fate as result of what happened to her friends. Kotaku claimed that despite the liveactions have a large cast, Misao and her allies from the Oniwabanshu are well developed. EfilmCritic felt that Misao's dynamic with Kenshin was a departure from the series' status quo of Kenshin being affiliated with the Kamiya Kasshin Ryu Dojo but still felt all characters were properly addressed. Decider praised the focus on Misao and Saito as the play a major role in Rurouni Kenshin: The Final.
