= Kamiya Kaoru =

Fictional character from Rurouni Kenshin

- Rurouni Kenshin character
- Kamiya Kaoru on the cover of Rurouni Kenshin Kanzenban Volume 4
- First appearance: Rurouni Kenshin Act 1: Kenshin ● Himura Battōsai
- Created by: Nobuhiro Watsuki
- Portrayed by: Emi Takei
- Voiced by: Japanese; Tomo Sakurai (drama CD); Miki Fujitani (1996 anime series); Rie Takahashi (2023 anime series); English; Reba West (1996 anime series, Sony dub); Dorothy Melendrez (1996 anime series, Bang Zoom! dub); Kara Bliss (Requiem for the Ishin Patriots); Katherine Catmull (Reflection); Amanda Hanawa (New Kyoto Arc); Alexis Tipton (live-action films); Risa Mei (2023 anime series)

In-universe information
- Aliases: Kory Kamiya (anime, Sony dub only)
- Title: Master of Kamiya Kasshin-ryū
- Relatives: Kamiya Koshijirou (father); Himura Kenshin (husband); Himura Kenji (son)

Kamiya Kaoru (神谷 薫), known as Kaoru Kamiya in the Media Blasters English-language dub and Kori Kamiya in the English Sony Samurai X dub, is a fictional character in the Rurouni Kenshin manga created by Nobuhiro Watsuki. In the story Kaoru is the instructor of a kendo school in Tokyo, Kamiya Kasshin-ryū (神谷活心流). The students leave when many people are killed by someone claiming to be the Hitokiri Battōsai (人斬り抜刀斎) from the Kamiya Kasshin-ryū", damaging the school's reputation. Kaoru is saved from the murderous impostor by the real Battōsai, Himura Kenshin, now a wanderer who has sworn to stop killing. During the series, Kaoru grows fond of Kenshin due to his good actions to society and becomes his ally.

Kaoru also appears in the film version of the series and other media of the franchise, including electronic games and a series of original video animations (OVAs). Although Watsuki wanted to design Kaoru "more cutely" and to be "more fashionable", he toned down those qualities and made her poor and "down-to-earth". There was concern that Watsuki would kill her off, with her critical reception having been mostly positive.

== Appearances ==
=== Rurouni Kenshin ===
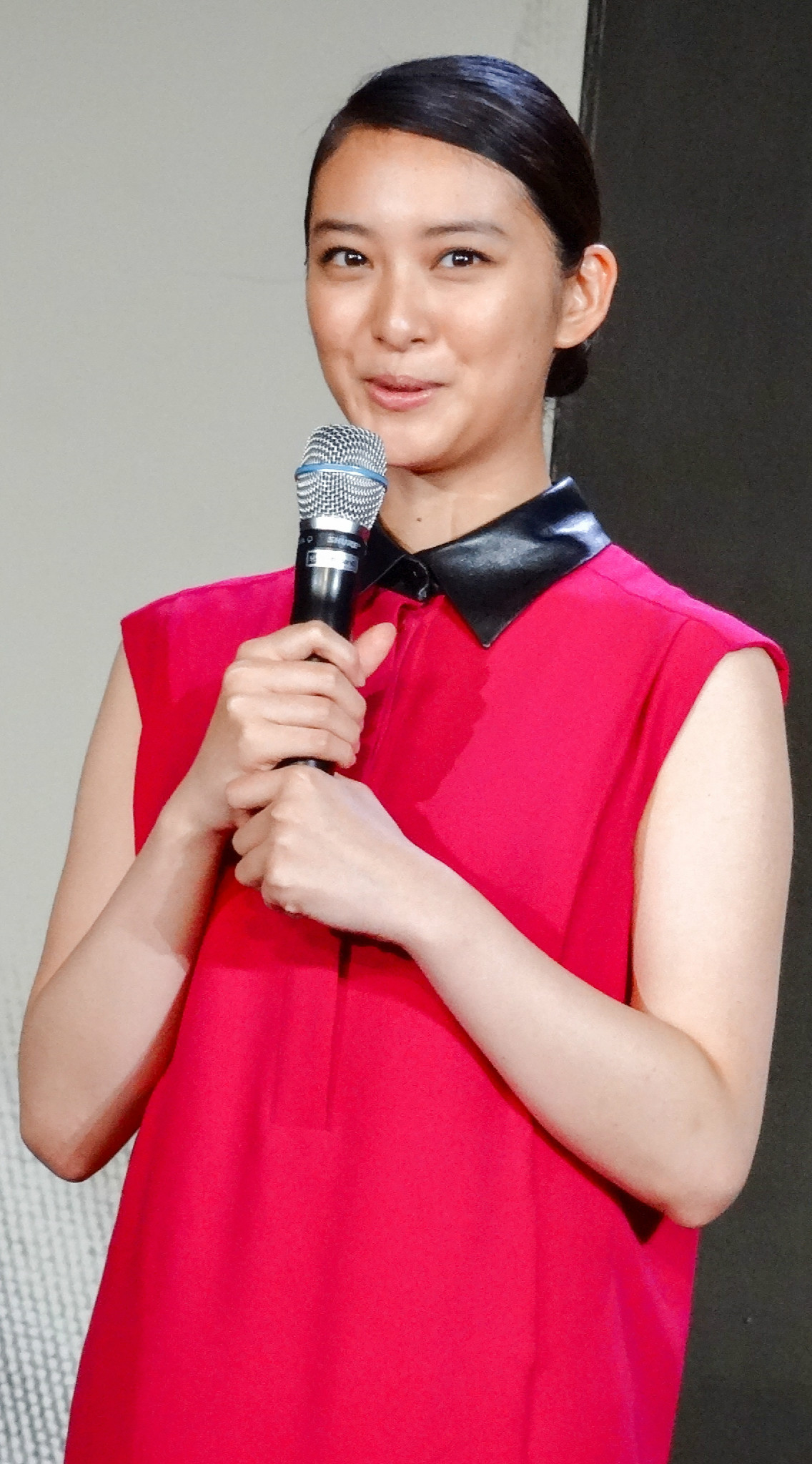
Emi Takei, who played Kamiya Kaoru in live-action films

Kaoru is the instructor of the Kamiya Kasshin martial-arts school. She inherited her fighting style and a small dojo from her father, who was drafted by a police swordsmen unit and died defending a comrade during the Seinan War. At the beginning of the story, Kaoru has no students and runs the dojo alone; she seems likely to lose it when Kenshin helps her. Despite occasional mood swings and a reputation for bad cooking, she is independent, compassionate, courageous and a good fighter. In her first appearance, Kaoru searches for the assassin Hitokiri Battosai, who claims to be from Kamiya Kasshin-ryu. Kaoru is saved by the real Battosai, Himura Kenshin, and invites him to her dojo. One of her greatest fears is that Kenshin might return to wandering, leaving her alone again, and she is jealous if another girl (such as Takani Megumi) is interested in him. In the series' first story arc, Kaoru gains a student (Myojin Yahiko) and loses one (Tsukayama Yutaro).

When the Meiji government requests Kenshin's aid to kill the former Hitokiri Shishio Makoto, he bids Kaoru an emotional farewell and leaves for Kyoto. Kaoru falls into a depression before she follows him to Kyoto after a pep talk from Megumi. With the Oniwabanshu's Makimachi Misao, she defeats one of Shishio's Juppongatana: Honjō Kamatari.

In Tokyo, after Kaoru learns about Yukishiro Enishi's plans to kill everyone connected to Kenshin she teaches Yahiko the ougi of the Kamiya Kasshin. Enishi says that his goal is not to kill Kenshin, but to make him suffer by killing the person most important to him: Kaoru. He kidnaps her, leaving a replica of her dead body. Convinced that he again failed to save the one who was most important to him, Kenshin flees to the Fallen Village and falls into a catatonic depression. When he learns that Kaoru is alive, he and the group rescue her from Enishi. They marry and have a son, Himura Kenji. Five years later, after taking in Hasegawa Ashitaro, Inoue Aran, and Kubota Asahi into the Kamiya dojo, Kaoru receives information from them that her father is presumably alive and living in Hokkaido, prompting her and her family to travel there in the hopes of reuniting with him.

=== Other media ===
In Rurouni Kenshin: Reflection, although Kenshin and Kaoru are married he begins wandering again because he needs to help others; he returns every couple of years. Kaoru lets him go, promising to welcome him home with a smile and their child. Kenshin develops a mysterious disease, and Kaoru convinces him to transmit it to her. He leaves to help people in the First Sino-Japanese War, as he had promised the Meiji government. When he returns to Japan, Kenshin collapses in Kaoru's arms and dies. In the pilot issue of Rurouni: Meiji Swordsman Romantic Story, first published in 1992, Kaoru is the sister of Megumi and Yahiko. Many of the character's details changed in her transition to mainstream manga. Kaoru appears in all Rurouni Kenshin video games (including Jump Super Stars and Jump Ultimate Stars), primarily as a supporting character. In the manga reboot Rurouni Kenshin: Restoration, Kaoru works for Takeda Kanryū to regain her dojo. After Kenshin defeats Takeda, she continues living in the dojo with Kenshin and his friends. Kaoru was played by Emi Takei in 2012's Rurouni Kenshin and its three sequels.

== Concept ==
Watsuki said that he used "no specific model" and "no specific motif" in designing Kaoru, saying that if he had to name one model it would be Chiba Sanako, who was Sakamoto Ryōma's fiancée. He wanted to include the "commanding" qualities of Sasaki Mifuyu (佐々木 三冬) from Shōtarō Ikenami's Kenkaku Shōbai (剣客商売). According to Watsuki, Kaoru is a "plain, regular girl" despite her commanding qualities. By the first Japanese compilation, he thought that the character worked and many female Rurouni Kenshin readers identified with Kaoru. At the time, Watsuki had not decided if Kaoru would be Kenshin's love interest. Although he wanted to design Kaoru "more cutely" and to be "more fashionable", he toned down those qualities and made her poor and "down-to-earth". The artist described her ponytail as "de rigueur" for a girl practicing kendo. According to Watsuki, he enjoys drawing Kaoru but filling in her hair is "sometimes a pain." At the end of Rurouni Kenshin, Kaoru received a new hairstyle. Watsuki felt that Kaoru would look odd without her ponytail, but her original hairstyle did not look maternal and he changed it for the ending. When female readers asked Watsuki if Kaoru was a strong fighter, he called the character "quite independent for her age" who could "hold her own" against the local dojo masters and compete at the national level (although she is weaker than Kenshin and Sagara Sanosuke).

Watsuki said that in volume seven the series took on a more adult tone, influenced by the shōjo manga he was reading at the time. During the series he considered killing Kaoru off, deciding against it in favor of a happy ending for a manga aimed at young readers and influenced by the previous story arc's upbeat ending. However, he thought the storyline then lost its main theme (revenge); readers praised and criticized the twist. Watsuki apologized to his young audience for the dark chapters suggesting that Kaoru was dead. Miki Fujitani (who voices the character) said in an interview that in the OVA series Kaoru is brave and very different from her original version whose characterization has been felt closer to the calm Yukishiro Tomoe. Watsuki described Tomo Sakurai's CD-drama voice as "not too airhead-y," "not too high" and "not too low."

== Reception ==
Kaoru has been popular with Rurouni Kenshin readers, placing fourth or fifth in every popularity poll. Kaoru merchandise includes plushes, keychains and sweatbands. Manga, anime and video-game publications have responded positively to Kaoru; in T.H.E.M. Anime Reviews, Carlos Ross called her a "spirited girl". Kaoru and Kenshin's relationship ranked eighth in About.com's "Top 8 Anime Love Stories", with Katherine Luther calling it a "classic romance." Rebecca Silverman of Anime News Network was disappointed by Kaoru's lack of development in the series Rurouni Kenshin Restoration. SciFi.com liked her character due to how Kaoru does not see Kenshin as the past murderer Battosai but instead as a kind wanderer who wants protect others. The writer also enjoyed the good actions Kaoru does like protecting Yahiko in early episodes. Megan Lavey from Mania Entertainment found Kaoru more appealing in the manga version over the anime adaptation due to that, while in both versions it is obvious that she has romantic feelings for Kenshin, in the manga she has a better understanding of Kenshin's darker persona most notably when former assassin prepares to leave Tokyo. For the final arc in the manga, Mania Entertainment felt that twist that happens shortly after Kenshin's battle with Enishi helps to show why Kaoru loves Kenshin carefully.

Kaoru's Reflection OVA series version was criticized; Efrain Diaz Jr. of IGN wrote that although some of Kenshin and Kaoru's private moments are touching, others are depressing. According to Anime News Network's Mike Crandol, Kaoru is the least visually successful character redesign in the Reflection OVA. Citing the manga version's "distinctive girlish charm", Crandol said that the staff members tried too hard to make her look like Yukishiro Tomoe. Don Houston from DVD Talk noted the controversy between the fandom as they refrained from treating Reflection as canon due to how tragic the life of Kaoru and Kenshin's family became. About.com's Serdar Yegulalp felt the romance between Kaoru and Kenshin was entertaining to watch but at the same time criticized they often acted out of character, commenting on how Kaoru lets her husband leave the house in contrast to how in the original series, Kenshin left Tokyo while still not married with her. Ridwan Khan from Animefringe praised the romance between Kaoru and Kenshin, feeling it was well developed in the OVAs and served as a fitting finale to the series. On a more negative review, Carl Kimlinger stated that Kaoru was one of the most damaged characters in the OVAs as a result of being a more stereotypical female character waiting for her husband to come back home rather than Watsuki's original version where Kaoru would not allow Kenshin to leave or instead go with him when he leaves Tokyo to work. According to Ashley D. Lake from UC Riverside, Kaoru represents the Daitō-ryū Aiki-jūjutsu values defied in the Meiji era that Kenshin chooses to protect due to the values it offers to people, something rare in anime series due to prominent violence during the time Rurouni Kenshin premiered in Japan.

ABC CBN's Karen Flores praised Emi Takei's portrayal of the character in the first live-action film, stating the actress played her character just like the one from the manga and anime. However, she was criticized for lacking her tomboyish traits when interacting with the young Myojin Yahiko. The lack of the love triangle between Kaoru, Kenshin and Takani Megumi was criticized by Ko Ransom from Anime News Network, as the writer noted the first film covered too many subplots. David West from Neo lamented Kaoru had few appearances in the final film, citing her role in the previous ones appealing.
