= List of Rurouni Kenshin chapters =

Cover of the first tankōbon volume, released by Shueisha on September 2, 1994

The chapters of the Rurouni Kenshin manga series were written and illustrated by Nobuhiro Watsuki. The first chapter premiered in Shueisha's Weekly Shōnen Jump in 1994 and the series ran in the magazine until 1999. Set during the early Meiji period, it follows a former assassin named Himura Kenshin, who has become a wanderer that protects the people of Japan.

The 255 individual chapters known as "Acts", as well as a few one-shots authored by Watsuki were collected and published in 28 tankōbon volumes by Shueisha. The first volume was released on September 2, 1994, and the last on November 4, 1999. They re-released the series in a 22-volume kanzenban edition between July 4, 2006, and May 2, 2007. Shueisha published a 14-volume bunkoban edition between January 18, 2012, and July 18, 2012. A single chapter follow up to the series, Yahiko no Sakabatō (弥彦の逆刃刀; lit. "Yahiko's Reversed-Edge Sword"), was originally published in Weekly Shōnen Jump after the conclusion of the series. The chapter is focused on Myōjin Yahiko some time after the end of the series when he is requested to take care of a dojo for a short time. Left out of the original volumes, the chapter added as an extra to the final kanzenban release.

The first eighteen volumes were adapted into an anime produced by Studio Deen, and aired in Japan from January 10, 1996, to September 8, 1998. Additionally, several parts of the following volumes were adapted into two original video animations series.

Rurouni Kenshin was licensed for an English-language release in North America by Viz Media. The first volume of the series was released on October 7, 2003. The first volumes were published irregularly, but a monthly basis was established by Viz media after volume seven due to good sales and consumer demands. The last volume was published on July 5, 2006. Yahiko no Sakabatō was also serialized in Shonen Jump during 2006. Between January 29, 2008, and March 16, 2010, Viz re-released the manga in a nine-volume omnibus format called "Viz Big Edition", which collects three volumes in one. The ninth and final volume includes Yahiko no Sakabato and Cherry Blossoms in Spring. They released a similar "3-in-1 Edition" across nine volumes between January 3, 2017, and January 1, 2019.

== Volumes ==
No.	Title	Original release date	English release date
1	Meiji Swordsman Romantic Story; Kenshin Himura Battōsai (剣心·緋村抜刀斎)	September 2, 1994; 978-4-08-871499-8	October 7, 2003; 978-1-5911-6220-9
Act 001. "Kenshin ● Himura Battōsai" (剣心·緋村抜刀斎); Act 002. "Rurouni in the City" (流浪人·街へ行く, Rurōni Machi e Iku); Act 003. "Tokyo Samurai" (東京府士族·明神弥彦, Tōkyō-fu Shizoku: Myōjin Yahiko); Act 004. "Kasshin-ryū Reborn" (活心流·再始動, Kasshin-ryū: Saishidō); Act 005. "The Fight Merchant" (喧嘩の男, Kenka no Otoko); Act 006. "Face Off: Sagara Sanosuke" (対決·相楽左之助, Taiketsu: Sagara Sanosuke); "End-of-Volume Special (1): "Rurouni Meiji Swordsman Romantic Story" (特別編① るろうに-明治剣客浪漫譚-, Tokubetsuhen 1: "Rurōni -Meiji Kenkaku Romantan-)
During the 11th year of Meiji (1878), a peaceful wanderer called Himura Kenshin, formerly known as Hitokiri Battōsai, arrives in Tokyo, where he meets Kamiya Kaoru whose swordsmanship school is in danger as a murderer from the city claims to be from that school. After investigating, Kenshin defeats the murderer using his sakabatō sword, which has a reversed blade, making it almost impossible to kill someone. When Kenshin decides to leave Tokyo, Kaoru offers him a place to live in her dojo. During his stay in the dojo, Kenshin rescues an orphan called Myōjin Yahiko from a group of yakuza and takes him to live and train in the dojo. A few days later, a fight merchant named Sagara Sanosuke is hired to attack Kenshin. The volume ends with the second Rurouni Meiji Swordsman Romantic Story one-shot, which Watsuki calls a "side-story".
2	The Two Hitokiri; Hitokiri Futari (人斬りふたり)	December 2, 1994; 978-4-08-871500-1	November 26, 2003; 978-1-5911-6249-0
Act 007. "Mark of Evil" (悪一文字, Aku Ichimonji); Act 008. "And Then, Another" (そして仲間がまた一人, Soshite Nakama ga mata Hitori); Act 009. "Kurogasa" (黒笠); Act 010. "One Side of the Soul" (心の一方, Shin no Ippō); Act 011. "The Ribbon That Binds" (リボンとわがまま, Ribon to Wagamama); Act 012. "The Two Hitokiri" (人斬りふたり, Hitokiri Futari); Act 013. "The Meaning of the Name" (志士名の由来, Shishi Na no Yurai); Act 014. "End Beneath the Moon" (月下終焉, Gekka Shūen); Act 015. "Beauty on the Run" (逃走麗女, Tōsō Reijo)
The fight between Kenshin and Sanosuke results in Sanosuke being defeated. Sanosuke realizes that Kenshin is different from the Ishin Shishi that destroyed his unit, the Sekihō Army. He becomes Kenshin's best friend and fighting partner. Soon both are hired to protect Tani Jūsanrō, an ex-Ishin Shishi, from a hitokiri called Udo Jin-e. Jin-e encounters Kenshin and after seeing how weak he is compared to the Bakumatsu period, he decides to kill him. The next day, Kaoru, worried about Kenshin, goes to talk with him but she is kidnapped by Jin-e. Furious, Kenshin defeats Jin-e, but Kaoru pleads with him not to become an assassin again and Jin-e commits suicide. A few days later, Sanosuke and Kenshin defeat a group of men working for an industrialist called Takeda Kanryū that were pursuing Takani Megumi, a woman who has been producing opium.
3	A Reason to Act; Ugoku Wake (動く理由)	February 2, 1995; 978-4-08-871503-2	January 14, 2004; 978-1-5911-6250-6
Act 016. "Megumi, Kanryū, and..." (恵、観柳そして･･･, Megumi, Kanryū soshite...); Act 017. "The Oniwabanshū Strike" (御庭番強襲, Oniwaban Kyōshū); Act 018. "Team Kenshin" (剣心組奮迅, Kenshin-gumi Funjin); Act 019. "Daughter of Aizu" (会津の娘, Aizu no Musume); Act 020. "A Reason to Act" (動(うご)く理由(ワケ), Ugoku Wake); Act 021. "The Storm Breaks" (疾風怒濤, Shippū Dotō); Act 022. "Attack on Kanryū Mansion" (観柳邸突入, Kanryūtei Totsunyū); "End-of-Volume Special (2): "Rurouni Meiji Swordsman Romantic Story" (特別編② るろうに-明治剣客浪漫譚-, Tokubetsuhen 2: "Rurōni -Meiji Kenkaku Romantan-)
After defeating Takeda Kanryū's men, Kenshin and Sanosuke discover that Kanryu is protected by the last members of the Oniwabanshū group. Sanosuke is angry at Megumi for producing opium because a friend of his died from an opium overdose, but Kenshin decides to protect her. That night they are attacked by two members of the Oniwabanshū called Hyottoko and Beshimi. Sanosuke defeats Hyottoko, but Megumi is attacked by Beshimi. Yahiko tries to protect her but is hit by one of Beshmi's poison darts. It turns out Megumi is a doctor and she is able to save his life. She decides to leave the dojo rather than endanger anyone else, but Kenshin and Kaoru ask her to stay. Feeling guilty about the deaths she caused by producing opium, Megumi goes to Kanryū's mansion in order to kill him. She is taken prisoner and Kenshin and Yahiko decide to rescue her. Sanosuke is still angry at her but agrees to go along and they attack the mansion. The volume ends with the first one-shot of Rurouni Meiji Swordsman Romantic Story, which Watsuki calls the "pilot."
4	Dual Conclusions; Futatsu no Ketsumatsu (二つの結末)	April 4, 1995; 978-4-08-871504-9	April 14, 2004; 978-1-5911-6251-3
Act 023. "The Martial-Artist and the Spy" (隠密拳法家·般若, Onmitsu Kenpō-ka: Hannya); Act 024. "Savage Han'nya, Honorable Shikijō" (壮烈の般若、創痍の式尉, Sōretsu no Hannya, Sōi no Shikijō); Act 025. "Duel of the Masters" (豪腕対決, Gōwan Taiketsu); Act 026. "Shinomori Aoshi, Okashira" (御頭·四之森蒼紫, O-kashira: Shinomori Aoshi); Act 027. "Battle's Heat" (激闘, Gekitō); Act 028. "Battle's End" (死闘の果て, Shitō no Hate); Act 029. "Dual Conclusions: Megumi" (二つの結末-恵-, Futatsu no Ketsumatsu -Megumi-); Act 030. "Dual Conclusions: Aoshi" (二つの結末-蒼紫-, Futatsu no Ketsumatsu -Aoshi-)
When Kenshin, Sanosuke and Yahiko enter the mansion, they are challenged by Han'nya. Kenshin battles him while Sanosuke fights Shikijō. They defeat them and find their leader Shinomori Aoshi. Although Aoshi succeeds in wounding Kenshin, he is defeated by him. Kanryū then betrays Aoshi and attempts to kill him with a Gatling gun. Aoshi's men die protecting him from the bullets and Kenshin disables Kanryū. Kenshin's group then finds Megumi, who thanks them for trying to save her. She then attempts to stab herself, but is prevented by Sanosuke, who catches the blade with his bare hand. He tells her he forgives her for the death of his friend, and Kenshin convinces her that the only way to atone for the deaths she caused is by using her skill as a doctor to help others. Before leaving the mansion, they find Aoshi, shocked over his comrades' deaths, and Kenshin promises him another fight in the future in the hope that it will calm him.
5	The State of Meiji Swordsmanship; Meiji Kenjutsu Moyō (明治剣術模様)	June 2, 1995; 978-4-08-871505-6	June 16, 2004; 978-1-5911-6320-6
Act 031. "Bonus Story: Yahiko's Battle (1)" (番外編·弥彦の闘い(前編), Bangaihen: Yahiko no Tatakai (Zenpen)); Act 032. "Bonus Story: Yahiko's Battle (2)" (番外編·弥彦の闘い(中編), Bangaihen: Yahiko no Tatakai (Chūhen)); Act 033. "Bonus Story: Yahiko's Battle (3)" (番外編·弥彦の闘い(後編), Bangaihen: Yahiko no Tatakai (Kōhen)); Act 034. "The State of Meiji Swordsmanship" (明治剣術模様, Meiji Kenjutsu Moyō); Act 035. ""That Man" ● Raijūta" (その男·雷十太, Sono Otoko: Raijūta); Act 036. "Secret Sword" (秘剣, Hiken); Act 037. "Meeting at Tsukayama Garden" (塚山庭園会談, Tsukayama Teien Kaidan); Act 038. "Yutarō's Skill" (由太郎の腕前, Yutarō no Udemae); Act 039. "Clash" (衝突, Shōtotsu)
Yahiko begins working in the Akabeko restaurant and meets Sanjō Tsubame, who is forced to help her "master" Nagaoka Mikio steal from the restaurant. When Yahiko discovers this, he challenges the man and defeats him. Later, during a practice with another dojo, a man named Isurugi Raijūta attacks and almost kills the teacher of the dojo. Kenshin spars with him, and being impressed with his abilities, Raijūta asks Kenshin to join his group. Kenshin declines the offer. At this time, Kenshin and his friends meet Raijūta's student, Tsukayama Yutarō, and after discovering he was never taught swordsmanship they ask him to be a student of the Kamiya Kasshin-ryū.
6	No Worries; Shinpai Muyō (心配無用)	August 4, 1995; 978-4-08-871506-3	August 3, 2004; 978-1-5911-6356-5
Act 040. "The Ideal Man" (理想の男, Risō no Otoko); Act 041. "The Second Secret Sword" (もうひとつの秘剣, Mō Hitotsu no Hiken); Act 042. "You've No Idea" (お前は知らない, Omae wa Shiranai); Act 043. "Settling the Score" (決着, Ketchaku); Act 044. "No Worries" (心配無用, Shinpai Muyō); Act 045. "Extra: Sanosuke & Nishiki Paintings (1)" (番外編·左之助と錦絵(前編), Bangaihen: Sanosuke to Nishiki-e (Zenpen)); Act 046. "Extra: Sanosuke & Nishiki Paintings (2)" (番外編·左之助と錦絵(中編), Bangaihen: Sanosuke to Nishiki-e (Chūhen)); Act 047. "Extra: Sanosuke & Nishiki Paintings (3)" (番外編·左之助と錦絵(後編), Bangaihen: Sanosuke to Nishiki-e (Kōhen)); "End-of-Volume Special (3): "Crescent Moon in the Warring States" (特別編③ 戦国の三日月, Tokubetsuhen 3: "Sengoku no Mikazuki)
A few days after Yūtarō begins training in the Kamiya Kasshin Ryū, the dojo is attacked by Raijūta, who wants to kill Kenshin since he refused his offer. In the initial fight, Raijūta wounds Yūtarō, nearly severing his right arm. Seeing his indifference to his pupil's plight, Kenshin is angered and challenges him to another duel later. Although Kenshin's own right arm was injured in the previous fight, he defeats Raijūta, breaking the latter's will as a swordsman. In order to heal Yūtarō, his father decides to take him to Germany, where medicine is more advanced. Yūtarō is severely depressed about the injury to his arm, believing he can never learn swordsmanship now, but Yahiko attacks him and forces him to defend himself. He realizes he can still practice swordsmanship with his left arm and challenges Yahiko to a rematch in the future. Sanosuke discovers another survivor from the Sekihō Army, his old friend Katsuhiro, now an artist going under the name Tsukioka Tsunan. Tsunan is still haunted by the past and hatred of the Meiji government and wants to bomb the headquarters of the Meiji Government. Seeing that this would not be what their captain wanted, Sanosuke stops him with Kenshin's help. The volume ends with the debut one-shot of Watsuki titled Crescent Moon in the Warring States.
7	In the 11th Year of Meiji, May 14th Meiji Jūichinen Gogatsu Jūyokka (明治十一年五月十四日)	October 4, 1995; 978-4-08-871507-0	October 12, 2004; 978-1-5911-6357-2
Act 048. "Resurrection of the Wolf" (蘇る狼, Yomigaeru Ōkami); Act 049. "Wolf Without Mercy" (豺狼, Sairō); Act 050. "Scheme" (蠢動, Shundō); Act 051. "Confrontation" (対峙, Taiji); Act 052. "The Wolf's Fang" (牙を剥く狼, Kiba o Muku Ōkami); Act 053. "Agreement" (呼応, Koō); Act 054. "The One Who Stops the Two" (二人を止める者, Futari o Tomerumono); Act 055. "Enter Ōkubo" (大久保利通の依頼, Ōkubo Toshimichi no Irai); Act 056. "Meiji 11, May 14th — Morning" (明治十一年五月十四日-午前-, Meiji Jūichinen Gogatsu Jūyokka -Gozen-); Act 057. "Meiji 11, May 14th — Afternoon" (明治十一年五月十四日-午後-, Meiji Jūichinen Gogatsu Jūyokka -Gogo-)
Saitō Hajime, a former Shinsengumi member, comes to the Kamiya Kasshin-ryū dojo posing as a medical herb peddlar. Everyone but Sanosuke is out, and Sano quickly realizes from the sword calluses on Saitō's hands that he is an imposter. Saitō attacks Sanosuke, leaving him as a calling card for Kenshin, along with clues to his true identity. Meanwhile, Megumi runs into Kenshin, Kaoru, and Yahiko and returns to the dojo with them, where they find Sanosuke in critical condition. While Megumi is able to save Sano's life, it is three days and nights before he wakes up. Saitō sends a challenge to Kenshin, who goes out to fight him and meets a man Saitō set up to occupy Kenshin while he goes to the dojo. Kenshin easily defeats Saitō's pawn and returns to the dojo, where he recognizes Saitō, who attacks him. Kenshin reverts to his hitokiri personality, but as he and Saitō are about to kill each other, they are interrupted by the ex-Ishin Shishi Ōkubo Toshimichi. Ōkubo wants Kenshin to go to Kyoto and kill his hitokiri successor, Shishio Makoto, a man who is planning the overthrow of the Meiji Government. One week later, Ōkubo is killed by a soldier of Shishio and Kenshin decides to go to Kyoto alone to avoid any further danger to his friends. He says goodbye to Kaoru and leaves without a word to the others.
8	On the East Sea Road; Meiji Tōkaidōchū (明治東海道中)	December 1, 1995; 978-4-08-871508-7	November 9, 2004; 978-1-5911-6563-7
Act 058. "To Kyoto (Part I)" (京都へ…(前編), Kyōto e... (Zenpen)); Act 059. "To Kyoto (Part II)" (京都へ…(後編), Kyōto e... (Kōhen)); Act 060. "Megumi's Feelings — Kaoru's Feelings" (恵の気持ち·薫の気持ち, Megumi no Kimochi, Kaoru no Kimochi); Act 061. "Man Without Emotion" (無情の男, Mujō no Otoko); Act 062. "On the East Sea Road" (明治東海道中, Meiji Tōkaidōchū); Act 063. "Makimachi Misao" (巻町 操); Act 064. "Playing "It"" (鬼ごっこ, Onigokko); Act 065. "Each to His Own Path" (道中それぞれ, Dōchū Sorezore); Act 066. "The Abandoned Village" (見捨てられた村, Misuterareta Mura)
Furious that Kenshin broke his promise not to go wandering again without letting him know, Sanosuke decides to go to Kyoto to confront him. Saitō finds Sano at Katsu's, where he went to borrow money for the trip, and says that he is an amateur who will only endanger Kenshin and that he should stay in Tokyo. They fight and Saitō easily overpowers Sanosuke, who is still weakened from his earlier injuries. Sano still insists on going to Kyoto and Saitō decides to let him go. Meanwhile, Megumi goes to see Kaoru, who is severely depressed at Kenshin's departure. She convinces Kaoru to go to Kyoto, giving her some medicine that Kenshin said was valuable for wounds, and Yahiko and Kaoru leave Tokyo. On his way to Kyoto, Kenshin meets an Oniwabanshū named Makimachi Misao, who is searching for Aoshi without knowing what happened in Tokyo to the Oniwabanshū. Kenshin allows Misao to accompany him, but avoids telling her what happened to Aoshi. While on their journey, Kenshin and Misao find a village that has been conquered by Shishio. They meet a boy from the village named Mishima Eiji whose family was slaughtered by Shishio's soldiers.
9	Arrival in Kyoto; Kyōto Tōchaku (京都到着)	February 2, 1996; 978-4-08-871509-4	December 7, 2004; 978-1-5911-6669-6
Act 067. "Birth of a Small Champion" (小さな修羅の芽生え, Chiisa na Shura no Mebae); Act 068. "Portrait of Ambition" (野心家の肖像, Yashinka no Shōzō); Act 069. "The Tactics of Battle" (闘いの駆け引き, Tatakai no Kakehiki); Act 070. "The Sword of Heaven" (天剣の宗次郎, Tenken no Sōjirō); Act 071. "To Kyoto, Once More" (再び京都へ, Futatabi Kyōto e); Act 072. "Encounter in the Forest (Part I)" (森の出会い(前編), Mori no Deai (Zenpen)); Act 073. "Encounter in the Forest (Part II)" (森の出会い(後編), Mori no Deai (Kōhen)); Act 074. "Arrival in Kyoto" (京都到着, Kyōto Tōchaku); Act 075. "Searching for the Sakabatō" (逆刃刀を求めて, Sakabatō o Motomete)
Saitō catches up with Kenshin and after learning Shishio is in the village, they go to confront him. After meeting Shishio, Kenshin is attacked by Shishio's soldier, Senkaku. Kenshin easily defeats Senkaku but Shishio departs for Kyoto leaving Ōkubo's murderer, Seta Sōjirō, to fight Kenshin. The fight ends in a tie with both of their swords broken and the village is freed. While traveling to Kyoto, Sanosuke meets a fallen monk, Yūkyūzan Anji, who teaches him the Futae no Kiwami, a powerful technique that can pulverize rock. Sanosuke never learns that Anji is a soldier from Shishio but after he leaves Sōjirō turns up to get Anji. Kenshin and Misao arrive at Kyoto and meet Misao's guardian, Oniwabanshū Okina. Okina helps Kenshin find Seikū Arai, son of the creator of Kenshin's sakabatō sword, Shakkū Arai. Kenshin wants him to make another reverse-blade sword, but he refuses because he hates violence.
10	Mitsurugi, Master and Student; Mitsurugi no Shitei (御剣の師弟)	April 4, 1996; 978-4-08-871510-0	January 11, 2005; 978-1-5911-6703-7
Act 076. "The Ten Swords in Action" (十本刀動く, Juppongatana Ugoku); Act 077. "Prelude to Battle" (死(し)斗(とう)の幕(まく)開(あ)け, Shitō no Makuake); Act 078. "Chō of the Ten Swords" (十本刀·張, Juppongatana: Chō); Act 079. "The Thinnest Blade" (薄刃乃太刀, Hakujin no Tachi); Act 080. "Drawing of the Forbidden" (禁忌の抜刀, Kinki no Battō); Act 081. "Shakkū's Wish" (赤空の想い, Shakkū no Omoi); Act 082. "When the Strings Meet" (手繰りよる糸, Taguriyoru Ito); Act 083. "Hiko Seijūrō" (比古清十郎); Act 084. "The Mitsurugi Apprenticeship" (御剣の師弟, Mitsurugi no Shitei)
Shishio discovers Kenshin's location and sends Sawagejō Chō, one of the Juppongatana, to stop Kenshin from receiving a new sword. Chō loves swords and wants Shakkū's last sword for himself. When Seikū explains that his father's last sword was donated to a shrine, Chō kidnaps Seikū's son. Kenshin attempts to fight Chō without a sword, but he is soon overpowered. Seeing Kenshin willing to die to protect his son, Seikū runs into the shrine and gets his father's sword and tosses it to Kenshin. Chō threatens to kill Seikū's son and Kenshin strikes him with a killing blow from the sword. He then discovers that Shakkū's last sword was another sakabatō. Seikū gives Kenshin the sakabatō to keep, and Kenshin goes to his master, Hiko Seijūrō, to ask him to complete his training. Hiko does not think that Kenshin is going to be able to learn the final technique of the Hiten Mitsurugi style because of his history as a hitokiri. Meanwhile, Misao meets Yahiko and Kaoru and takes them to meet Kenshin.
11	Overture to Destruction; Hōkai no Jokyoku (崩壊の序曲)	June 4, 1996; 978-4-08-872281-8	February 2, 2005; 978-1-5911-6709-9
Act 085. "Half the Feeling" (気持ち半分, Kimochi Hanbun); Act 086. "Aoshi & Okina" (蒼紫と翁, Aoshi to Okina); Act 087. "Meeting of the Warlords" (修羅の会合, Shura no Kaigō); Act 088. "Overture to Destruction" (崩壊の序曲, Hōkai no Jokyoku); Act 089. "Aoshi vs. Okina" (蒼紫対翁, Aoshi tai Okina); Act 090. "Finale of Fresh Blood" (鮮血の終焉, Senketsu no Shūen); Act 091. "Misao's Decision" (操の決意, Misao no Ketsui); Act 092. "A Bird and a Broom" (トリとホウキと, Tori to Hōki to); Act 093. "The Man Named Usui" (その名は宇水, Sono Na wa Usui)
Kaoru and Yahiko catch up with Kenshin at Hiko's home and he sends Kenshin out and questions them about his apprentice's life since he saw him last. They tell him about Kenshin's vow not to kill and his struggles to redeem himself and atone for all the lives he has taken. Hiko decides to teach Kenshin the final technique after all and Kaoru, Yahiko, and Misao return to the Aoi-Ya to wait for him. While on the way back, Kaoru and Yahiko are surprised and alarmed to discover that Misao is a member of the Oniwabanshū. Misao in her turn is upset to discover that all her friends are dead and Aoshi has had some kind of breakdown. Meanwhile, Shishio meets Aoshi and offers him the opportunity to join forces. Aoshi is not interested in joining anyone, but he is willing to work with Shishio, since he wants to kill Kenshin. Knowing that the Oniwabanshū are sheltering Kenshin and his friends, Aoshi arranges a meeting with Okina. Okina is shocked that Aoshi has turned on the Oniwabanshū and they get into a fight. Aoshi leaves Okina badly injured and tells Misao he never wants to see her again. Misao takes over Aoshi's position as leader of the Oniwabanshū. Saitō arrives in Kyoto and finds Sanosuke in prison-he got himself arrested in order to find Saitō. Together they question Chō, who was turned over to the police by Kenshin, on what Shishio's plans are. Chō reveals that Shishio plans to conquer Japan by starting a fire in Kyoto and burning the city down. He also warns them of the power of the Juppongatana.
12	The Great Kyoto Fire; Kyōto Taika (京都大火)	September 4, 1996; 978-4-08-872282-5	March 1, 2005; 978-1-5911-6712-9
Act 094. "The Initiation Begins" (伝授開始, Denju Kaishi); Act 095. "Even If It Costs My Life" (命を捨てても…, Inochi o Sutetemo...); Act 096. "Between Life and Death" (生と死の間で…, Sei to Shi no Hazama de...); Act 097. "The Ten Swords Summoned" (十本刀集結, Juppongatana Shūketsu); Act 098. "The Other Objective" (もう一つの目的, Mō Hitotsu no Mokuteki); Act 099. "As If in Flight" (翔ぶが如く, Tobu ga Gotoku); Act 100. "The Great Kyoto Fire (Part I)" (京都大火(前編), Kyōto Taika (Zenpen)); Act 101. "The Great Kyoto Fire (Part II)" (京都大火(中編), Kyōto Taika (Chūhen)); Act 102. "The Great Kyoto Fire (Part III)" (京都大火(後編), Kyōto Taika (Kōhen))
Kenshin trains with Hiko, but finds himself unable to master the final technique. Hiko gives Kenshin one night to prepare, warning him that if he cannot find what is missing in himself, it will be his final duty as Kenshin's master to end his life. The next day, Hiko attacks Kenshin and in the process, Kenshin learns the Amakakeru Ryū no Hirameki. He also discovers that the passing of this final technique usually costs the life of the master, but due to the reverse-blade sword, Hiko is only wounded and makes a full recovery. Kenshin then returns to Kyoto, where he meets Saitō and Sanosuke. Learning that Shishio plans to burn Kyoto, Kenshin realizes that the fire is just a distraction. Shishio's real objective is to escape from Kyoto in his battleship, Rengoku, in order to attack the Meiji government. While Kenshin, Saitō and Sanosuke head out to stop Shishio, the Oniwabanshū issue warnings all over Kyoto about the plan to burn the city. Although Sadojima Hōji dismisses Sanosuke as a street thug of no importance, Sano is the one who destroys the Rengoku with bombs supplied by Tsunan. Shishio then realizes he must defeat Kenshin, Saitō and Sanosuke before he can attempt to take over Japan, and challenges them to a fight on Mount Hiei.
13	A Beautiful Night; Migoto na Yoru (見事な夜)	December 2, 1996; 4-08-872283-3	April 5, 2005; 978-1-5911-6713-6
Act 103. "After the Night" (一夜明けて, Ichiya Akete); Act 104. "Tears" (なみだ, Namida); Act 105. "A Beautiful Night" (見事な夜, Migoto na Yoru); Act 106. "As an Abomination" (蛇蝎の如く, Dakatsu no Gotoku); Act 107. "The Bright King" (明王, Myōō); Act 108. "The Difference in Strength" (力の差, Chikara no Sa); Act 109. "Conviction of the Fist" (拳の確信, Kobushi no Kakushin); Act 110. "A World Not Worth Saving" (救い難き世界, Sukuigataki Sekai); Act 111. "Conversation of the Fists" (拳の語らい, Kobushi no Katarai)
While Saitō makes the arrangements for the fight against Shishio, Kenshin and Sanosuke return to the Aoi-Ya, where they find Kaoru and Yahiko. Okina wants Kenshin to end Aoshi's life, but Kenshin believes there is still a chance to save him and promises Misao that he will bring him back. The next morning, Saitō picks up Kenshin and Sanosuke and they leave for Shishio's base. Unknown to them, Hōji has sent most of the Juppongatana to attack the Aoi-Ya to prevent any further interference from the Oniwabanshū. Guided by Shishio's lover, Komagata Yumi, Kenshin and his friends find the first Juppongatana, the fallen monk Anji. Sanosuke is shocked to find Anji there and volunteers to fight him to learn if he is really evil. During the course of a brutal fight, Anji tells Sano his history and why he joined Shishio. He wants to save the world, but Sanosuke convinces him that his wish to destroy is not the way to achieve his goal. Although Sano is injured, he defeats Anji, who then warns them that the Aoi-Ya is under attack. Kenshin had asked Hiko to go there to protect Kaoru and the others, and he decides to trust his master to defend the Aoi-Ya. Kenshin then asks Yumi to guide them to the next fighter.
14	The Time is Now; Yakusoku no Toki wa Ima (約束の時は今)	March 4, 1997; 978-4-08-872284-9	May 14, 2005; 978-1-5911-6767-9
Act 112. "Onward" (前進, Zenshin); Act 113. "Usui's Shingan, Saitō's Shingan" (宇水の心眼 斎藤の心眼, Usui no Shingan, Saitō no Shingan); Act 114. "Fangs That Bite" (突きたてる牙, Tsukitateru Kiba); Act 115. "The Time is Now" (約束の時は今, Yakusoku no Toki wa Ima); Act 116. "To Battle, Again" (再戦開始, Saisen Kaishi); Act 117. "Aoshi Attacks" (蒼紫猛攻, Aoshi Mōkō); Act 118. "Paper-Thin" (紙一重, Kamihitoe); Act 119. "Time to Wake Up" (目醒める時は今, Mezameru Toki wa Ima); Act 120. "The Secret (Part I)" (天翔龍閃其之壱, Amakakeru Ryū no Hirameki Sono Ichi)
Kenshin and Sanosuke proceed through the maze with Yumi, leaving Saitō to fight "Blind Sword" Uonuma Usui, a formidable swordsman who lost his sight in a duel against Shishio. Although Usui claims that he wants to kill Shishio, Saitō realizes that he is actually afraid of facing Shishio again. His knowledge of Usui's real motive, the desire to save his pride, allows Saitō to overpower and kill him. Meanwhile, Kenshin finds Aoshi and remembers his promise to Misao to bring him back. He knows the only way to keep that promise is to fight Aoshi, and he challenges him. Kenshin defeats Aoshi using the Amakakeru Ryū no Hirameki, and Aoshi finally realizes that his deceased friends of the Oniwabanshū would not want him to have such a sad life.
15	The Great Man vs. The Giant; Kyojin tai Chōjin (巨人対超人)	May 1, 1997; 978-4-08-872295-5	June 3, 2005; 978-1-5911-6810-2
Act 121. "The Battle of Aoi-Ya" (攻防葵屋, Kōbō Aoiya); Act 122. "Put to the Test (Boy)" (闘う少年, Tatakau Shōnen); Act 123. "Put to the Test (Girl)" (闘う少女, Tatakau Shōjo); Act 124. "The Shadow of Despair" (絶望の影, Zetsubō no Kage); Act 125. "Descending!" (降臨!!, Kōrin!!); Act 126. "The Great Man vs. The Giant (Part I)" (巨人対超人(前編), Kyojin tai Chōjin (Zenpen)); Act 127. "The Great Man vs. The Giant (Part II)" (巨人対超人(後編), Kyojin tai Chōjin (Kōhen)); Act 128. "Sōjirō Strikes" (宗次郎出陣, Sōjirō Shutsujin); Act 129. "Shukuchi (Reduced Earth)" (縮地)
The Aoi-Ya is attacked by the Juppongatana. While Yahiko fights Kariwa Henya, Misao and Kaoru confront Honjō Kamatari, leaving the remaining Oniwabanshu to fight Iwanbō. Iwanbō escapes after the other Juppongatana are defeated but the last two members, Saizuchi and the giant Fuji, arrive. Hiko Seijūrō comes to the rescue and easily defeats Fuji. Saizuchi is helpless without Fuji, and the inn is saved. Meanwhile, Kenshin faces the strongest Juppongatana, Sōjirō, whose fighting skills include the shukuchi, which allows him to move too fast to be seen, and a lack of emotion that prevents Kenshin from predicting his movements.
16	Providence; Setsuri (摂理)	June 4, 1997; 978-4-08-872296-2	July 6, 2005; 978-1-5911-6854-6
Act 130. "Sōjirō's Story: Moonlight Encounter" (宗次郎の過去-月夜の邂逅-, Sōjirō no Kako -Tsukiyo no Kaikō-); Act 131. "Sōjirō's Story: Feast of Thunder" (宗次郎の過去-稲妻の狂宴-, Sōjirō no Kako -Inazuma no Kyōen-); Act 132. "Sōjirō's Story: Smile in the Frozen Rain" (宗次郎の過去-氷雨の笑顔-, Sōjirō no Kako -Hisame no Egao-); Act 133. "Destruction of the Soul" (精神(こころ)崩壊(こわれる), Kokoro Kowareru); Act 134. "The Second Secret" (天翔龍閃其之弐, Amakakeru Ryū no Hirameki Sono Ni); Act 135. "Those Who Gather, Those Who Part" (集う者去る者, Tsudou Mono Saru Mono); Act 136. "When Did the Battle Begin?" (闘いの始まりはいつからだったか, Tatakai no Hajimari wa itsu kara datta ka); Act 137. "Fuel" (糧, Kate); Act 138. "Providence" (摂理, Setsuri)
The fight against Kenshin causes Sōjirō to remember the day he met Shishio. He is overpowered by the memory of his family, who cruelly abused him. Shishio had given Sōjirō a sword, and when his family learned that he had been hiding Shishio, they tried to murder him. He killed them all and then left with Shishio. Sōjirō becomes furious after the pain of his memories resurface and recovers his emotions. Due to his emotional state, Kenshin is able to defeat him with the Amakakeru Ryū no Hirameki. Although he loses, Sōjirō discovers the secret of Kenshin's technique and tells Yumi, asking her to pass it on to Shishio. He then leaves the stronghold and Kenshin finally comes face to face with Shishio, who proves to be too strong for Kenshin. Kenshin is defeated, and Saitō bursts into the arena to attack Shishio, striking him in the head with his sword.
17	The Age Decides the Man; Ketchaku (決着)	October 3, 1997; 978-4-08-872297-9	August 3, 2005; 978-1-5911-6876-8
Act 139. "Howling Laugh" (高笑い, Takawarai); Act 140. "Thread of Life" (命運未だ尽きず, Meiun Imada Tsukizu); Act 141. "Double-Edged Flame" (両刃の炎, Moroha no Honoo); Act 142. "Final Encounter" (最終局面, Saishū Kyokumen); Act 143. "The Third Secret" (天翔龍閃其之参, Amakakeru Ryū no Hirameki Sono San); Act 144. "Shape of Love" (由美·愛の形, Yumi: Ai no Katachi); Act 145. "Duel of an Era" (決着-時代の選びし者-, Ketchaku -Jidai no Erabishimono-); Act 146. "The Passion of Hōji" (方治の執念, Hōji no Shūnen); Act 147. "Kyoto Epilogue: Fate of the Juppongatana (Part I)" (京都編エピローグ其之壱·十本刀始末(前編), Kyōto Hen Epirōgu Sono Ichi: Juppongatana Shimatsu (Zenpen)); Act 148. "Kyoto Epilogue: Fate of the Juppongatana (Part II)" (京都編エピローグ其之弐·十本刀始末(後編), Kyōto Hen Epirōgu Sono Ni: Juppongatana Shimatsu (Kōhen))
Saitō's attack fails, due to a metal headband that Shishio wears. He tells Saitō that before he was set on fire, he was shot in the head and he has the headband to avoid a similar injury. He defeats Saitō easily and Sanosuke attacks him with the Futae no Kiwami. Sano lands a solid hit on Shishio's jaw but his hand is shattered and Shishio defeats him. Aoshi then arrives to find Sanosuke, Saitō, and Kenshin unconscious. He battles Shishio, giving Kenshin time to recover. Kenshin's swordsman spirit also revives Sanosuke and Saitō and they watch as Kenshin fights one last time with Shishio, whose body temperature rises to a dangerous level. Yumi pleads with Kenshin to break off the fight and Shishio stabs through her into Kenshin. Kenshin is horrified at what he considers Shishio's betrayal of his lover, but Shishio retorts that he did what Yumi wanted him to do. She confirms this before dying in Shishio's arms, promising to wait for him. He continues the fight with Kenshin, but his body becomes so hot that it spontaneously combusts. Shocked by Shishio's death, Hōji destroys the base, but Sanosuke carries Kenshin to safety. Aoshi also escapes, as does Saitō, although his survival does not become known until later. One month later as Kenshin and his friends are recovering from their wounds, Chō visits them. He tells them that most of the Juppongatana have joined the Meiji Government, while Anji requested to be in prison, and Hōji committed suicide. Sōjirō and Iwanbō were never found.
18	Do You Still Bear the Scar? Jūji Kizu wa Mada Aru ka? (十字傷はまだ有るか?)	December 4, 1997; 978-4-08-872298-6	September 6, 2005; 978-1-5911-6959-8
Act 149. "Kyoto Epilogue: Early Summer Morning" (京都編エピローグ其之参·初夏の午前, Kyōto Hen Epirōgu Sono San: Shoka no Gozen); Act 150. "Kyoto Epilogue: Early Summer Day" (京都編エピローグ其之四·初夏の午後, Kyōto Hen Epirōgu Sono Yon: Shoka no Gogo); Act 151. "Kyoto Epilogue: In The Blue Sky" (京都編エピローグ其之五·In The Blue Sky, Kyōto Hen Epirōgu Sono Go: In Za Burū Sukai); Act 152. "Cross-Shaped Scar" (十字傷はまだ有るか?, Jūji Kizu wa Mada Aru ka?); Act 153. "The One-Handed Man" (隻腕の男, Sekiwan no Otoko); Act 154. "The Signal Fire of Revenge" (復讐の狼煙, Fukushū no Noroshi); Act 155. "Jinchū" (人誅); Act 156. "Comrades" (同志, Dōshi); Act 157. "Yahiko's Desperation" (弥彦のあせり, Yahiko no Aseri); Act 158. "Twin Storms Blow!" (双嵐吹き荒ぶ!, Sōran Fukisusabu!)
Kenshin and his friends return to Tokyo and plan a celebration at the Akabeko. When Kenshin arrives, he sees Kujiranami Hyōgo, a man he defeated during the Bakumatsu. After dinner Kenshin confides to Sanosuke that he is worried and while Sano is attempting to reassure him, the Akobeko is attacked and destroyed. They learn that a group known as the Six Comrades are attacking Kenshin's friends. Kenshin and Sanosuke start guarding several places which Kenshin commonly visits. One night two members from the Six Comrades, Inui Banjin and Otowa Hyōko, attack a dojo Kenshin visited with Kaoru and Chief Uramura's house. Kenshin and Sanosuke head out to fight the two members.
19	Shades of Reality; Maboroshi to Genjitsu (幻と現実)	February 4, 1998; 978-4-08-872515-4	October 10, 2005; 978-1-5911-6927-7
Act 159. "The Invulnerable Gauntlets" (無敵鉄甲, Mutekitekkō); Act 160. "Instrument of Shadows" (人間暗器, Ningen Anki); Act 161. "Hard Questioning" (穿つ問い掛け, Ugatsu Toikake); Act 162. "Dawn Thoughts" (暁に想う, Akatsuki ni Omou); Act 163. "Drawing to a Close" (終焉への序曲, Shūen e no Jokyoku); Act 164. "Shades of Reality" (幻と現実, Maboroshi to Genjitsu); Act 165. "Remembrance 1: Hitokiri" (追憶ノ壱-人斬り-, Tsuioku no Ichi -Hitokiri-); Act 166. "Remembrance 2: The Birth of Battōsai" (追憶ノ弐-抜刀斎誕生-, Tsuioku no Ni -Battōsai Tanjō-); Act 167. "Remembrance 3: In the Rain of Blood" (追憶ノ参-血の雨の男と女-, Tsuioku no San -Chi no Ame no Otoko to Onna-)
Sanosuke faces Banjin, but is unable to defeat him since his right hand is still injured due to his fights in Kyoto. However, Banjin escapes as his partner Gein shoots a bomb to the area. While Kenshin fights Otowa, Kujiranami shoots Kenshin with an Armstrong cannon as Otowa escapes noting Kenshin's strength. While Kenshin returns to the Kamiya dojo, he is confronted by the leader from the group, Yukishiro Enishi, who tells him that his group will attack the Kamiya dojo in a few days. Kenshin returns to the Kamiya dojo, and explains to his friends that Enishi seeks revenge for the death of his sister and also Kenshin's wife, Yukishiro Tomoe, who was killed by Kenshin fifteen years ago. A flashback from Kenshin then starts showing how he became hitokiri as well as how he killed his lover Tomoe.
20	Remembrance; Tsuioku (追憶)	May 4, 1998; 978-4-08-872551-2	November 1, 2005; 978-1-4215-0064-5
Act 168. "Remembrance 4: Yukishiro Tomoe" (追憶ノ四-雪代 巴-, Tsuioku no Shi -Yukishiro Tomoe-); Act 169. "Remembrance 5: Madness" (追憶ノ伍-狂-, Tsuioku no Go -Kyō-); Act 170. "Remembrance 6: Chaos: Genji" (追憶ノ六-激動·元治元年-, Tsuioku no Roku -Gekidō: Genji Gannen-); Act 171. "Brief Intermission" (小休止, Shōkyūshi); Act 172. "Remembrance 7: By the Farmlands" (追憶ノ七-田園にて-, Tsuioku no Nana -Den'en ni te-); Act 173. "Remembrance 8: Arrival of Enishi" (追憶ノ八-縁、来訪-, Tsuioku no Hachi -Enishi, Raihō-); Act 174. "Remembrance 9: White Snow" (追憶ノ九-雪、白く…-, Tsuioku no Kyū -Yuki, Shiroku...-); Act 175. "Remembrance 10: The Binding Forest" (追憶ノ十-結界の森-, Tsuioku no Jū -Kekkai no Mori-); Act 176. "Remembrance 11: Shadow Warriors" (追憶ノ十一-闇乃武-, Tsuioku no Jūichi -Yami no Bu-); Act 177. "Remembrance 12: Fierce Battle" (追憶ノ十二-激闘-, Tsuioku no Jūni -Gekitō-)
Kenshin's flashback continues showing how he met Tomoe, and both started a romantic relationship. After an incident from the Ishin Shishi, Kenshin and Tomoe get married, and move to live to a little town under advice from Kenshin's superiors. During those days, Kenshin becomes happier and calmer, but it is later revealed that Tomoe was sent by a group of assassins known as the Yaminobu to discover his weakpoints. When Tomoe goes to her group's base, but lies to them as she is in love with Kenshin. However, the group realize this and kidnap Tomoe to make Kenshin try to rescue her. Kenshin manages to defeat the assassins and meet their boss, but is severely injured during the fights.
21	And So, Time Passed; Soshite Jidai wa Nagare (そして時代は流れ)	July 3, 1998; 978-4-08-872574-1	December 6, 2005; 978-1-4215-0082-9
Act 178. "Remembrance 13: Cross-shaped Scar" (追憶ノ十三-十字傷-, Tsuioku no Jūsan -Jūji Kizu-); Act 179. "Remembrance 14: And So, Time Passed" (追憶ノ十四-そして時代は流れ-, Tsuioku no Jūshi -Soshite Jidai wa Nagare-); Act 180. "Night Fell..." (夜が更けて…, Yo ga Fukete...); Act 181. "A Strand of Hope" (一縷の望み, Ichiru no Nozomi); Act 182. "Confession (Part 1)" (告白(前編), Kokuhaku (Zenpen)); Act 183. "Confession (Part 2)" (告白(後編), Kokuhaku (Kōhen)); Act 184. "Fireworks" (花火, Hanabi); Act 185. "Vs. the Armstrong Cannon" (対(たい)アームストロング砲(カノン), Tai Āmusuturongu Kanon); Act 186. "Neo-Invulnerable Gauntlets" (新·無敵鉄甲, Shin Mutekitekkō)
Kenshin faces the boss from the assassins, but is unable to defeat him. Kenshin desesperately attacks the boss, but although he kills him, Tomoe dies while protecting Kenshin. Some weeks later, Kenshin returns to be a hitokiri until the Bakumatsu ends. After Kenshin's flashback ends, all his friends prepare to fight against Enishi. During those days, Kaoru also requests Misao to bring Tomoe's diary to Tokyo to make Enishi read it and she sets out with Aoshi. When the Six Comrades invade Kamiya dojo, Kujiranami is the first to attack, wanting to take revenge for his defeat he had against Kenshin. Kenshin and Sanosuke manage to defeat him, but they are then attacked by Banjin and Otowa. As Banjin once again surpasses Sanosuke, Gein prepares to attack the dojo.
22	Battle on Three Fronts; Sankyoku no Tatakai (三局の戦い)	September 3, 1998; 978-4-08-872601-4	January 3, 2006; 978-1-4215-0196-3
Act 187. "The Tides of Battle" (戦局の行方, Senkyoku no Yukue); Act 188. "Artist of Karakuri" (機巧(からくり)の芸術家(あるてぃすと), Karakuri no Arutisuto); Act 189. "Battle on Three Fronts: Round 1, Part 1" (三局の闘い其之一ノ一, Sankyoku no Tatakai Sono Ichi no Ichi); Act 190. "Battle on Three Fronts: Round 1, Part 2" (三局の闘い其之一ノ二, Sankyoku no Tatakai Sono Ichi no Ni); Act 191. "Battle on Three Fronts: Round 2, Part 1" (三局の闘い其之二ノ一, Sankyoku no Tatakai Sono Ni no Ichi); Act 192. "Battle on Three Fronts: Round 2, Part 2" (三局の闘い其之二ノ二, Sankyoku no Tatakai Sono Ni no Ni); Act 193. "Battle on Three Fronts: Round 2, Part 3" (三局の闘い其之二ノ三, Sankyoku no Tatakai Sono Ni no San); Act 194. "Battle on Three Fronts: Round 3, Part 1" (三局の闘い其之三ノ一, Sankyoku no Tatakai Sono San no Ichi); Act 195. "Battle on Three Fronts: Round 3, Part 2" (三局の闘い其之三ノ二, Sankyoku no Tatakai Sono San no Ni); Act 196. "Smoke of the Wolf" (狼の紫煙, Ōkami no Shien)
Gein attacks the Kamiya dojo with his most powerful Iwanbō mechanic puppet and Kenshin goes to fight against him, leaving Yahiko to fight against Otowa in his place. After a prolonged fight, Kenshin destroys Iwanbō, and rests for a while for his next fight. Sanosuke continues fighting Banjin, and defeats him using his Futae no Kiwami even though his right hand is severely wounded. After evading all of Otowa's weapons Yahiko manages to use the strongest techniques from the Kamiya Kasshin-ryū, and wins the fight. While Megumi heals Yahiko, the group is then suddenly attacked by Yatsume Mumyōi, who was one of the assassins that sent Tomoe fifteen years ago to investigate Kenshin and was defeated by Kenshin went to rescue Tomoe.
23	Sin, Judgement, Acceptance; Tsumi to Batsu no Ishiki (罪と罰の意識)	November 4, 1998; 978-4-08-872626-7	February 14, 2006; 978-1-4215-0276-2
Act 197. "The Wolf Returns" (再びの狼, Futatabi no Ōkami); Act 198. "I Can't See Him Losing" (負ける気がしねぇ, Makeru Ki ga Shinē); Act 199. "Inadequate Strategy" (甘い采配, Amai Saihai); Act 200. "The Destined Duel" (宿命の私闘, Shukumei no Shitō); Act 201. "Another Strength" (もう一つの力, Mō Hitotsu no Chikara); Act 202. "Tales of the Past" (昔語り, Mukashigatari); Act 203. "A Pure and Simple End to a 15-Year Duel" (この十五年に及ぶ私闘に純然たる決着を, Kono Jūgonen ni Oyobu Shitō ni Junzentaru Ketchaku o); Act 204. "Sin, Judgement, Acceptance" (罪と罰の意識, Tsumi to Batsu no Ishiki); Act 205. "The True Intent of the Jinchū" (人誅真意, Jinchū Shin'i); Act 206. "The Clouded Darkness" (鈍色暗中, Nibiiro Anchū)
Saitō goes to the Kamiya dojo to arrest Enishi, who has an organization that sells weapons. With Yatsume blocking him, Saitō confronts him. He easily defeats him, leaving Enishi as the only left warrior. Therefore, Enishi prepares to fight Kenshin. Using a powerful Chinese swordsmanship style, Enishi manages to fight at the same level of Kenshin. They then proceed to use their strongest technique, and Enishi succeeds in breaking the Amakakeru Ryū no Hirameki. After Kenshin is knocked out, Enishi reveals his intention to kill Kaoru to cause more pain to Kenshin. Kenshin then stands up and furiously attack Enishi. Before Enishi is defeated, Kujiranami ambushes Kenshin, allowing Enishi to find Kaoru.
24	The End of Dreams; Yume no Owari (ユメノオワリ)	February 4, 1999; 978-4-08-872668-7	March 7, 2006; 978-1-4215-0338-7
Act 207. "Plunge into Darkness" (暗転入滅, Anten Nyūmetsu); Act 208. "The End of Dreams" (ユメノオワリ, Yume no Owari); Act 209. "See Ya" (あばよ, Aba yo); Act 210. "Geezer — Identity Unknown" (オイボレ-その男素性不明-, Oibore -Sono Otoko Sujō Fumei-); Act 211. "It's Not Impossible" (零(ゼロ)じゃあない, Zero jaa nai); Act 212. "Begin Acting" (行動開始, Kōdō Kaishi); Act 213. "Exchange Offer" (交換条件, Kōkan Jōken); Act 214. "Change in Enishi" (縁変調, Enishi Henchō); Act 215. "Three Days Later" (三日経過, Mikka Keika); Act 216."The Two in Black (Part 1)" (黒い装束の二人(前編), Kuroi Shōzoku no Futari (Zenpen)); Act 217. "The Two in Black (Part 2)" (黒い装束の二人(後編), Kuroi Shōzoku no Futari (Kōhen))
Saitō and Sanosuke defeat Kujiranami, but when Kenshin returns to the dojo he finds Kaoru dead. Two weeks later, Kenshin is found in the Fallen Village of outcasts, unwilling to move from there. This causes Sanosuke to leave Tokyo, disappointed by his acting. Misao and Aoshi arrive to Tokyo, and are told what happened. As Aoshi investigates, he asks help from Yahiko to open Kaoru's grave. There they discover that the deceased Kaoru is a puppet created by Gein, and the real one was kidnapped by Enishi. Enishi tries to kill Kaoru, but he is unable to do it as it reminds him of Tomoe's death. Gein soon tries to recover the puppet, but he is stopped by Aoshi. Gein is killed by Aoshi, who manages to make Gein tell him Enishi's location before he dies.
25	The Truth; Shinjitsu (真実)	April 2, 1999; 978-4-08-872696-0	April 4, 2006; 978-1-4215-0407-0
Act 218. "Madness Released" (狂気 解き放たる, Kyōki Tokihanataru); Act 219. "Yahiko's True Battle (Part 1)" (弥彦 真の闘い 其の壱, Yahiko, Shin no Tatakai Sono Ichi); Act 220. "Yahiko's True Battle (Part 2)" (弥彦 真の闘い 其の弐, Yahiko, Shin no Tatakai Sono Ni); Act 221. "Yahiko's True Battle (Part 3)" (弥彦 真の闘い 其の参, Yahiko, Shin no Tatakai Sono San); Act 222. "Yahiko's True Battle (Part 4)" (弥彦 真の闘い 其の四, Yahiko, Shin no Tatakai Sono Shi); Act 223. "Dream, Reality and Illusions" (夢と現と幻, Yume to Utsutsu to Maboroshi); Act 224. "The Truth" (真実, Shinjitsu); Act 225. "That Moment, a Gust of Wind" (その時、一陣の風, Sono Toki, Ichijin no Kaze); Act 226. "From a Samurai to the Shizoku" (侍から士族へ, Samurai kara Shizoku e); Act 227. "Four More Days, One More Person" (あと四日、あと一人, Ato Yokka, Ato Hitori)
Kujiranami loses his control in prison, and goes berserk, attacking all Tokyo. With Saitō and Aoshi being investigating Enishi's island, Yahiko and a few policemen are the only ones try to confront him. All the officers are defeated by Kujiranami while Yahiko continues facing him despite his critical injuries. Tsubame desperately asks Kenshin to help, but he still does not react. Another wanderer nicknamed Geezer, later revealed as Tomoe's father, helps Kenshin to discover what he can do to pay for the murderers he committed. Kenshin then goes to fight Kujiranami, and manages to calm him. After Kujiranami allows the policemen to arrest him, Kenshin starts resting to heal his wounds in order to prepare to rescue Kaoru.
26	A Man's Back; Otoko no Senaka (男の背中)	July 2, 1999; 978-4-08-872732-5	May 2, 2006; 978-1-4215-0673-9
Act 228. "A Man's Back 1: Fight Merchant Reestablished" (男の背中 其之壱 喧嘩屋再開, Otoko no Senaka Sono Ichi: Kenka-ya Saikai); Act 229. "A Man's Back 2: Two Alike" (男の背中 其之弐 似た者同士, Otoko no Senaka Sono Ni: Nitamonodōshi); Act 230. "A Man's Back 3: Portrait of a Family" (男の背中 其之参 家族の肖像, Otoko no Senaka So no San: Kazoku no Shōzō); Act 231. "A Man's Back 4: Explosion" (男の背中 其之四 一触即発, Otoko no Senaka Sono Shi: Isshokusokuhatsu); Act 232. "A Man's Back 5: Character of Evil" (男の背中 其之伍 悪一文字, Otoko no Senaka Sono Go: Aku Ichimonji); Act 233. "A Man's Back 6: Cry of the Mountain" (男の背中 其之六 山鳴り, Otoko no Senaka Sono Roku: Yamanari); Act 234. "A Man's Back 7: The Back Tells Tales" (男の背中 其之七 背中は語る, Otoko no Senaka Sono Nana: Senaka wa Kataru); Act 235. "White as the Snow Seen That Day" (あの日見た、雪の白さ, Ano Hi Mita, Yuki no Shirosa); Act 236. "Landing" (上陸, Jōriku); Act 237. "Quarrel" (仲違い, Nakatagai)
Sanosuke finds the village where he was born and is hired by a local yakuza, Fudōsawa, to beat up a villager who was opposing him. Sanosuke finds that this villager is in fact his father, Higashidani Kamishimoemon, who is living along with his two children who do not know that Sanosuke is their brother. While discussing with his father, Sanosuke finds that the village is being tortured by Fudōsawa, who is supported by Tani Jūsanrō. After defeating Fudōsawa and all of his soldiers and beating up Tani, Sanosuke returns to Tokyo. Once he is healed, Kenshin and his friends go to Enishi's island to save Kaoru. However, as they arrive to the island, the group is attacked by Enishi's partner, Woo Heishin.
27	The Answer; Kotae (答)	September 3, 1999; 978-4-08-872758-5	June 6, 2006; 978-1-4215-0674-6
Act 238. "Sū-shin Transformation" (四(スー)星(シン)変(へん)化(げ), Sūshin Henge); Act 239. "Sū-shin Battle — Saitō vs. Seiryū" (四(スー)神(シン)対(たい)決(けつ)-斎(さい)藤(とう)対(たい)青(せい)龍(りゅう)-, Sūshin Taiketsu -Saitō tai Seiryū-); Act 240. "Sū-shin Battle — Aoshi vs. Suzaku" (四(スー)神(シン)対(たい)決(けつ)-蒼(あお)紫(し)対(たい)朱(す)雀(ざく)-, Sūshin Taiketsu -Aoshi tai Suzaku-); Act 241. "Sū-shin Battle — Sanosuke vs. Byakko" (四(スー)神(シン)対(たい)決(けつ)-左(さ)之(の)助(すけ)対(たい)白(びゃっ)虎(こ)-, Sūshin Taiketsu -Sanosuke tai Byakko-); Act 242. "Sū-shin Battle — Yahiko vs. Genbu" (四(スー)神(シン)対(たい)決(けつ)-弥(や)彦(ひこ)対(たい)玄(げん)武(ぶ)-, Sūshin Taiketsu -Yahiko tai Genbu-); Act 243. "The Dragon and the Tiger Meet Again" (龍虎再見, Ryūko Saiken); Act 244. "Sword Strikes" (撃剣, Gekiken); Act 245. "Hiten Mitsurugi-ryū Defeated" (飛天御剣流、封殺, Hiten Mitsurugi-ryū, Fūsatsu); Act 246. "The Answer" (答, Kotae); Act 247. "Kyōkeimyaku (Frenzied Nerves)" (狂経脈)
Saitō, Aoshi, Sanosuke and Yahiko fight and defeat Heishin's four bodyguards, the Sū-shin, so that Kenshin can rest before fighting Enishi. Heishin tries to escape, but he is suddenly knocked out by Enishi. Having already brought Kaoru with him, Enishi starts fighting Kenshin and manages to block all his techniques. Enishi tells Kenshin to commit suicide, but Kenshin negates, saying that the answer he found pay to for his murderers is by continuing protecting the weak. Enraged, Enishi suddenly awakens a mysterious ability named Kyōkeimyaku, a product of his trauma of witnessing Tomoe's death. In this state, Enishi's senses are intensified, allowing him to severely injure Kenshin.
28	Toward a New Era; Aratanaru Sedai e (新たなる世代へ)	November 4, 1999; 978-4-08-872782-0	July 5, 2006; 978-1-4215-0675-3
Act 248. "Fury" (怒り, Ikari); Act 249. "A New Step" (新たなる一歩, Aratanaru Ippo); Act 250. "Smile Once More" (笑顔、再び, Egao, Futatabi); Act 251. "Hurry Go Round"; Act 252. "Autumn Wind" (秋風, Akikaze); Act 253. "Early Spring Sunshine" (小春日和, Koharubiyori); Act 254. "Years" (星霜, Seisō); Act 255 "(Finale) "Toward a New Era" ((終幕)新たなる世代へ, (Shūmaku). "Aratanaru Sedai e); Final Volume Short Story 2: "Meteor Strike" (メテオ ストライク, Meteo Sutoraiku); "Buso Renkin Special Manga Preview" (US edition only)
Using his sakabatō, Kenshin creates a sonic wave that injures Enishi's intensified senses. Both of them then proceed to use their strongest moves, and Kenshin wins as he is now able to use all his force. Heishin tries to shoot all of them, but Enishi knocks him out, as he remembers Tomoe's death. The police arrest Enishi, but he escapes when Kaoru gives him Tomoe's diary. Back in Tokyo, seeing that Kenshin will never be a hitokiri again, Saitō decides not to have his final fight against him. Megumi goes to Aizu to open her own clinic, while Sanosuke starts traveling around the world as he is now on the run from the police for having attacked Tani Jūsanrō, a former Ishin Shishi. Five years later, Kenshin has married Kaoru, and they have a son named Himura Kenji. When Yahiko visits them, Kenshin challenges Yahiko to a fight to see how much he has improved. Although Yahiko loses, Kenshin gives him his sakabatō, being satisfied with his development.
