= SPEC: Close =

- Blu-ray cover
- Directed by: Yukihiko Tsutsumi
- Screenplay by: Yumie Nishiogi
- Produced by: Hiroki Ueda; Natsuki Imai
- Starring: Erika Toda; Ryo Kase; Kazuki Kitamura; Chiaki Kuriyama; Osamu Mukai
- Cinematography: Shigetomo Madarame
- Edited by: Nobuyuki Itō
- Music by: Keiichirō Shibuya; Gabriele Roberto
- Distributed by: Toei
- Release date: November 1, 2013 (Japan)
- Running time: 93 minutes (Zen no Hen); 91 minutes (Kou no Hen)
- Country: Japan
- Language: Japanese
- Box office: ¥2.23 billion (US$22 million)

SPEC: Close (Japanese: 劇場版 ＳＰＥＣ～結～) is a 2013 Japanese film directed by Yukihiko Tsutsumi. The first part, Zen no Hen (Japanese: 漸ノ篇; lit. Incarnation), was released on 1 November, and the second part, Kou no Hen (Japanese: 爻ノ篇; lit. Reincarnation), was released on 29 November. This film is a sequel to the 2012 film SPEC: Ten, and the last of the SPEC series.

== Cast ==
- Erika Toda as Saya Tōma
- Ryo Kase as Takeru Sebumi
- Kazuki Kitamura as Shū Kikkawa
- Chiaki Kuriyama as Satoko Aoike
- Osamu Mukai as Sekai
- Yuu Kashii as Jōkai Jōkyokusai
- Kasumi Arimura as Miyabi Masaki
- Kenichi Endō as T. Hideki
- Yuko Asano as Madam Yang/Madam Yin
- Ryūnosuke Kamiki as Jūichi Ninomae
- Saki Fukuda as Mirei Shimura
- Yū Shirota as Satoshi Chii
- Yuko Oshima as a mysterious woman

== Reception ==
Almost a month after being released, the film had grossed ¥2.23 billion (US$22 million).
