= Saki Fukuda =

Japanese actress and singer (born 1990)

- Born: September 19, 1990 (age 35); Kumamoto, Kumamoto, Japan
- Years active: 2004 – present
- Spouse: Yuki Tokito (m. 2026)

Saki Fukuda (福田 沙紀, Fukuda Saki; born on September 19, 1990, in Kumamoto, Kumamoto) is a Japanese actress and singer.

She appeared in the 2009 live action film Yatterman as Yatterman 2 "Ai-chan."

== Personal life ==
On August 28, 2026, she announced her marriage with actor Yuki Tokito.

== Filmography ==
=== Film ===
Year	Title	Role	Notes	Ref.
2008	The Cherry Orchard: Blossoming	Momo Yūki	Lead role	
2009	Yatterman	Ai-chan		
2012	SPEC: Ten	Mirei Shimura		
2013	SPEC: Close – Incarnation	Mirei Shimura		
2013	SPEC: Close – Reincarnation	Mirei Shimura		
2021	Ninja Girl	Miu Karasuma	Lead role	
2025	Kumamoto no Kareshi	Kaori Kawashima		

=== Television ===
Year	Title	Role	Notes	Ref.
2007	Life	Manami Anzai		
2012	Taira no Kiyomori	Yaehime	Taiga drama	

== Awards and nominations ==
Year	Award	Category	Work(s)	Result	Ref.
2009	32nd Japan Academy Film Prize	Newcomer of the Year	The Cherry Orchard: Blossoming	Won	
