= Ninja Girl (film) =

- Theatrical release poster
- Directed by: Yu Irie
- Written by: Yu Irie
- Produced by: Yu Irie
- Starring: Saki Fukuda; Mutsuo Yoshioka; Neya Ryoka; Shohei Uno; Mayumi Kanetani; Hiroaki Matsuzawa; Koji Mitzumizo; Jo Kirian; Yu Yasuda; Arata Yamanaka; Takuro Kodama; Shin'ichi Shirahata; Junpei Hashino; Arata Iura
- Cinematography: Motomu Ishigaki
- Edited by: Yu Irie
- Music by: Shogo Kaida
- Production company: cognitoworks
- Distributed by: cognitoworks
- Release date: 21 August 2021 (Japan)
- Running time: 88 minutes
- Country: Japan
- Language: Japanese

Ninja Girl (Japanese: シュシュシュの娘) is a 2021 Japanese comedy-drama film directed by Yu Irie, starring Saki Fukuda. A political satire, it follows a young woman who learns that she is descended from a long line of ninjas and stands up against the xenophobic and corrupt local government.

== Cast ==
- Saki Fukuda as Miu Komaru
- Mutsuo Yoshioka as Hiroshi Tsukasa
- Neya Ryoka as Saeko Tanji
- Shohei Uno as Goro Komaru
- Mayumi Kanetani as Hitomi Muteda
- Hiroaki Matsuzawa as Nobuhisa Sagawa
- Koji Mitzumizo as Sosuke Koike
- Jo Kirian as Miyoshi Takamine
- Yu Yasuda as Da Nang
- Arata Yamanaka as Hirofumi Yoshikawa
- Takuro Kodama Shigeru Ishihara
- Shin'ichi Shirahata as Minetarou Senda
- Junpei Hashino as Hajime Baba
- Arata Iura as Koji Mano

== Production ==
Yu Irie revealed at a press conference on 4 July 2020 that he would be directing Ninja Girl, his first independent film since Roadside Fugitive in 2012. He stated he had decided to start on this project as a period epic film, which he had been working on for several years, was delayed due to the COVID-19 pandemic. He also claimed that he wished to direct more while he was still physically able and that he aimed to support mini theatres, which had suffered temporary closures, reduced seating capacity and declining patronage due to the pandemic. Auditions had already begun the month before, with over 2,500 actors applying, largely due to the lack of opportunities during the pandemic. Pre-production was set to begin that month while principal photography was to take place in fall. On 28 July, Irie initiated a crowdfunding campaign for the film. By 12 August, he had raised ¥11,920,000.

In writing the script, Irie chose to introduce a plot point involving an "Immigration Elimination Ordinance" which the government is attempting to pass. He claimed to have done so as he was "concerned" with the increasing sentiment of intolerance in Japan, particularly towards immigrants and refugees, considering the difficulty of attaining refugee status in the country a "great disgrace". Due to the independent nature of the production, he was able to explore various controversial topics in the film. He did not make any significant alterations to the script after completing the first draft. He cast Saki Fukuda as the lead for her dancing abilities and her "piercing" eyes. This was Fukuda's first appearance in an independent film. Fukura, who had just left her agency and become a freelancer, auditioned for the role as she wanted to know if she could "make it" as an actress Prominent actor Arata Iura, who had founded an initiative to support mini theaters, was cast in a supporting role after personally approaching Irie on Twitter. The film's cast was publicly announced at an event livestreamed on the BroccoRecord YouTube channel on 24 September.

The film was shot on location in the city of Fukaya, Saitama, Irie's hometown, which is parodied in the film as "Fukuya". Filming began at the end of September and wrapped up on 22 October. It involved student volunteers who had lost their part-time jobs or were unable to attend classes due to the pandemic. This also included several young actors who had failed the auditions but still wished to participate in the making of the film. As such, with many volunteers lacking experience, Irie chose not to adhere to a "professional" schedule He encouraged the staff to "take as many breaks as possible." They would occasionally have to take breaks of around two hours such that some staff members could attend their remote classes. Irie shot the film with a 1:33:1 aspect ratio with mini theatres in mind. While filming, Fukuda actively made suggestions towards her character's appearance, attire and posture in addition to doing her own choreography.

== Release ==
The film had a premiere screening at the Eurospace arthouse cinema in Shibuya which was broadcast live to 23 mini theatres across the country on 11 August 2021. It officially opened in theatres in Japan on 21 August. All of the funds collected through the screening's admission fee were donated to the theatres. The film's publicity team was composed of actors and production staff who had volunteered. The film also screened at the SVA Theater in New York City on 15 August as part of the 2021 New York Asian Film Festival. It was announced in November that the film would screen for one week at the K's cinema in Tokyo from 4 December on the theatre's reopening. The film was reportedly still playing in arthouse theatres across the country then.

== Reception ==
David Ehrlich of IndieWire opined that while the film "seems primed for breakout potential", it "never betrays its local concerns", calling it the "kind of low-budget, legitimately independent fare that may never be given another foothold on the world stage." Lee Jutton of Film Inquiry called it an "absolutely remarkable movie that will entertain and inspire in equal measure", lauding the "super enjoyable and believable courtesy" of Fukada's performance, the "compelling" cinematography and the "bright" and "bouncy" score. Cecilia Barroso of Cenas de Cinema rated the film 3.5 stars out of 5, calling Miu's character arc "unique" and praising the central message, which "resonates powerfully."

Rapper and critic Utamaru, in his weekly film review segment on TBS Radio, considered the film a "one-of-a-kind" which could only have been made by Irie at that moment in Japan. Utamaru praised the cinematography, the characterisation and Fukuda's performance. He further lauded the depiction of the local authorities and the general public's perception of them. Utamaru also commented on the film's "mismatched" score. However, he also noted that the film's dialogue was rather faint at times, particularly towards the beginning. Megumi of Radio Nikkei called the film "fun", "refreshing" and "entertaining" despite the heavy subject matter. She compared it to the films of Quentin Tarantino and opined that it remained "cohesive" despite its "roughness". She also praised the "memorable" score, noting that "in a good way", it did not "match" the visuals.

Junichi Inoue and Shigeki Koga of Kinema Junpo both gave the film a 3/5 rating. Inoue criticised the screenplay for being unrealistic in places, while Koga instead called the film "strangely real". However, Marie Kono, also of Kinema Junpo, was far more critical, giving it a 2/5 rating. She criticised the premise, finding it juvenile, and felt that the final showdown was anticlimactic. Kono also called Iura a "complete waste of money."
