= Yūko Asano =

Japanese actress and singer (born 1960)

- Born: July 9, 1960 (age 66); Kobe, Japan
- Occupations: Actress, singer
- Years active: 1972–present
- Height: 1.67 m (5 ft 5 1/2 in)

Yūko Asano (浅野 ゆう子, Asano Yūko; born 9 July 1960) is a Japanese actress and singer. She won the award for best actress at the 19th Japan Academy Prize for Kura. She was born in Kobe.

Her biggest hit was "Sexy Bus Stop" released in 1976. It reached the No. 12 position on the Oricon chart list.

== Filmography ==
=== Films ===
- The Devil's Island (1977)
- The War in Space (1977)
- Sorobanzuku (1986)
- Ruten no umi (1990)
- Bloom in the Moonlight (1993)
- Kura (1995)
- Dora-heita (2000)
- Oh! Oku (2006)
- SPEC: Ten (2012)
- SPEC: Close (2013)
- Mystery Arena (2026)

=== Television ===
- Momotarō-zamurai (1981)
- Shounen wa Tori ni Natta (2001)
- Kōmyō ga Tsuji (2006) as Nene
- Totto-chan! (2017) as Sadako Sawamura
