= Kura (film) =

- DVD cover
- Directed by: Yasuo Furuhata
- Screenplay by: Kōji Takada
- Produced by: Masato Kameoka; Keita Senoo; Chisuke Kawano; Gorō Kusakabe; Hiroki Matsukata
- Starring: Yūko Asano; Sae Isshiki; Yui Natsukawa; Hitomi Kuroki; Hiroki Matsukata
- Cinematography: Fujio Morita
- Edited by: Eifu Tamaki
- Music by: Takayuki Hattori; Masashi Sada
- Release date: October 10, 1995 (Japan)
- Running time: 130 minutes
- Country: Japan
- Language: Japanese

Kura (Japanese: 藏) is a 1995 Japanese drama film directed by Yasuo Furuhata.

== Cast ==
- Yūko Asano as Saho Sano
- Sae Isshiki as Retsu Tanouchi
- Yui Natsukawa as Seki Yamanaka
- Hitomi Kuroki as Kaho Tanouchi
- Hiroki Matsukata as Izou Tanouchi
- Hidetoshi Nishijima as Ryota Takeda
- Eiichiro Funakoshi as Takero Sano
- Jun Etoh
- Shigemitsu Ogi as Yasuke
- Naomi Kawashima
- Tetsuo Ishidate as Oracle
- Hatsunori Hasegawa as Masahiro Tanouchi
- Shigeru Kōyama
- Keizō Kanie as Shin Hirayama
- Yukiji Asaoka as Masae Tanimura
- Haruko Kato as Mura Tanouchi
- Masaki Nishina

== Awards ==
19th Japan Academy Prize

- Best Actress - Yūko Asano
- Newcomer of the Year - Sae Isshiki
