= Shounen wa Tori ni Natta =

- Starring: Tomohisa Yamashita; Shunsuke Kazama; Risa Nishimura; Yūko Asano
- Country of origin: Japan
- Original language: Japanese
- No. of episodes: 1

Original release
- Network: TBS
- Release: April 2001

Shounen wa Tori ni Natta (Japanese: 少年は鳥になった) is a 2001 Japanese television film by TBS.

== Cast ==
- Tomohisa Yamashita as Ken Nagashima
- Shunsuke Kazama as Koiichi
- Risa Nishimura as Kira Mizusawa
- Yūko Asano as Naoko Nagashima
- Masato Furuoya as Mr. Nagashima
- Masahiko Tsugawa as Dr. Watanuki
- Saki Takaoka as Teacher Miyada
- Erina Asai as Hikari Nagashima
- Kusami Nakane as Jun Nagashima
- Junnosuke Taguchi
