= Arata Iura =

Japanese actor, model and fashion designer

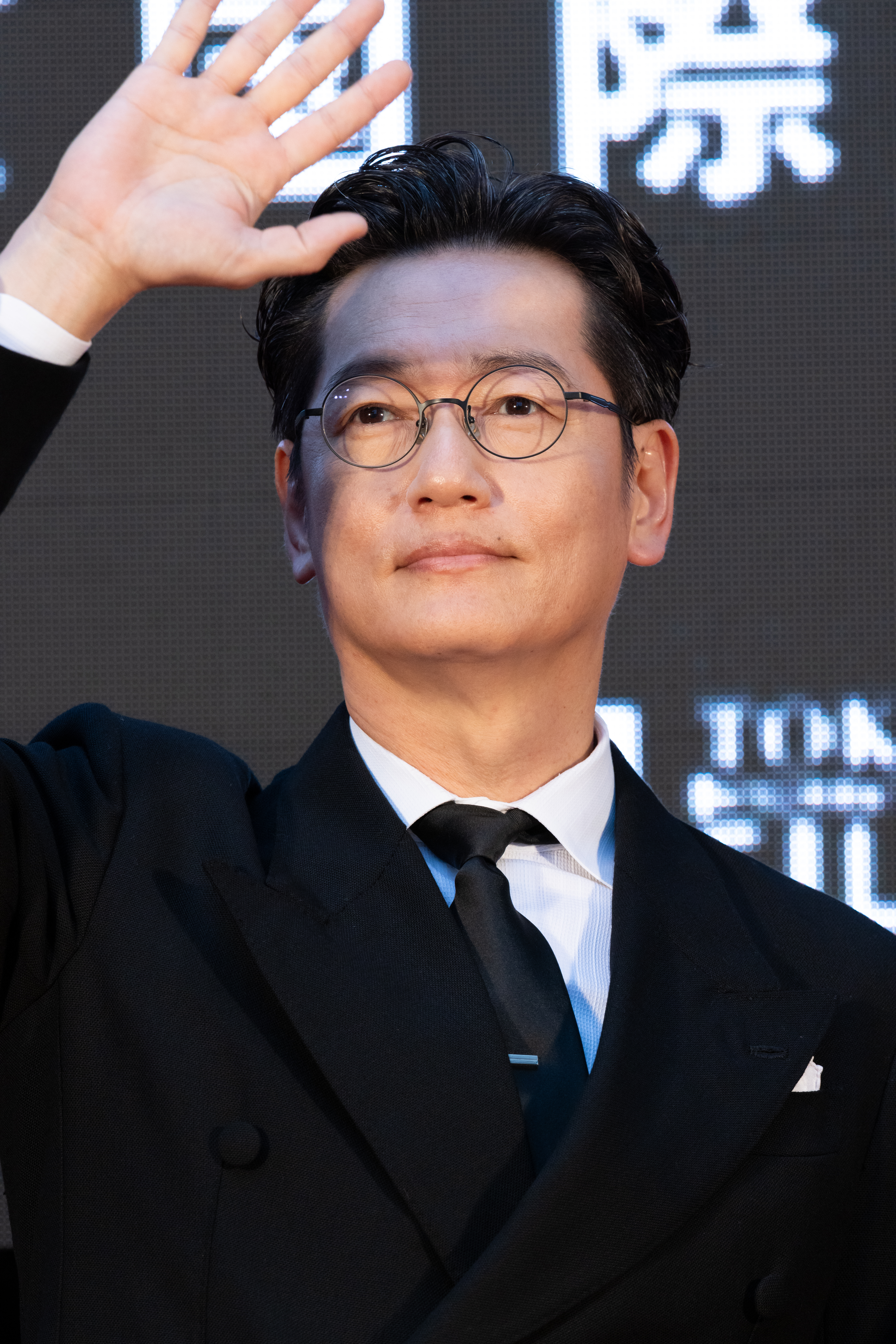
- Iura attending the 37th Tokyo International Film Festival 2024
- Born: Tokyo, Japan
- Other name: Arata
- Occupation: Actor
- Years active: 1998–present
- Spouse: Married

Arata Iura (井浦 新, Iura Arata), previously known as Arata, is a Japanese actor, model, and fashion designer. He is the Director of fashion brand Elnest Creative Activity. He holds the position of Director at the Artisan Culture Organisation Institute.

== Biography ==
Iura co-starred in Yukio Ninagawa's Snakes and Earrings with Yuriko Yoshitaka and Kengo Kora. He appeared in Junji Sakamoto's Strangers in the City. He portrayed Yukio Mishima in Koji Wakamatsu's 11:25 The Day He Chose His Own Fate. He also appeared in several of Hirokazu Koreeda's films, including After Life, Distance and Air Doll.

== Filmography ==
=== Film ===
- After Life (1998)
- Shady Grove (1999)
- Distance (2001)
- Ping Pong (2002)
- Aoi Kuruma (2004)
- Gina K (2005)
- Yaji and Kita: The Midnight Pilgrims (2005)
- The Prisoner (2007)
- Purukogi (2007)
- United Red Army (2007), Hiroshi Sakaguchi
- Snakes and Earrings (2008)
- 20th Century Boys (2008)
- Air Doll (2009)
- Ultra Miracle Love Story (2009)
- John Rabe (2009)
- Caterpillar (2010)
- Zatoichi: The Last (2010)
- Strangers in the City (2010)
- Kimi ni Todoke (2010)
- 11:25 The Day He Chose His Own Fate (2012), Yukio Mishima
- Our Homeland (2012)
- Bakugyaku Familia (2012)
- Sue, Mai & Sawa: Righting the Girl Ship (2012)
- The Millennial Rapture (2012)
- The Ravine of Goodbye (2013)
- Like Father, Like Son (2013)
- A Band Rabbit and a Boy (2013)
- Cape Nostalgia (2014)
- Asleep (2015), Iwanaga
- High & Low: The Movie (2016)
- And Then There Was Light (2017)
- Waiting for the Moon (2017)
- Smokin' on the Moon (2018), Sōta Amaya
- Red Snow (2018)
- Dare to Stop Us (2018), Kōji Wakamatsu
- The Negotiator: Behind The Reversion of Okinawa (2018)
- The Chrysanthemum and the Guillotine (2018), Genjirō Muraki
- Raiden (2019)
- Amber Light (2019)
- Dragon Quest: Your Story (2019), Grandmaster Nimzo (voice)
- Miyamoto (2019)
- Stolen Identity 2 (2020), Akira Hyodo
- True Mothers (2020), Kiyokazu Kurihara
- Ninja Girl (2021), Kōji Noma
- Photograph of Memories (2021)
- The Master (2021)
- The Road to Murder: The Movie (2021)
- Skeleton Flowers (2021)
- Parasite in Love (2021)
- Child of Kamiari Month (2021), Norimasa Hayama (voice)
- Niwatori Phoenix (2022), Sōta Amaya
- The World with Maki (2022)
- Rageaholic (2022)
- This Is Amiko (2022), Amiko's father
- September 1923 (2023), Tomokazu Sawada
- Undercurrent (2023), Takayuki Hori
- The Ex-idol, Stuck in Life, Decided to Live with a Complete Stranger (2023), Sasapon
- Tokyo Cowboy (2023), Hideki
- Dare to Stop Us 2 (2024), Kōji Wakamatsu
- Golden Kamuy (2024), Aca
- Last Mile (2024), Kei Nakado
- Adabana (2024)
- Stolen Identity: Final Hacking Game (2024), Akira Hyodo
- Thus Spoke Rohan Kishibe: At a Confessional (2025), Tamiya
- There Was Such a Thing Before (2025)
- Golden Kamuy: The Abashiri Prison Raid (2026), Aca
- Trophy (2026)

=== Television ===
- Mori no Asagao (2010)
- Mitsu no Aji: A Taste of Honey (2011)
- Taira no Kiyomori (2012), Emperor Sutoku
- Rich Man, Poor Woman (2012)
- The Negotiator: Behind The Reversion of Okinawa (2017)
- Unnatural (2018), Kei Nakado
- Natsuzora: Natsu's Sky (2019), Tsutomu Naka
- Nippon Noir (2019), Saimon Kaname
- Ru: Taiwan Express (2020), Makoto Anzai
- The Road to Murder (2020)
- Dearest (2021), Ken'ichiro Kase
- First Love (2022), Akihiko Tsushima
- The Makanai: Cooking for the Maiko House (2023), Masahiro Tanabe
- Dear Radiance (2024), Fujiwara no Michitaka
- Unmet: A Neurosurgeon's Diary (2024–27), Kōichi Ōsako
- Golden Kamuy: The Hunt of Prisoners in Hokkaido / Karafuto Pursuit Arc (2024–27), Aca
- Last Samurai Standing (2025), Ōkubo Toshimichi
- Blossom (2026), Yuzo Yamanaka

=== Documentary ===
- The Great Asian Highway (2015)

=== Video games ===
- Yakuza 0 (2015), Tetsu Tachibana
