= Distance (2001 film) =

2001 Japanese film by Hirokazu Kore-eda

- Directed by: Hirokazu Kore-eda
- Written by: Hirokazu Kore-eda
- Produced by: Masayuki Akieda
- Starring: Arata; Yūsuke Iseya; Susumu Terajima; Yui Natsukawa
- Cinematography: Yutaka Yamasaki
- Edited by: Hirokazu Kore-eda
- Release dates: May 10, 2001 (France); May 26, 2001 (Japan)
- Running time: 132 minutes
- Country: Japan
- Language: Japanese

Distance is a 2001 film by Japanese director Hirokazu Kore-eda, starring Arata, Tadanobu Asano, Yūsuke Iseya, Susumu Terajima, and Yui Natsukawa.

== Plot ==
Three years ago, members of a cult sabotaged Tokyo's water supply, killing hundreds and poisoning thousands, before committing mass suicide on the outskirts of town and having their ashes supposedly dispersed by a lake. On the anniversary of the attack, four members of the families of the perpetrators make the trek to that lake to remember them. When they arrive, they find that a motorcycle was there parked before them. At the dock, they see a former member of the cult, Sakata, who had trained for the attack but had defected at the last minute. He is distant and doesn't interact with them.

At the end of the day, they return to their vehicle only to find it missing. While they are discussing what to do as night approaches, Sakata comes and, finding that his motorcycle is also missing, leads them to the cabin where he and the deceased cult members stayed prior to the attack, and they pass the night reminiscing about people they have known and lost. Flashbacks illuminate the moments when the cult members told their families about leaving the real world to join the cult, Sakata's time with the cult and eventual escape, and the ensuing police investigation after the attack.

Sakata and Atsushi talk about Yûko, Atsushi's sister, whom Sakata had a very close relationship with and had asked to run away with him the night before the attack. Atsushi, according to Sakata, looks nothing like Yûko.

The next morning, they return by train to the city. On the train ride back, Sakata asks Atsushi who he really is, saying that Yuko told him her brother had killed himself a few years before. Atsushi says she was probably lying, and Sakata replies that she would not have said it that way if she were lying.

When Atsushi goes to see the old man he had been visiting in the hospital, the man has died. The nurse says that she had thought Atsushi was the old man's son, as he visited often, until the old man's actual son had come to the hospital after his death.

The film ends with Atsushi returning to the lake and dropping two flowers, one for his father, implied to be the cult leader, and one for his sister, while Sataka burns Yûko's family photos and memorabilia close by. The fire grows larger, and becomes a large conflagration as Atsushi walks away, leaving his past behind.

== Cast ==
- Arata – Mizuhara Atsushi, flower shop worker
- Yūsuke Iseya – Enoki Masaru, former swimming instructor
- Susumu Terajima – Kai Minoru, salaryman
- Yui Natsukawa – Yamamoto Kiyoka, teacher
- Tadanobu Asano – Sakata, surviving member
- Ryo – Yûko

== Production ==
Kore-eda was originally interested in the disciples of Aum Shinrikyo, which had committed the Tokyo subway sarin attack. He did not intend for the film to be a direct critique of these types of sects but rather that it would bring attention to everybody's civic responsibility to stopping such attacks and "how each individual is directly related to or is responsible for a criminal act".

There was a lot of improvisation when it came to shooting the film. Each of the main actors had information withheld about the other characters' backstory and were instead given the scenarios in which the characters would interact. The relationships between the characters were thus loosely built upon the actors' real world interactions.

Much of the film's rural shooting took place around Kiyosato, Yamanashi Prefecture and the forests of neighbouring Nagano Prefecture.

== Reception ==
On review aggregate website Rotten Tomatoes, Distance has a score of 80%, with an average rating of 6.3/10 based on 5 reviews.

== Awards ==
This film was nominated for the Golden Palm award at the 2001 Cannes Film Festival.
