= Sae Isshiki =

Japanese actress (born 1977)

Sae Isshiki (一色 紗英, Isshiki Sae) (born April 29, 1977) is a Japanese actress. She starred in the film Kura (藏) in 1995, for which she garnered the Newcomer of the Year award from the Japan Academy Film Prize Association. She also starred in a TV program named Futari (Two).

Preceded by Maki Sakai	The fifth rehouse girl of Mitsui; 1991-1992	Succeeded by Ayako Fujitani
