= Ryunosuke Kamiki =

Japanese actor (born 1993)

- 神木 隆之介
- Kamiki at the 2026 New York Film Festival
- Born: 19 May 1993 (age 33); Fujimi, Saitama, Japan
- Occupation: Actor
- Years active: 1995–present
- Agent(s): Central Group (1995–2005); Amuse, Inc. (2006–2021); Co-LaVo (2021–present)
- Spouse: Unknown (m. 2026)

Ryunosuke Kamiki (神木 隆之介, Kamiki Ryūnosuke; born 19 May 1993) is a Japanese actor. Starting his career as a child actor, he has garnered critical acclaim and numerous awards for his performances across 25 years in the industry.

Kamiki debuted in a 1995 commercial. Four years later, he had a leading role in the television drama Good News (1999). His early film roles include Spirited Away (2001), Bayside Shakedown 2 (2003), Howl's Moving Castle (2004), Doraemon: Nobita's Dinosaur 2006 (2006) and Big Man Japan (2007). He had his first leading roles in Takashi Miike's The Great Yokai War (2005) and Daihachi Yoshida's The Kirishima Thing (2012) and played supporting characters in Keishi Ōtomo's jidaigeki actioners Rurouni Kenshin: Kyoto Inferno and Rurouni Kenshin: The Legend Ends as well as Miike's horror film As the Gods Will (all 2014).

In 2016, Kamiki voiced the lead in Makoto Shinkai's anime film Your Name, for which he won the Best Actor Award at the 11th Seiyu Awards. After this, he collaborated with Shinkai again on Weathering with You (2019) and Suzume (2022) as supporting characters. Kamiki later co-starred with Minami Hamabe in two productions released in 2023: the TV drama series Ranman and Takashi Yamazaki's Godzilla Minus One. His performance in the latter earned him global critical acclaim and the Blue Ribbon Award for Best Actor. He would later reprise his role as Koichi in Godzilla Minus Zero (2026).

== Biography ==
Kamiki was born on 19 May 1993, in Saitama Prefecture. He was fragile in infancy, spending months in intensive care, and at one point was given only a 1% chance of survival. He was not discharged from the hospital until he was seven months of age. Doctors believed that even if he survived, he would live his life with disability. His mother came up with the idea of making him a child actor to leave concrete proof of his existence. His family consists of his grandparents, father, mother, an older sister (11 years older than him) and two nieces. His grandmother died in 2020.

== Career ==
Kamiki began acting as a child actor after entering the Central Group talent agency. His first commercial was for a Toy Box when he was only two years old. He made his television debut with the 1999 drama Good News in a lead role. In 2001, when he was eight years old, he was personally scouted by Hayao Miyazaki. Kamiki went on to voice characters in many of Studio Ghibli's feature films, giving him the title of the Ghibli Child. In 2004, he led the film Backdrop del mio Papa, for which he won his first award. In the following years, he continued to work both as an actor and voice actor, winning awards every two years. Kamiki won the Rookie Award 2020 at the Elan d'or Awards, one of the most prestigious awards in Japan.

On 16 March 2021, Kamiki left Amuse and founded Co-LaVo along with Takeru Satoh.

=== Other ventures ===
Kamiki wrote his first book Master's Cafe: The Fulfillment of Masters' Dreams in 2015. He approached fifteen professionals who are active on the front lines of various fields. In 2019, he made his stage debut with the play Beautiful: The Woman Who Met with God, written and directed by Suzuki Matsuo. The following year, he debuted in multiple fields such as a radio host for All Night Nippon 0 (ANN0), directing the music video for "I Treasure You" and opened his official YouTube channel. He was also the official photographer for Satoh's 2021 calendar. In 2020, he started to conceptualize his annual calendar.

The 2021 calendar, one part of the 25th anniversary project, was started when "Novel characters I want Kamiki to play" video was posted on his Twitter, urging fans to suggest novel characters for him to portray. It garnered reactions from many celebrities, including voice actor Yuki Kaji and film director Shunji Iwai, among others. Finally, twelve novels were selected from the retweets to represent the themes for the twelve months. The lineup expanded from classics to more recent pieces. The calendar shot by the renowned photographer and film director Mika Ninagawa was a new attempt to play different roles for twelve works in the calendar. As Yonosuke in Ihara Saikaku's The Life of an Amorous Man for August, props such as smoke tubes are used in a colorful set to express the sex appeal of adults that has never been seen before by him, and the novel published in May cover, No Longer Human (as Ōba Yōzō), the darkness of human beings and the beauty of men are produced. Of the twelve novels so far, Mysterious Weather at Yanaka's Retro Camera Store (as Imamiya Ryūichi) and Hamlet (as Ophelia), including the prior mentioned works have been confirmed. For this project, Kamiki sported silver hair for the first time, with shooting taking two days to complete. The calendar was sold on 25 December 2020, to signify the 25 year anniversary.

Kamiki was invited to be the photographer for Takeru Satoh's 2021 Calendar. The concept of a "photobook-like calendar" featured natural expressions when spending time with friends—with a sense of distance that can be taken by an old friend. It is a special calendar taken in places where Satoh wants to go with Kamiki and where he would like to take pictures of him, such as driving the car, in Shibuya and Harajuku, in maid cafes, etc. He took over eight thousand photos. Some are excluded in the desk calendar. He wants to have a photo exhibition and albums.

In 2022, Kamiki excavated one of the world's oldest ichthyosaur fossils in Minamisanriku in his first fossil excavation during the filming of From Miyagi. The fossil is on display at the Minasan Museum.

== Artistry and public image ==
In the award-winning The Great Yokai War, he overcame his fear of swimming. For his role in Kokoro no Ito, he learned sign language and the piano. In 2022, he was voted the Most Powerful Actor in Japan.

== Personal life ==
On February 10, 2026, Kamiki announced his marriage to his non-celebrity girlfriend.

== Filmography ==
=== Films ===
==== Live-action ====
Year	Title	Role	Ref(s)
2003	Rockers	Taku (young)	
2003	Bayside Shakedown 2		
2004	Backdrop del mio Papa	Kazuo	
2004	Ren'ai Shōsetsu ("Love Story")	Satoshi Kubo (young)	
2004	Install	Kazuyoshi Aoki	
2004	Survive Style 5+	Keiichi Kobayashi	
2005	Zoo		
2005	The Great Yokai War	Tadashi Ino	
2007	Big Man Japan	Warabe-no-jū	
2008	Into the Faraway Sky	Ryūnosuke Kusunoki	
2008	Little DJ: Chiisana Koi no Monogatari	Tarō Takano	
2009	20th Century Boys 3: Redemption	Katsumata	
2012	SPEC: Heaven	Ninomae Jūichi	
2012	The Kirishima Thing	Ryōya Maeda	
2013	SPEC: Close	Ninomae Jūichi	
2014	Rurouni Kenshin: Kyoto Inferno	Seta Sōjirō	
2014	Rurouni Kenshin: The Legend Ends	Seta Sōjirō	
2014	As the Gods Will	Takeru Amaya	
2015	Bakuman	Akito Takagi	
2015	Poison Berry in My Brain	Ishibashi	
2016	The Sun	Tetsuhiko Okudera	
2016	Too Young To Die!	Daisuke	
2017	March Comes in Like a Lion	Rei Kiriyama	
2017	March Goes Out Like a Lamb	Rei Kiriyama	
2017	JoJo's Bizarre Adventure: Diamond Is Unbreakable	Koichi Hirose	
2017	Tales of Chigasaki	Jun'ichi Miyaji	
2019	Fortuna's Eye	Shin'ichiro Kiyama	
2019	Murders at the House of Death	Yuzuru Hamura	
2020	Last Letter	Kyōshirō Otosaka (young)	
2021	Rurouni Kenshin: The Final	Seta Sōjirō	
2021	The Great Yokai War: Guardians	Katō	
2022	Noise	Shin'ichirō Moriya	
2022	xxxHolic	Kimihiro Watanuki	
2022	Yokaipedia	Antiquarian bookshop owner	
2022	Dr. Coto's Clinic 2022	Ryūichi Sugimoto	
2023	We're Broke, My Lord!	Matsudaira Koshirō	
2023	Godzilla Minus One	Kōichi Shikishima	
2024	Saint Young Men: The Movie	Johannes	
2024	At the Bench		
2026	Your Own Quiz	Kizuna Honjo	
2026	Godzilla Minus Zero	Kōichi Shikishima	
2026	Bayside Shakedown: N.E.W		

==== Animation ====
Year	Title	Role	Ref(s)
2001	Spirited Away	Boh	
2003	Kirikou and the Sorceress	Kirikou	
2004	Howl's Moving Castle	Markl	
2006	Doraemon: Nobita's Dinosaur 2006	Piisuke	
2006	Hoshi o Katta Hi	Nona	
2008	Piano Forest	Shūhei Amamiya	
2009	Summer Wars	Kenji Koiso	
2010	Arrietty	Sho	
2011	The Princess and the Pilot	Charles Karino	
2016	Your Name	Taki Tachibana	
2017	Mary and the Witch's Flower	Peter	
2019	Weathering with You	Taki Tachibana	
2020	Doraemon: Nobita's New Dinosaur	Piisuke (Archive voice from 2006 film)	
2021	The Crocodile That Lived for 100 Days	Crocodile	
2021	Evangelion: 3.0+1.0 Thrice Upon a Time	Shinji Ikari (Adulthood)	
2022	Suzume	Tomoya Serizawa	

=== Television ===
==== Live-action ====
Year	Title	Role	Notes	Ref(s)
1999	Good News	Naoya		
2000	Aoi Tokugawa Sandai	Gorōtamaru	Taiga drama	
2000	Namida o Fuite	Ryota Fuchigami		
2000	Quiz			
2000	The Woman of S.R.I. Season 2	Yusuke	Episode 2	
2000	Tekkoki Mikazuki	Fuo Iwado (young)	Episode 6	
2001	Kamen Rider Agito	Overlord of Darkness (young); Overload of Light (young)	Dual role	
2001	Doctor/Kranke	Kenta Oikawa		
2001	Hamidashi Keiji Jonetsu Kei Season 6	Sakanuma Ryo	Episodes 6 and 20	
2001	Maria	Kondo Masashi	Episode 7	
2001	Mukodono!	Arai Tsutomu		
2001	Shingo Mama Drama Special Ooh Will Save the World	Ken		
2002	Psycho Doctor	Kitamura Kenta	Episode 6	
2002	Tantei Kazoku	Tanaka Taro		
2002	Wedding Planner	Terashima Taku		
2002	Omiya	Seiichiro		
2002	Kanojotachi no Christmas			
2002	Emergency Room 24 Hours Special	Toinomoto Ryo		
2003	Bakuryuu Sentai Abaranger	Kerato	Episode 36	
2003	Boku no Mahōtsukai	Michio (young)		
2003	Dr. Coto's Clinic	Ryuichi Sugimoto	Episodes 5, 7, and 11	
2003	Shizumanai Hone	Shota	TV movie	
2004	Ōoku	Iemochi Tokugawa		
2004	Ōoku 3 SP: Bakumatsu no Onnatachi	Tokugawa Iemochi		
2004	Re'nai Shōsetsu	Kubo Satoshi (young)		
2004	Dr. Coto's Clinic 2004 Special	Ryuichi Sugimoto		
2005	The Life Heritage	Ryota Nakajima		
2005	Charming	Horo Mashiba		
2005	Yoshitsune	Ushiwakamaru	Taiga drama	
2006	Tokyo Tower: Mom and Me, and Sometimes Dad Special	Nakagawa Masaya (young)		
2006	Detective School Q Special	Renjō Kyu		
2007	Dondo Hare	Tomoya Asakura	Asadora	
2007	Ruri no Shima Special 2007: Hatsukoi	Miyahara Shion	TV movie	
2007	Tantei Gakuen Q	Renjo Kyu		
2007	Amazing World	Yuji		
2008	Kaze no Gāden			
2009	Akahana no Sensei			
2010	Bloody Monday		Episodes 6, 7	
2010	Keizoku 2 "Spec"	Ninomae Juichi		
2010	Kokoro no Ito		TV movie	
2011	Koukousei Restaurant	Yōsuke Sakamoto		
2011	Odd Family Eleven	Kazuo Sanada		
2012	Kiyomori	Minamoto no Yoshitsune	Taiga drama	
2012	Blackboard: Teachers Against the Tide of Time	Omiya Masaki	Episode 3	
2012	SPEC: Life	Ninomae Juichi		
2013	The Family Game	Shin'ichi Numata		
2013	SPEC: Zero	Ninomae Juichi		
2013	Kogure Shashinkan	Hanabishi Eiichi		
2013	SPEC: Close – Incarnation	Ninomae Juichi		
2013	SPEC: Close – Reincarnation	Ninomae Juichi		
2014	Henshin	Jun'ichi Naruse		
2014	Fathers	Tatsuya	Episode 9	
2014	The Files of Young Kindaichi Neo	Kurasuma Hikaru	Episode 1	
2014	Tales of the Unusual: Fall 2014	Shirai Naoki		
2014	Time Slip!	Aoyama Hikaru	Web drama	
2014	Toki wa Tachidomaranai	Hamaguchi Mitsuhiko		
2015	The Girl's Speech	Kei Shizukui		
2015	Samurai Teacher	Sakamoto Ryōma		
2017	Detective Yugami	Hanyu Toaro	Lead role	
2017	Yasuragi no Sato	Hamura Shunichiro	Week 26	
2018	School Lawyer Shotaro Taguchi	Shotaro Taguchi	Lead role	
2018	True Horror Stories: Summer 2018	Sasaki Yusuke		
2019	Idaten: The Epic Marathon to Tokyo	Gorin	Taiga drama	
2019	Everyone's Demoted!!	Kōji Takigawa		
2020	Bones of Steel	Heita Tomishima	Lead role	
2020	Sanjūjinkaku to Mahōtsukai	Himself		
2020	True Horror Stories: Summer 2020	Ozawa Naoya		
2021	Ojisama to Neko	Fukumaru (voice)		
2021	Life's Punchline	Shunta Asabuki		
2021	Life's Punchline's Spinoff Makubes no 23-ji	Shunta Asabuki		
2022	A Day-Off of Ryunosuke Kamiki	Himself	Lead role; miniseries	
2022	If My Wife Becomes an Elementary School Student.	Yūri Koga		
2023	Ranman	Mantarō Makino	Lead role; Asadora	
2024	The Diamond Sleeping Under the Sea	Teppei Araki / Reo Kusaka	Lead role	
2025	Pray Speak What Has Happened	Shogo Horai		

==== Television animation ====
Year	Title	Role	Network	Notes	Ref(s)
2021	Ani × Para	Yukihiro	NHK-BS1	Episode 12	
2021	Ao and Kii	Ao	NHK-E	Lead role	

=== Theater ===
Year	Title	Role	Ref(s)
2019	Kirei: Kamisama no machiawase shita onna	Harikona	
2020	Don't Turn Out the Lights! Bunkamura Theatre Cocoon		
2021	Pa Rum Pum Pum Pum	Editor	

=== Dubbing ===
Live-action

Year	Title	Role	Voice dub for	Notes	Ref(s)
2004	I, Cesar	Cesar	Jules Sitruk		
2005	March of the Penguins	The chicks	Jules Sitruk		
2021	Parasite	Kim Ki-woo	Choi Woo-shik	NTV edition	

Animation

Year	Title	Role	Ref(s)
2003	Kirikou and the Sorceress	Kirikou	
2006	Arthur and the Invisibles	Arthur	
2009	Arthur and the Vengeance of Maltazard	Arthur	

== Awards and nominations ==
Year	Nominee / work	Award	Result
2004	Backdrop del mio Papa	The Japanese Movie Critics Awards 2004: Rookie of the Year	Won
2006	The Great Yokai War	The 29th Japan Academy Film Prize: Newcomers of the Year	Won
2007	Tantei Gakuen Q (2007)	54th Japanese Drama Academy Awards: Lead Actor	Won
2011	Kokoro no Ito	Seoul International Drama Awards: Popular Actor	Won
2011	Kokoro no Ito	Mipcom Buyers' Award for Japanese Drama	Won
2011	Kokoro no Ito	47th Hugo TV Awards Feature Film Category Gold Award	Won
2011	Kokoro no Ito	51st Monte-Carlo Television Festival: Best Actor	Nominated
2011	Kokoro no Ito	51st Monte-Carlo Television Festival: The AMADE Prize	Won
2012	The Kirishima Thing and SPEC: Heaven	Tama Cinema Forum: Best Emerging Actor	Won
2012	The Kirishima Thing	37th Hochi Film Award: Best Actor	Nominated
2014	Fathers	Galaxy Monthly Awards: TV	Won
2013	The Family Game	The 17th Nikkan Sports Drama Grand Prix Spring: Best Supporting Actor	Won
2013	The Family Game	The 77th The Television Drama Academy: Best Supporting Actor	Won
2013	The Family Game	The 23rd TVLife Drama Award 2013: Best Supporting Actor	Won
2015	Poison Berry in My Brain and Bakuman	40th Hochi Film Awards	
2015	Popularity	Seoul International Drama Awards: Asian Stars	Won
2015	The Girl's Speech/Samurai Teacher	TV Navi's Drama Awards 2015	Won
2016	Too Young to Die!	Fantasia Film Festival: Best Asian Feature Silver	Won
2016	Too Young To Die!	Rotterdam International Film Festival: Netpac Award	Nominated
2016	Too Young To Die!	New York Asian Film Festival: Audience Award	Won
2017	March Comes in Like a Lion	42nd Hochi Film Award: Best Actor	Nominated
2017	Your Name	The 11th Seiyu Awards: Best Lead Actor	Won
2018	Detective Yugami	The 10th CONFiDENCE AWARD DRAMA PRIZE: Best Supporting Actor	Won
2018	Detective Yugami	The 95th Drama Academy Award: Best Supporting Actor	Won
2020	Idaten: The Epic Marathon to Tokyo	The 44th Elan d'or Awards: Best Producer	Won
2020	Idaten: The Epic Marathon to Tokyo and Fortuna's Eye	The 44th Elan d'or Awards: Newcomer of the Year	Won
2021	Life's Punchline	The 108th The Television Drama Academy Awards: Jury Votes	Won
2024	Godzilla Minus One	The 66th Blue Ribbon Awards: Best Actor	Won
2024	Godzilla Minus One	The 47th Japan Academy Film Prize: Best Actor	Nominated

== Other works ==
=== Books ===
Year	Title	Publisher	Note	ISBN	Ref.
2005	Photobook My Bōken	Kadokawa Shoten	By Kentaro Atsuchi	978-4-048-53882-4	
2005	Boy Actor vol.1	Pia	Magazine cover / long gravure	978-4-835-61593-6	
2006	BOYS: GRASSROOTS	INFAS Publications	Magazine January issue cover / main gravure	978-4-900-78537-3	
2015	Kamiki Ryunosuke's Master's Cafe: The Fulfillment of Masters' Dreams	Magazine House	Writer	978-4-8387-2800-8	
2017	Sincérité	Amuse	Photobook		
2020	Omote Kamiki / Ura Kamiki	Amuse	Autobiography		
2023	KamikiKochi	NHK Publishing / Co-LaVo	Travel guidebook	978-4-1408-1931-9	
2027	Ryunosuke Kamiki 30th Anniversary Book	Kadokawa	Photobook with interviews with several people	978-4-0490-2663-4	

=== Magazine serialization ===
Year	Title	Publisher	Ref.
2013–2015	Kamiki Ryunosuke's Master's Cafe	AnAn	

=== Direction ===
Title	Year	Note	Ref.
"I Treasure You" MV	2019	15th Anniversary SUPER HANDSOME COLLECTION 「JUMP↑」	

=== Photography ===
Title	Year	Notes	Ref.
Takeru Satoh's 2021 calendar	2020	Calendar	
The two of us, breathing along with this night	2020	Written by Ichi Kitahara. Book cover	

=== Documentary ===
Year	Title	Role	Network	Ref.
2001	Chosuke Ikariya Wild Africa Adventure: Travel 16,000 km with an 8-year-old best friend	Guest	TV Tokyo	
2012	The Future of the Earth! Urgent Report: "Thinking with Seiji Miyane! What is a sustainable world?"	Narrator	NTV	
2012	Newly Discovered Art Variety "Aho! World!"	Guest, Narrator	Fuji TV	
2013	Newly Discovered Art Variety "Aho!"	Studio Guest, Narrator	Fuji TV	
2014	Ryunosuke Kamiki 20-year-old trip Going to the Vietnam border railway-in search of the most beautiful terraced rice fields in the world	Host	BS Japan	
2015	NHK Special NEXT WORLD Our Future	Host	NHK	
2020	Coronavirus, Youth, Us: Swimming club's last summer of high school	Narrator	NHK	
2021	Butterfly Effect because that day exists, now exists.	Narrator	NHK General TV	

=== Narration ===
Year	Title	Role	Ref.
2010	The Legend of Alma: The Story of a Dog You Don't Know	Alma's Voice	
2013	How Nollywood movies are made. Nigeria's "World's Best Movie City": Dreams and Fervor		

=== Radio ===
==== Program ====
Year	Title	Station	Note	Ref.
2020	Kamiki Ryunosuke All Night Nippon 0 (ZERO)	Nippon Broadcasting System		
2021	Kamiki Ryunosuke no RADIO MOG STATION presented by Final Fantasy XIV	TOKYO FM and other JFN 38 stations nationwide	Live Radio YouTube	

==== Drama ====
Year	Title	Role	Station	Ref.
2005	Bonkura	Santaro Odeko	ABC Radio	
2006	Daily life	Santaro Odeko	ABC Radio	

=== Web drama ===
Year	Title	Role	Note	Ref.
2014	Time Slip! Yasubee Horibe	Mitsuru Aoyama		
2018–ongoing	Ishiki takasugi! Takasugi-kun	Takasugi-kun	CM Series	

=== Audio drama ===
Year	Title	Role	Distributor	Notes	Ref.
2021	300-Nen Go Nihon Mukashibanashi	Riimantaro	Numa	voicing 7 characters	
2021	Koi Samurai	Ochiai Masayasu	Numa	is being novelized	

=== Music video appearances ===
Year	Song title	Artist	Ref.
2004	"Aja"	Southern All Stars	
2004	"Strike"	Suneohair	
2007	"Sweet Fragrance (Movie Ver.)"	Cocco	
2012	"The sun rises again"	Yu Takahashi	
2018	"Sasanqua"	Sekai no Owari	

=== Drama CD ===
Year	Title	Role
2003	Lagoon Engine	Jin Ragun

=== Game ===
Year	Title	Role	Reff
2010	Zack and Ombra: The Forgotten Amusement Park	Zack	

=== Discography ===
Year	Title	Role	Reff
2016	"TOO YOUNG TO DIE! Hell's Song Hell"	Guitarist	
2016	"TOO YOUNG TO DIE!"	Vocals	
2016	"Heaven"	Vocals	
