= Taira no Kiyomori (TV series) =

Japanese television series

- Japanese: 平清盛
- Genre: Taiga drama
- Written by: Yuki Fujiumoto
- Directed by: Takeshi Shibata
- Starring: Kenichi Matsuyama; Hiroshi Tamaki; Shota Matsuda; Naohito Fujiki; Kyoko Fukada; Hiroshi Mikami; Ai Kato; Kōsuke Toyohara; Gō Morita; Riko Narumi; Masataka Kubota; Masaki Okada; Anne Watanabe; Ryunosuke Kamiki; Rei Dan; Koji Yamamoto; Rena Tanaka; Emi Takei; Sadao Abe; Arata Iura; Hisashi Yoshizawa; Kōji Katō; Seiko Matsuda; Fumiyo Kohinata; Takashi Ukaji; Emi Wakui; Yasuko Matsuyuki; Takaya Kamikawa; Jun Kunimura; Nakamura Baijaku II; Shirō Itō; Kiichi Nakai
- Narrated by: Masaki Okada
- Opening theme: NHK Symphony Orchestra
- Composer: Takashi Yoshimatsu
- Country of origin: Japan
- Original language: Japanese
- No. of episodes: 50

Original release
- Network: NHK
- Release: January 8 – December 23, 2012

Taira no Kiyomori (平清盛) is a 2012 Japanese historical television series. It is the 51st NHK taiga drama.

== Production ==
Production Credits

- Original – Yuki Fujiumoto
- Music – Takashi Yoshimatsu
- Titling – Shōko Kanazawa
- Narrator – Masaki Okada
- Historical research – Masaaki Takahashi
- Sword fight arranger - Kunishirō Hayashi
- Architectural research – Sei Hirai
- Clothing research – Kiyoko Koizumi

== Cast ==
=== Taira clan (Heike) ===
- Kenichi Matsuyama as Taira no Kiyomori, a military leader of the late Heian period of Japan
  - Ōshirō Maeda as young Kiyomori
- Kiichi Nakai as Taira no Tadamori, the father of Taira no Kiyomori
- Atsuo Nakamura as Taira no Masamori
- Kōsuke Toyohara as Taira no Tadamasa
- Nakamura Baijaku II as Taira no Iesada
- Kyoko Fukada as Taira no Tokiko, Kiyomori's wife
- Ai Kato as Takashina no Akiko
- Takaya Kamikawa as Taira no Morikuni
- Go Morita as Taira no Tokitada
- Takahiro Fujimoto as Itō Tadakiyo
- Shunsuke Daito as Taira no Iemori
- Takahiro Nishijima as Taira no Yorimori
- Masataka Kubota as Taira no Shigemori
  - Takuma Hiraoka as young Shigemori
- Hideo Ishiguro as Taira no Munemori
  - Takuya Kusakawa as young Munemori
- Koji Kato as Usagimaru
- Mahiro Takasugi as Kousagimaru
- Emi Wakui as Ikenozenni
- Riko Narumi as "Kenshunmon-in" Shigeko
- Fumi Nikaido as Taira no Tokuko
- Tsuyoshi Muro as Taira no Tadanori

=== Minamoto clan (Genji) ===
- Fumiyo Kohinata as Minamoto no Tameyoshi, a head of the Minamoto samurai clan
- Hiroshi Tamaki as Minamoto no Yoshitomo
- Rena Tanaka as Yura Gozen
- Emi Takei as Tokiwa Gozen
- Masaki Okada as Minamoto no Yoritomo, Yoshitomo's third son / Narrator
  - Taishi Nakagawa as young Yoritomo
- Ryunosuke Kamiki as Minamoto no Yoshitsune, Yoshitomo's ninth son
  - Ryunosuke Hashino as young Yoshitsune (a.k.a. Ushiwakamaru)
- Munetaka Aoki as Benkei
- Takashi Ukaji as Minamoto no Yorimasa
- Kenichi Endō as Hōjō Tokimasa
- Mayumi Tsukiyama as Maki no Kata
- Anne as Hōjō Masako
- Takuya Nakayama as Hōjō Yoshitoki
- Takashi Tsukamoto as Tōkurō
- Saki Fukuda as Yae, Yoritomo's first wife.

=== Imperial family ===
- Shirō Itō as Emperor Shirakawa, the 72nd emperor of Japan
- Hiroshi Mikami as Emperor Toba, the 74th emperor of Japan
- Arata Iura as Emperor Sutoku, the 75th emperor of Japan
- Takumi Kitamura as Emperor Konoe, the 76th emperor of Japan
- Shota Matsuda as Emperor Go-Shirakawa, the 77th emperor of Japan
- Satoshi Tomiura as Emperor Nijō, the 78th emperor of Japan
- Yudai Chiba as Emperor Takakura, the 80th emperor of Japan
- Yūta Tanaka as Emperor Antoku, the 81st emperor of Japan

=== Others ===
- Naohito Fujiki as Saigyō
- Seiko Matsuda as Gion no nyōgo
- Yasuko Matsuyuki as Bifukumon'in
- Rei Dan as Taikenmon'in, the consort of Emperor Toba
- Sadao Abe as Shinzei
- Koji Yamamoto as Fujiwara no Yorinaga
- Keisuke Horibe as Fujiwara no Tadamichi
- Jun Kunimura as Fujiwara no Tadazane
- Shigeki Hosokawa as Fujiwara no Motofusa
- Hisashi Yoshizawa as Fujiwara no Narichika
- Toranosuke Kato as Saikō
- Toru Nomaguchi as Fujiwara no Korekata (episodes 25, 26, and 28)
  - Toshihiro Yashiba as Fujiwara no Korekata (episode 19)
- Manabu Hamada as Kajiwara Kagetoki
- Kō Takasugi as Kazusa Hirotsune
- Toshiya Nagasawa as Takeda Nobuyoshi
- Ryūta Mine as Itō Sukechika
- Seiji Kinoshita as Ōba Kagechika
- Shun Sugata as Miura Yoshiaki
- Hajime Tanimoto as Miura Yoshizumi, Yoshiaki's son
- Kenzō as Sasaki Hideyoshi
- Moro Moro'oka as Doi Sanehira
- Masakazu Itō as Chiba Tsunetane
- Ryū Nakamura as Yamaki Kanetaka
- Muga Tsukaji as Fujiwara no Nobuyori
- Masaki Kyomoto as Fujiwara no Hidehira
