= Seta Sōjirō =

Fictional character from Rurouni Kenshin

- Rurouni Kenshin character
- Seta Sōjirō on the cover of Rurouni Kenshin Kanzenban Volume 13
- First appearance: Rurouni Kenshin Act 56: Meiji 11, May 14th — Morning
- Created by: Nobuhiro Watsuki
- Portrayed by: Ryūnosuke Kamiki
- Voiced by: Japanese; Noriko Hidaka (1996 series); Daiki Yamashita (2023 series); English; Tara Jayne (1996 series; ep. 31–47); Lynn Fischer (1996 series; ep. 51 and 52); Melissa Fahn (1996 series; ep. 54–56, 61); Clint Bickham (New Kyoto Arc); Justin Briner (live-action films); Edward A. Mendoza (2023 series)

In-universe information
- Nicknames: "Heaven's Sword" (天剣, Tenken)
- Affiliations: Juppongatana

Seta Sōjirō (瀬田 宗次郎), addressed as Sojiro Seta in the English anime, is a fictional character from the Rurouni Kenshin manga series created by Nobuhiro Watsuki. He is Shishio Makoto's 16-year-old right-hand man. Sōjirō has been favorably popular with the Rurouni Kenshin reader base, placing high in several popularity polls.

== Creation and conception ==
Nobuhiro Watsuki has stated that the character design of Sōjirō is loosely based on Okita Sōji, the captain of the first Squad of the Shinsengumi. The name Seta Sōjirō originates from "Okita Sōjirō," the name Okita had in his early life. The specific personality model is from the Okita in Ryōtarō Shiba's novel Shinsengumi Keppūroku ("Record of Shinsengumi Bloodshed"); in that version Okita "lost an important part in his human heart," making him without emotions and "pretty scary." Watsuki reported that some fans did not like the fact that a character modeled on Okita is a villain; Watsuki argued that since Sōjirō is based on the Shinsengumi Keppuroku Okita, the design "works well" and that Sōjirō is "a strong antagonist." Watsuki felt that Sōjirō was more difficult to draw than Watsuki initially anticipated, and that he only accomplished around one fourth of what he imagined the character would appear in his mind. Watsuki had no design model for Sōjirō; Watsuki envisioned Okita as having bangs (fringes), so to Watsuki it was no surprise that Sōjirō also had bangs. Watsuki gave Sōjirō a "slightly feminized air" so that Sōjirō's smile would "look good" on the character. In Volume 9 Watsuki stated that he wants to properly portray Sōjirō since he is a popular character.

The fact that Sōjirō has no emotions is also based on Shiba's version of Okita Sōji. Watsuki said that this concept became one of the most difficult aspects to reflect in the drawing. Okita died when he was young, but Watsuki decided not to kill Sōjirō in the story in order to atone for the murders he committed, but instead start living on his own instead of having someone make his decisions for him. He hoped to draw him in more of the next chapters but soon thought that would not be possible.

== Character outline ==
=== Personality ===
Sōjirō as he appears in the first anime.

Sōjirō is Shishio's right-hand man, a young assassin trained by Shishio himself. Sōjirō is known for his lack of kenki (offensive aura) in a fight, his apparent emotionless state reflected also in his sarcasm and polite manners with his smile hiding his true feelings. However, he does have a special relationship with Komagata Yumi, who functions as an older-sister figure towards him. Sōjirō usually dresses up in a blue kimono with white handguards.

=== Plot ===
Born in Kanagawa Prefecture in September of the first year of Bunkyū (1861), Sōjirō is an illegitimate child who was badly mistreated by his father's family to the point of being beaten for faltering in his tasks. To build a tolerance to the beatings, Sōjirō put on a smiling face as his tormenters decide to let him be. One night, at age six, Sōjirō witnessed the recently scarred Shishio Makoto killing two police officers and was spared due to the criminal seeing the boy's smile. While secretly feeding Shishio and providing him with bandages, Sōjirō takes the man's ideals to heart while receiving a wakizashi. When his family learned that he is harboring Shishio and decide to murder the child and pin the blame on the fugitive, Sōjirō uses the wakizashi Shishio gave him to slaughter his family. Soon after, once Shishio's wounds are healed, Sōjirō travels with him as his right hand and member of the Jupongatana.

Sōjirō first appears in the storyline when he uses his superhuman speed to reach and assassinate government official Ōkubo Toshimichi, also killing the official's would-be samurai assassins who would historically take credit for Ōkubo's death nonetheless. Later, after Senkaku's defeat, Sōjirō duels with Kenshin using Battōjutsu with the fight ending in a tie when their swords shattered. Sōjirō is then assigned by Shishio to gather the Jupongatana located in the east side of Japan.

When Kenshin finally arrives at the Room of Reduced Space in Shishio's lair, he finds Sōjirō waiting for him and at first has the upper hand due to his superior speed. But when the confrontation forces Sōjirō to question Shishio's principles, his true emotions surface with allowing Kenshin now able to read his moves and defeat him. Despite his defeat, Sōjirō informs Yumi of the key to Kenshin's ultimate attack while asking her to give Shishio the wakizashi that kept before leaving.

In the aftermath of Shishio's death, Sōjirō becomes a wanderer to find his own truth and ideals. Five years later, he makes his way to Hokkaido where he is reunited with fellow Jupongatana member Yūkyūzan Anji, who was being escorted to Hakodate by Sugimura Yoshie (Nagakura Shinpachi), and joins them.

=== Techniques ===
Sōjirō's shukuchi is fast enough that he can run on walls and instantaneously appear behind Himura Kenshin.

Sōjirō's apparent lack of emotion, his simple, cold-blooded mentality that the strong will live and the weak shall die (弱肉強食, jakuniku kyōshoku; an idiom for "survival of the fittest" or "law of the jungle"), and his skills make him a formidable foe for Kenshin. As a master swordsman of his own style, Sōjirō's abilities have earned him the nickname of "Heaven's Sword" (天剣, Tenken; Ten meaning Heaven and Ken meaning Sword, "Tenken" means swordsmanship of natural endowments). His shukuchi utilizes such powerful speed that, to an observer, it appears that the distance between the two fighters has shrunk (hence the name shukuchi, which means "reduced earth").

During his fight with Kenshin, Sōjirō continually states he's only moving "three steps below shukuchi" or "two steps below shukuchi." While moving at the speed his shukuchi utilizes, the only thing that can be seen is Sōjirō's footsteps ripping through the tatami mats. During "one step below shukuchi", he is able to attack from an omni-directional angle, utilizing not only horizontal but vertical space. While performing true shukuchi, he completely disappears and cannot be seen, even by Kenshin. Sōjirō can dodge the Kuzu-ryūsen (九頭龍閃; lit. 'Nine-headed Dragon Flash'), a move which apparently cannot be evaded even by Kenshin himself. Sōjirō is also the first one ever to slash Kenshin in the back in the series.

Sōjirō is also well versed in the Battōjutsu style like Kenshin, as is evident when he decides to use a stance similar to Kenshin's and when he destroys Kenshin's first sakabatō. Combining the true speed of shukuchi with the Battōjutsu, he has created his only named technique, Shuntensatsu (瞬天殺; lit. 'Instant Heaven Kill'), meaning "immediate killing by heaven's sword". It is named this because the speed behind the attack is so swift that the opponent not only dies before falling to the floor, but there isn't even time to experience pain. Judging by its appearance in the anime, it appears that the Shuntensatsu is very similar to Kenshin's Amakakeru Ryu no Hirameki, except that it uses speed rather than strength.

== In other media ==
Ryunosuke Kamiki is cast as Sōjirō in two live-action adaptations of the Kyoto arc: Rurouni Kenshin: Kyoto Inferno and Rurouni Kenshin: The Legend Ends. He would later reprise his role in Rurouni Kenshin: The Final as an ally to Kenshin.

In Rurouni Kenshin: The Hokkaido Arc, Sōjirō has become a wanderer to find his own truth and ideals. He makes his way to Hokkaido where he is reunited with fellow Jupongatana member Yūkyūzan Anji.

== Reception ==
Daryl Surat of Otaku USA said that while Sōjirō is a "kid," the character scored highly in popularity polls among readers because Sōjirō always smiles despite the abuse inflicted upon him. Surat used Sōjirō as an example for labeling Rurouni Kenshin what he calls "neo-shonen"; a work that appeals to both boys and girls. The inclusion of Seta Sojiro in The Final was praised for Ryunosuke Kamiki's performance as the character became an aid to Kenshin and wants to see his resolution to his life as a pacifist while also enjoying the bigger focus on Misao and Saito. The romance between Kenshin and Kaoru was criticized though as being underdeveloped.
