= Shukuchi =

Supernatural technique of rapid movement

The word shukuchi (縮地) is a Japanese-language term for various mythical techniques of rapid movement. The characters in the word can be rendered literally as "shrinking the earth," referring to how the technique reduces the spatial distance between two points to achieve its effect.

== History ==
The word first appears in the Chinese Shenxian Zhuan to describe the ability of the Daoist magician Fei Changfang.

房有神術、
能縮地脈、
千里存在、
目前宛然、
放之、
復舒如舊也。

— Shenxian Zhuan as cited in Taiping Guangji
Translation:

Fei Changfang has a divine ability,
he can shrink the Earthly veins (meridians).
Be a thing thousand li away,
it would appear right before his eyes.
And if he let the meridians go,
they would turn loose, the way they were.

The term 縮地脈 suōdìmài denotes the power of teleportation attributed to some xiān. Those possessing this ability were believed to be capable of moving vast distances in a single step. The term is sometimes used to refer to a similar ability in Buddhism.

The Japanese terms shukuchihō (縮地法), shukuchijutsu (縮地術) or tonchijutsu (遁地術) are used for the same ability attributed to xian or yamabushi.

== Appearances ==
=== In martial arts ===
In modern Japanese martial arts, shukuchi refers to a sudden movement into an enemy's maai (space) or blind spot to attack. This definition is relatively recent, and is, therefore, used somewhat differently by various schools.

=== In Korea ===
In Korean traditional literature, such as Hong Gildong jeon, there are stories of heroes using such mystical techniques.

The ability of chukjibeop (축지법 縮地法) was attributed to North Korean leaders Kim Il Sung and Kim Jong Il in the propaganda song "The General Uses Warp" (장군님 축지법 쓰신다), which also becomes an Internet meme in South Korea. According to a quote in a DPRK official newspaper, the attribution is purely a metaphor for People's war.

=== In popular culture ===
Fictionalized versions of shukuchi are common in manga, anime and video games. In this context, it is usually portrayed as short-range teleportation or as the ability to move quickly enough to become invisible.

==== Manga and anime ====
- Son Goku, the main character of the Dragon Ball franchise, is seen performing this feat as a child and eventually masters the art of teleporting when an adult.
- Seta Sōjirō from Rurouni Kenshin can use shukuji.
- Various characters in Negima!: Magister Negi Magi employ such techniques.
- In the manga and anime Prince of Tennis the shukuchi method is used by players of the Higa Middle School from Okinawa to give the illusion of moving from the baseline of a tennis court to the net in a split second.

==== Video games ====
- Weaver, a character from the popular video game Dota 2, has an ability called Shukuchi, which allows it to become invisible and run with very high movement speed for a short period of time.
- In the Square Enix MMORPG Final Fantasy XIV, the Ninja job has an ability called Shukuchi which allows the user to move extremely quickly to a targeted location, almost teleporting.
- In the Touhou Project series, the sennin Toyosatomimi no Miko has a technique called Shukuchi Cape, which allows her to teleport.
- In the video game Danganronpa V3: Killing Harmony, the character Ryoma Hoshi mentions this technique as a way to escape others quickly.
- In the video game Fate/Grand Order, Shukuchi is one of Okita Souji's skills and a part of Ushiwakamaru's "Usumidori - Heavenly Blade Steps".
