= SPEC: Ten =

- Film poster
- Directed by: Yukihiko Tsutsumi
- Written by: Yumie Nishiogi
- Produced by: Hiroki Ueda; Natsuki Imai
- Starring: Erika Toda; Ryo Kase; Ryūnosuke Kamiki; Chiaki Kuriyama; Saki Fukuda
- Cinematography: Shigetomo Madarame
- Edited by: Masahiro Ōno
- Music by: Keiichirō Shibuya; Gabriele Roberto
- Distributed by: Toho
- Release date: April 7, 2012 (Japan)
- Running time: 119 minutes
- Country: Japan
- Language: Japanese
- Box office: ¥2.39 billion (US$24 million)

SPEC: Ten (Japanese: 劇場版 ＳＰＥＣ～天～), also known as SPEC: Heaven, is a 2012 Japanese film directed by Yukihiko Tsutsumi. It was released on 7 April 2012. This is a sequel to the TBS SPEC drama series.

== Cast ==
- Erika Toda as Saya Tōma
- Ryo Kase as Takeru Sebumi
- Chiaki Kuriyama as Satoko Aoike
- Kasumi Arimura as Miyabi Masaki
- Denden as Kenzō Ichiyanagi
- Yuko Asano as Madam Yang/Madam Yin
- Ryūnosuke Kamiki as Jūichi Ninomae
- Saki Fukuda as Mirei Shimura
- Kippei Shiina as Sukehiro Tsuda

== Reception ==
According to the box-office report by The Motion Picture Producers Association of Japan, the film had grossed ¥2.39 billion (US$24 million).
