= Fujibayashi Nagato-no-kami =

Japanese Samurai and Ninja

- 藤林 長門守
- Born: Unknown
- Died: Unknown
- Burial place: Shōkaku-ji Temple
- Other name: Yasutoyo (保豊)
- Children: Fujibayashi Yasumasa (son)
- Relatives: 1 sister (concubine of Rokkaku Yoshikata)
- Military career
- Era: Sengoku period
- Rank: Nagato no Kami (長門守)

Fujibayashi Nagato-no-kami (Japanese: 藤林 長門守) was a samurai and ninja operative during Japan's Sengoku period. His birth and death dates remain unknown. His real name is believed to have been Yasutoyo (保豊).

== Biography ==
Fujibayashi hailed from Yufune village in Ahaigun, northern Iga Province—now Higashi-Yufune in Iga, Mie—which bordered Kōka District in Ōmi Province. There are various theories about his real name, including Masayasu and Yasutoyo. He controlled Yufune-go (Ueno City, Mie Prefecture), which located in the northern part of Iga Province, and had authority over the ninjas from Kōka District, Shiga.

Initially, he served Imagawa Yoshimoto in Suruga Province, residing in Sunpu (modern-day Shizuoka). During this time, he is believed to have developed a friendship with Yamamoto Kansuke prior to Kansuke's service under Takeda Shingen, and may have learned military strategy from him. Following internal turmoil in Iga, he resigned and returned home.

Fujibayashi maintained close ties with the Rokkaku clan due to his sister's relationship with Rokkaku Yoshikata. During the Eiroku era, when Yoshikata faced difficulties capturing Sawayama Castle from the rebelling Dodo clan, he requested help from Fujibayashi. In response, Iga ninja under Tateoka Dōjun were dispatched, contributing to the Rokkaku victory.

His later activities are largely unknown. By the time of the Tenshō Iga War, his son Fujibayashi Yasumasa had succeeded him. After the defeat, Nagato is said to have survived the Second Tensho Iga War in 1581 by siding with Nobunaga, but the details are unknown.

The Fujibayashi clan fled and sought protection under the Tokugawa clan. The family later returned to Yufune and entered the service of the Tōdō clan of the Tsu Domain.

A descendant, Fujibayashi Yasutake, authored the famous ninja manual Bansenshūkai—an essential record of Iga and Kōka ninja traditions.

== Legacy ==
His descendant, Fujibayashi Yasutake, has written Bansenshukai, A manual of Ninjitsu, in 1676 during the early years of Tokugawa Shogunate.

Remains of Fujibayashi Nagato former fortress in Ahaigun still exist in the 20th century.

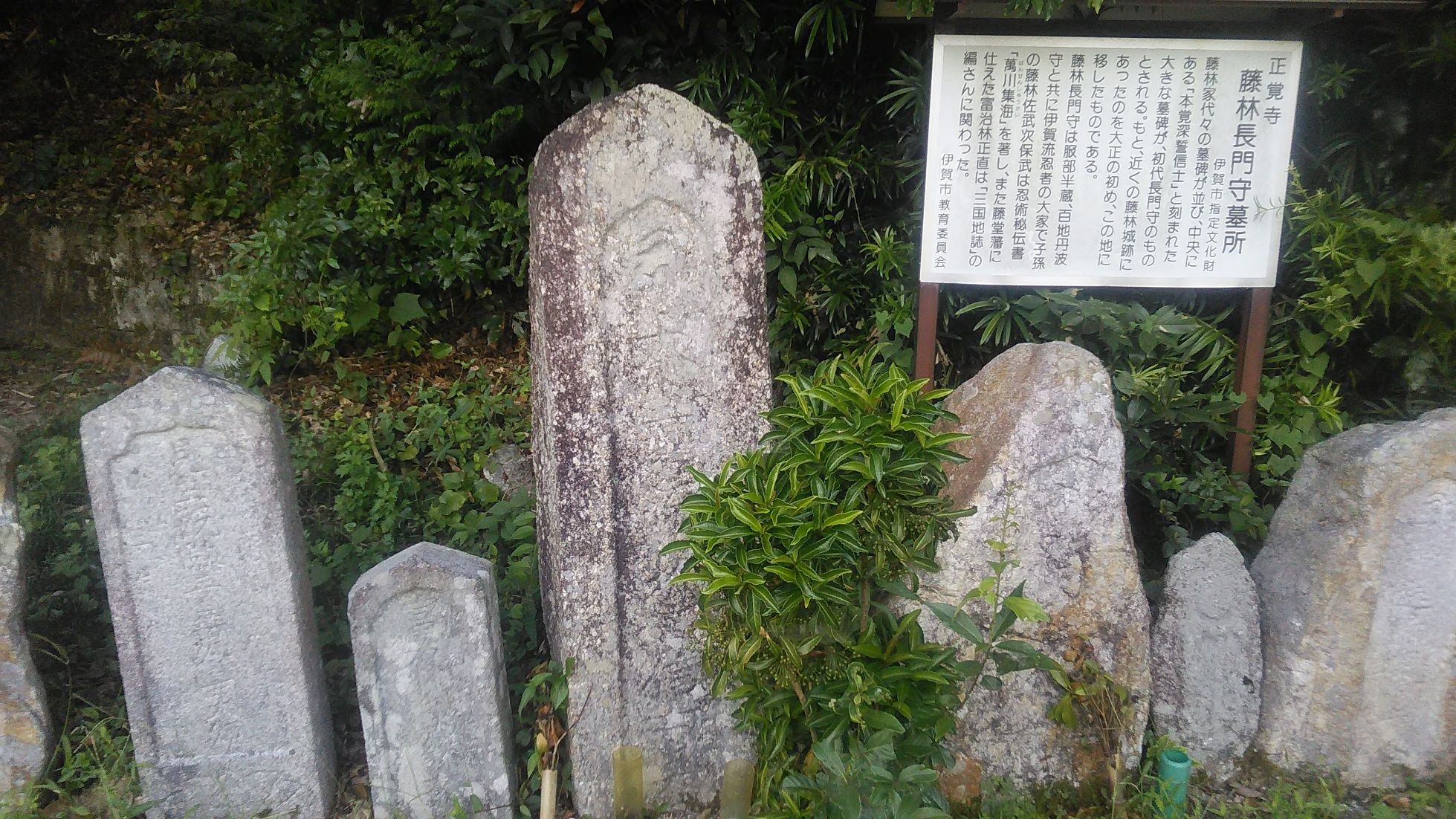
Grave of Fujibayashi Nagatonokami at Shōkaku-ji, Iga

His grave, believed to be that of the Fujibayashi family, was relocated from the ruins of his former castle to Shōkaku-ji in Higashi-Yufune, Iga. It is now designated a municipal historic site.

== In popular culture ==
=== Film ===
- Shinobi no Mono (1962), portrayed by Yūnosuke Itō
- Daininjutsu Eiga Watari (1966), portrayed by Tetsurō Tamba

=== Literature ===
- Oda Nobunaga to Iwamuro Nagatonokami (2016), by Kusunoki Kodama, Seishinsha

=== Manga ===
- Nobunaga no Shinobi
- Assassin's Creed Shadows: Iga no Monogatari (2025)

=== Video games ===
- Assassin's Creed Shadows (2025), portrayed by Peter Shinkoda

== Bibliography ==
- Maekawa, Tomohide (2019), "藤堂藩伊賀者の系譜『冨治林家由緒書』をひもとく", 伊賀百筆 (in Japanese), vol. 29, Iga Hyakuhitsu Editorial Committee
- Hiramatsu, Reizō, ed. (1983), Japanese Historical Place Names Database (in Japanese), vol. 24, Heibonsha, ISBN 9784582910391
- Shibata, Minoru, ed. (1991), Japanese Historical Place Names Database (in Japanese), vol. 25, Heibonsha, ISBN 9784582910117
- Watanabe, Ichirō. 萬川集海. Encyclopedia Nipponica (in Japanese). Shogakukan.
