= Natori Masatake =

Natori Sanjurō Masatake (died c. 1708) was a samurai and an exponent of ninjutsu. He is most noted for having written the Shōninki, a ninja training manual, and for founding the Kishū-Ryū school of martial arts.

== Biography ==
Natori was a samurai of the Kii branch of the Tokugawa clan, a house which was directly related to the shōgun. His family joined the clan in 1654, and his father, Natori Masatomi, served under Tokugawa Yorinobu as the head of undercover military operations. Masatake was originally employed as a page, but on reaching adulthood became a foot soldier for the clan. His elder brother inherited his father's position, but despite this Masatake rose through the ranks to the position of ogaban, a senior retainer. He published the Shōninki in 1681.

In this work, he set down his thoughts on the role and techniques of the ninja, and the teachings of his family's military arts, focusing primarily on moral character.

== Aliases ==
Natori went by a number of names during his life, including Natori Masazumi, Fujinosshuishi Masatake and Fujibayashi Masatake.

== Reported time of death ==
His date of death is uncertain, but has been given in some sources as 1708.
