= Iga Ueno Ninja Festa =

Iga Ueno NINJA Festa (Japanese: 伊賀上野 NINJA フェスタ) is the annual five-week ninja-themed festival in the Japanese city of Iga (in the former province of Iga), from April 1 to May 6. Tens of thousands of ninja fans travel to Iga for ninja-inspired performances, competitions, and opportunities to practice ninja skills, organized to promote the city. During the family-friendly festival, passengers on Iga train lines dressed in ninja costumes are given free rides. Since 2001, the mayor of Iga and the city council also hold an annual session while dressed up as ninja, called the Ninja Congress (忍者議会).

== See also ==
- Iga-ryū
- Iga ikki
- Iga-ryū Ninja Museum
