= Umemura =

Umemura (written: 梅村) is a Japanese surname. Notable people with the surname include:

- Aya Umemura (梅村 礼; born 1976), Japanese table tennis player
- Hiroshi Umemura (fighter) (梅村 寛; born 1972), Japanese mixed martial artist
- Hiroshi Umemura (mathematician) (梅村 浩; born 1944), Japanese mathematician and professor
- Mizuho Umemura (梅村 みずほ; born 1978), Japanese politician
- Satoshi Umemura (梅村 聡; born 1975), Japanese politician
- Umemura Sawano (梅村 澤野), Japanese kunoichi
