= Jin'ichi =

- Gender: Male

Origin
- Origin: Japanese
- Meaning: Different meanings depending on the kanji used

Jin'ichi or Jinichi (written: 任一 or 仁一) is a masculine Japanese given name. Notable people with the name include

- Jinichi Kawakami (川上 仁一) (born 1949), Japanese academic and ninjutsu practitioner
- Jinichi Kusaka (草鹿 任一) (1888–1972), Imperial Japanese Navy admiral
