= Kunoichi =

Female ninja

Kunoichi (Japanese: くノ一, also くのいち or クノイチ) is a Japanese term for "woman" (女, onna). In popular culture, it is often used for female ninja or practitioners of ninjutsu (ninpo). The term was largely popularized by novelist Futaro Yamada in his novel Ninpō Hakkenden (忍法八犬伝) in 1964.

Although kunoichi have appeared in numerous creative works, including novels, TV dramas, movies, and manga, Mie University historians have concluded that there are no historical records of female ninja performing reconnaissance and subversive activities in the same manner as their male counterparts. However, the late 17th century ninja handbook Bansenshūkai describes a technique called "the ninjutsu of a kunoichi" (くノ一の術), in which a woman is used for infiltration and information-gathering, which Seiko Fujita considered evidence of female ninja activity.

== Etymology ==
女 being made up from くノ一

The term is thought to derive from the names of characters that resemble the three strokes in the Japanese kanji character for "woman" (女, onna) in the following stroke order:

- "く" is a hiragana character pronounced "ku"
- "ノ" is a katakana character pronounced "no"
- "一" is a kanji character pronounced "ichi" (and meaning "one").

The word "kunoichi" was not used frequently in the Edo period. This is probably because in this era, the kanji letter "女" was not written in regular script but usually in cursive script, and the cursive script of "女" cannot be decomposed into "く", "ノ", and "一".

== History of use ==
Recent research by Mie University historians Yūji Yamada, Katsuya Yoshimaru, and others indicates that there are no historical records of the existence of female ninja who conducted reconnaissance and subversive activities in the same manner as their male counterparts. According to Yoshimaru, kunoichi came to mean "female ninja" in the creative works largely due to the influence of Futaro Yamada's Ninpōchō series. During the Edo period, kunoichi was used as a cant term to refer to a woman and had no meaning for a female ninja. However, the term has very few examples of usage, most likely because the writing style at the time was not composed of the three strokes attributed to kunoichi.

The eighth volume of the ninja handbook Bansenshukai written in 1676 describes Kunoichi-no-jutsu (くノ一の術, the ninjutsu of a woman), which can be interpreted as "a technique to utilize a woman". The Bansenshukai compiles the knowledge of the ninja clans in the regions of Iga and Kōka. According to this document, the main function of the kunoichi was espionage, finding functions in enemy house services, to gather knowledge, gain trust or listen to conversations. This "technique to utilize a woman" was employed for infiltration purposes when it was difficult for a man to infiltrate. There is a technique in which a kunoichi uses a double-bottomed wooden chest to infiltrate a person into a building by telling the wife of the house that she is retrieving a wooden chest. Both of these techniques however are described as "techniques through the usage of a woman", and while Seiko Fujita considers these techniques to be evidence of female ninja, Yoshimaru and Yamada consider 'female ninja' not to have existed as such.

Another early mention of kunoichi exists in the poem compilation Enshūsenkuzuke by Waki Enshū from 1680, and was used to refer to Sei Shōnagon, a female poet.

Iga FC Kunoichi, a women's football club which is based in the city of Iga, takes its name from the term.

== See also ==
- Onna-musha, female warriors in feudal Japan
- Umemura Sawano, an alleged 16th–17th century female ninja
- Mochizuki Chiyome, an alleged 16th-century female ninja in the service of Takeda Shingen.
- Hatsume no Tsubone, a legendary female ninja
- Tsunade, a fictional female ninja from the folktale Jiraiya Gōketsu Monogatari
