= Modern schools of ninjutsu =

Modern schools of ninjutsu are schools which offer instruction in martial arts. To a larger or smaller degree, the curriculum is derived from the practice of ninjutsu, the arts of the Shinobi; covert agents of feudal Japan.

One of the earliest modern schools to be established was the Bujinkan Organization in 1972 by martial artist Masaaki Hatsumi. The organization teaches nine different martial arts styles, three of which are named after and claim to be descended from historical ninjutsu styles. Stephen K. Hayes, an early student of Shoto Tanemura and later Hatsumi, took what he learned to the United States in the 1970s, starting his own group of organizations called Quest Centers and his own martial arts style, To-Shin Do. Several other schools of ninjutsu were also created during the 1970s, including the fraudulent so-called "Dux-Ryu" Ninjutsu school in 1975 and the Nindo Ryu Bujutsu Kai federation in 1979.

During the 1980s, several other schools of ninjutsu also began to be developed across the world, with the Genbukan being founded in 1984 in Japan by Shoto Tanemura, a former friend and student of Hatsumi, and the AKBAN school being developed in Israel in 1986 by Doron Navon's student, Yossi Sherriff, as an offshoot of the Bujinkan Organization. The Banke Shinobinoden school, which claims to have a long history, began teaching Koga and Iga ninjutsu more popularly with the opening of the Iga-ryū Ninja Museum by Jinichi Kawakami, and the Kuroryukan school, founded in 2004 by Nuno Santos, teaching Iga and Koga Ryu Ninjutsu.

The historical claims of some of these modern schools have been questioned with regard to whether they truly qualify as Koryū.

== 1970s ==
=== Bujinkan ===
In 1972, Masaaki Hatsumi founded the Bujinkan organization. It uses the concepts of Ninjutsu in three of its nine schools though they have since steered away from the "Ninjutsu" moniker in order to avoid stereotypes and since the art, which contains 9 ryūha (or schools), only has 3 schools based on the ninja while the other 6 are based on samurai tactics.

=== Shadows of Iga Society ===
Stephen K. Hayes founded the "Shadows of Iga Society" in order to promote ninjutsu studies in North America. He studied with Shoto Tanemura and then with Masaaki Hatsumi. Hayes introduced the concepts of ninjutsu to North America. He founded a ninjutsu dojo in the mid-1970s, in Atlanta, Georgia. In about 1980, Hayes moved to Dayton, Ohio where he continued to teach.

=== Nindo Ryu Bujutsu Kai ===
The "Nindo Ryu Bujutsu Kai" is a martial arts federation founded in 1979. It has a gendai ninjutsu division under the direction of Carlos R. Febres. Febres was a former student of Shoto Tanemura and T. Higushi and studies with of Ron Duncan and Bo Munthe. "Nindo Ryu Gendai Ninjutsu" uses modern application and interpretation of the "Takamatsuden, Koga (koka) & eclectic schools of ninjutsu.

== 1980s ==
During the 1980s, several schools of ninjutsu were developed both in and outside Japan.Such as in 1986, in Israel, Yossi Sheriff founded Akban. The school's curriculum is based on that which was taught to Doron Navon (Sheriff's teacher). Navon was the first foreign Bujinkan shihan. He studied with Tanemura and then with Hatsumi.

=== Genbukan organization ===
"Genbukan" (玄武館) was founded in 1984 by Soke "Shoto" Tanemura. Tanemura initially studied under Masaaki Hatsumi and then sought out all the remaining students of Takamatsu (Kimura Masaji, Sato Kinbei, Fukumoto Yoshio, Matoyoshi Nakayama) as well as their successors (Kobayashi, Ueno Takashi's personal student), (Akimoto Koki) and others. He was also the Vice President of the Bujinkan Shidoshi Association. (Tanemura left Hatsumi's tutelage after a disagreement). The Genbukan organization includes over 100 dojos in approximately 30 countries and 20 states in the USA. The organization, Genbukan Ninpo Bugei (玄武館忍法武芸) has 36 divisions called "ninja sanjurokkei". The schools teach taijutsu, bikenjutsu and keishinteki kyoyo as well as bō jutsu, yumi, naginata, yari, jutte, kusari-gama, and shuriken. The Kokusai Jujutsu Renmei (international organization) also teaches traditional Japanese Jujutsu techniques. and self-defense techniques such as goshinjutsu, 'koryu karate' and 'Chugoku Kenpo'. It should be noted however, that neither Bujinkan nor Genbukan should be considered true Koryū, mostly due to the inability to prove their lineage to pre-Meiji restoration, as many documents were embellished to make them appear older than they really are. There is also some criticism that both Hatsumi and Tanemura run respective organizations with profit as their prime interest.

=== Akban ===
In 1986, in Israel, Yossi Sheriff founded Akban. The school's curriculum is based on that which was taught to Doron Navon (Sheriff's teacher). Navon was the first foreign Bujinkan shihan. He studied with Tanemura and then with Hatsumi.

=== Banke Shinobinoden ===
The Banke Shinobinoden school began teaching koga and iga ninjutsu when these martial arts became more popular after the opening of the Iga-ryū Ninja Museum.

== 1990 to present ==
=== Quest Centers ===
In the 1997 Stephen K. Hayes retired the Shadows of Iga society, and founded the "Quest Centers". Hayes developed To-Shin Do, a western system of Ninjutsu distinct from Bujinkan.

=== Jinkage-Ryū Ninpō Bugei ===
The Jinkage-Ryū Ninpō Bugei school was founded by Roger J Small in or around 1993. The school teaches a modern format of Ninjutsu which addresses all areas of self-protection and unique survival tactics for the 21st century. Roger Small has over 45 years experience in the art of ninjutsu, and many years of experience in far eastern fighting arts. The Jinkage-Ryū Ninpō Bugei school is a modern derivative of traditional ninjutsu adapted for the 21st century..

=== Hosho Ryu Ninpo ===
Hoshō Ryū Ninpō (歩 哨 流 忍 法) or Hoshō (歩 哨) is a Ninja school (忍者) founded by Shihan Cícero Melo on 10.01.1998 in the Mooca neighborhood in the city of São Paulo where Honbu Dōjō (本部 道場) is located. The school follows traditional Japanese standards with an important technical, cultural and philosophical deepening of the Shinobi Art (忍 び). It has as study, the development of Ninjutsu (忍術), Bujutsu (武術), Ninpo Kenjutsu (忍 法 剣 術) and Goshinjutsu (護身 術) in all its dimensions. One unique aspect of this school is the use of straight-blade swords rather than more-traditional curved swords. In the world of martial arts, few names resonate with as much authority and respect as Shihan Cícero Melo. Recognized as one of the leading figures in Ninjutsu in Brazil, his career is a testament to dedication, knowledge, and leadership.

=== Jissen Kobudo Jinenkan ===
This school was founded by Fumio "Unsui" Manaka in 1996. Manaka was a personal student of Masaaki Hatsumi and achieved "Menkyo Kaiden" in several styles of Bujinkan Budo Taijutsu; including togakure-ryu ninjutsu.

=== Kage No Michi Ninjutsu ===
Kage No Michi Ninjutsu, which translates into The Way of the Shadow Ninjutsu, is a modern derivative of traditional ninjutsu. This style was founded by Tafan Hong in 2005 who holds rank of Shodan in the traditional Bujinkan Ninjutsu System.

=== Kage No Shinobu Shakai ===
The Shadow Shinobi Society is an American organization located in the northwestern region of the United States. Founded by a group of Military Veterans with backgrounds in various martial arts in 2006. Ninjutsu became the main focus of study along with survival training. The society provides qualifications in Ninjutsu and firearms along with Private Security services (Shinobi Security), then Body Guard and Bounty Hunter training for members.

=== Shisenkan ===
Shisenkan means Hall of the Mystic Warrior. This reflects the two paths of the warriors that created the Takamstsu Den Ryu ha, that of Bun 文, learning, and Bu 武, fighting. Throughout Japanese history, many famous warriors have adopted this bunbu-no-michi 文武の道, often referred to as the "Way of the Brush and Sword."

Started in 2023 by Ron Kosen.

== Controversy and opposition ==
Concerns about modern schools of ninjutsu relate to the schools' claims to authenticity (direct lines of tutelage from the ancient schools) and secondly, to claims of notability by those who operate them. For example, some ask whether modern schools of ninjutsu qualify as "Koryū".

The concerns about authenticity are voiced by historians of koryu arts and by representatives of the Iga Ninja Museum of Japan. Some have suggested there are no longer any true ninjutsu schools.

=== Controversial figures in modern ninjutsu ===
==== Masaaki Hatsumi ====
In August 1960, Masaaki Hatsumi stated that he had studied under Takashi Ueno from the age of 24 to 29. Hatsumi also said that he sometimes wrote letters to Ueno's teacher, Toshitsugu Takamatsu. However, the certificate which Takamatsu gave to Hatsumi, that named Hatsumi as the 34th Grand master of "Togakure ryu Ninjutsu tradition" is dated March 1958 and furthermore, there is no documentation or evidence referring to the previous 33 holders of this title. There is however, old footage by way of black and white films of Hatsumi and Takamatsu training together over a period of several years. Takamatsu confirmed that Hatsumi had only been training with him since 1958. In November 1963, Hatsumi said that he was training with Takamatsu sensei once every three months, but only on weekends. Kiyoshi Watatani (editor of the Bugeicyo magazine in 1963), suggested that Masaaki Hatsumi's lineage was not consistent with his claims, and therefore these claims were Hatsumi's notion alone and that he had no proof to back up these claims. A source regarding the history of ninjutsu is the Kakutogi No Rekishi (which lists the Bujinkan Ryuha - Hatsumi's organization) and also mentions the close personal friend of Hatsumi, Yumio Nawa. In 1972, Nawa confirmed the historical status of the 12th century tradition of the togakure ryu. In 1978, the Bugei Ryūha Daijiten said of the Takamatsu Togakure-ryu,

"The genealogy of the Togakure-ryu includes embellishments, to the written traditions and documentation of the school which would suggest that these embellishments were created in order for the tradition to appear older than it actually is." (The 1963 and 1969 versions of the Bugei include similar wording).

In Shinobi no sengokushi (August, 2004) Hatsumi said that he had trained under Toshitsugu Takamatsu's tutelage for 15 years and had become a master of 9 individual traditional Japanese schools/systems at the age 27. In the past, Masaaki Hatsumi had elected not to pass the system on to an heir, but has recently passed down sokeship of Togakure ryu to actor Takumi Tsutsui in 2020.

==== Jinichi Kawakami ====
The founder of Banke Shinobinoden school, Jinichi Kawakami, studied with Masazo Ishida. Thomas Dillon wrote,

"No one knows anything about Ishida and therefore there is no evidence that Kawakami's claims are correct. How very ninja-like."

Jinichi Kawakami is supposedly the 21st Grand Master (Soke) of the "Koga Ban" clan, and the honorary director of the Iga-ryu Ninja Museum. Kawakami runs a dojo in Sagamihara-shi, Kanagawa Prefecture, but no longer accepts new students. Kawakami's student, Yasushi Kiyomoto, is also a teacher of this school.

==== Frank Dux ====
The validity of Dux's claims which have been disputed include his martial arts credentials; his fighting in the "Kumite"; and his prior military service. In 1998, in the Los Angeles superior court, Dux and Jean-Claude Van Damme were opposing litigants. In 2004, Ralph Keyes (writer for the LA Times) wrote,

"Like Wayland Clifton, Dux even forged a press account of his exploits. Research on these 'exploits' conducted by Los Angeles Times reporter, John Johnson, and phony-veteran unmasker, B.G. 'Jug' Burkett, revealed that Dux had been in the military for only a few months, didn't serve in Southeast Asia, and won no medals. His service record indicates that Dux had been referred for psychiatric evaluation due to 'flights of ideas and exaggerations."

==== Ashida Kim ====
Born Radford William Davis in 1948, Ashida Kim is the author of a number of books about Ninjutsu including Secrets of the Ninja. No evidence is available recording where Ashida Kim's training took place, or who trained him. Demonstrating his martial arts knowledge in a video interview released on YouTube, Kim says that the first five forms learned in Goju Ryu, Shotokan, Wado Ryu, Isshin Ryu, and "hard Korean martial arts" are all identical. In 2003, Kim stated in an interview with The Believer magazine, that he has been associated with the "Black Dragon Fighting Society" (BDFS) since meeting its head, Count Dante, in 1968. In the same article, he indicates that the BDFS is descended from a 6,000-year-old Chinese school called the "Polestar school" which has been preserving knowledge since the fall of Atlantis. In 2005, Kim's websites were temporarily suspended due to a copyright claim by William V. Aguiar III, leader of the BDFS. Aguiar claimed ownership of the BDFS trademarks and copyrights inherited after Dante's death. The claim was later dismissed and Kim's websites were restored.
