= Jinichi Kawakami =

Japanese ninjutsu practitioner

Jinichi Kawakami (川上仁一) b. 1949, head of Banke Shinobinoden, is the last sōke and only heir to authentic ninjutsu. He says he is the 21st head of the Koga Ban family (Iga and Koga Ninjutsu), a mercenary, and the honorary director of the Iga-ryu Ninja Museum. In 2011, he was specially appointed a professor at Mie University to research ninjutsu at the university's research cooperation center..

Kawakami is not of a ninja bloodline of his own, but says he learned his art as a boy from a man named Masado (Masazo) Ishida, a medicine peddler claiming to be one of the last remaining ninjutsu practitioners alive. According to Japan Times, "Kawakami has something most other ninja claimants do not — an earnest combination of humility and scholarship. Not to mention some highly polished martial arts skills of his own." He is also a former trained engineer.

His top student, Yasushi Kiyomoto, is the only one teaching from the Banke Shinobinoden group. Kiyomoto operates a dojo in Sagamihara-shi, Kanagawa Prefecture, but he no longer takes on new students.

In 2012, Kawakami decided that he will not appoint anyone to take over as the next ninja grandmaster. He told BBC News: "In the age of civil wars or during the Edo period, ninjas' abilities to spy and kill, or mix medicine may have been useful. But we now have guns, the internet and much better medicines, so the art of ninjutsu has no place in the modern age."
