= Mount Abura =

Mountain in the country of Japan

Coordinates: 33°30′43″N 130°21′52″E

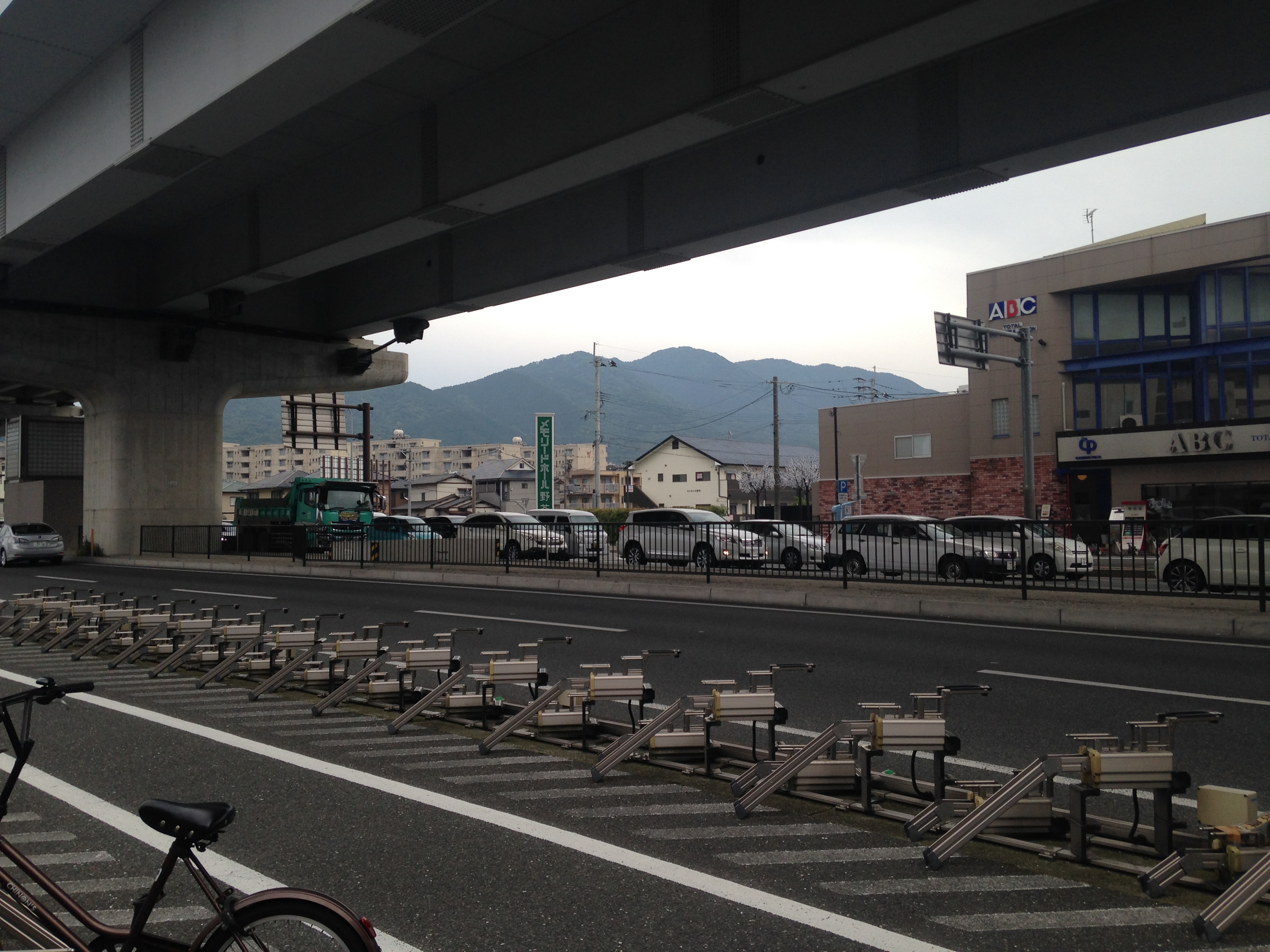
A view of Mount Abura from near Subway Noke Station.

Mount Abura (油山, Abura-yama) is a 597 m (1,959 ft) mountain located on the border of Minami-ku, Fukuoka, Sawara-ku, Fukuoka and Jonan-ku, Fukuoka, Fukuoka Prefecture, Japan. Mount Abura is the location where the Indian Buddhist priest Seiga produced the first camellia oil from seeds made in Japan during the Nara period. Abura means oil in Japanese.

The Aburayama Incident occurred on August 10, 1945 in a wooded area near the municipal crematory when the Imperial Japanese Army executed and beheaded a total of eight US Army prisoners who were crew members of a Boeing B-29 aircraft. After World War II, Genzō Abe, the 24th mayor of Fukuoka, built a memorial at the site. In addition, all the personnel who were involved in the incident were charged with conventional war crimes in separate trials convened by the Tokyo War Crimes Tribunal.

The mountain is easily accessible from downtown by car and is loved by local people as a relaxation spot.

== Facilities ==
- Mōmōland Aburayama farm
- Aburayama citizens forest
- Aburayama Kannon Shōkaku-ji

== Routes ==
The most popular route to climb this mountain is from Aburayama Denchi Guchi Bus Stop of Nishitetsu Bus. It takes about one hour to the top. Extra bus services from Fukudaimae Station on Subway Nanakuma Line are available on Sundays and public holidays between March and November.

== Gallery ==
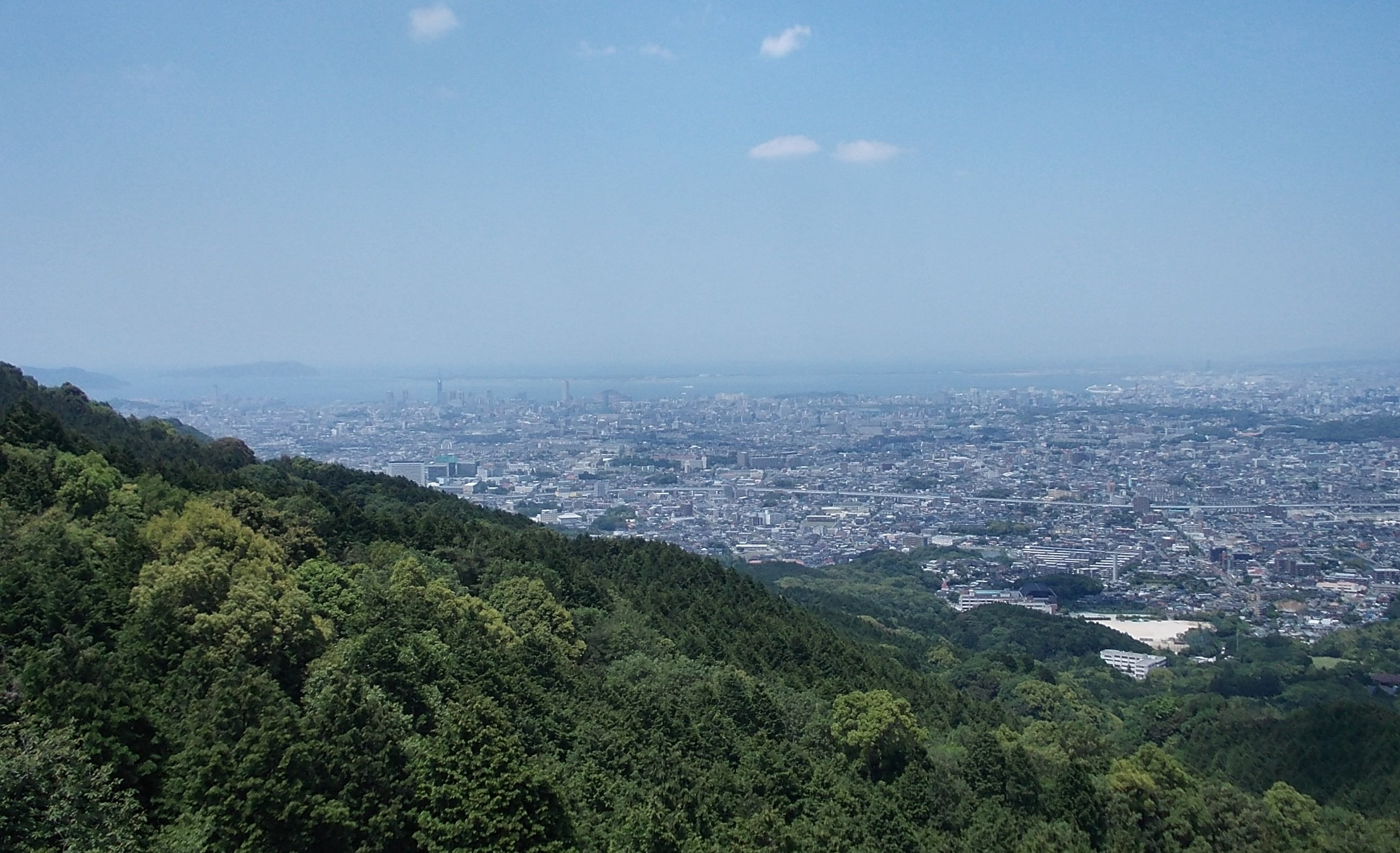
A view of Fukuoka city from Katae Observation deck

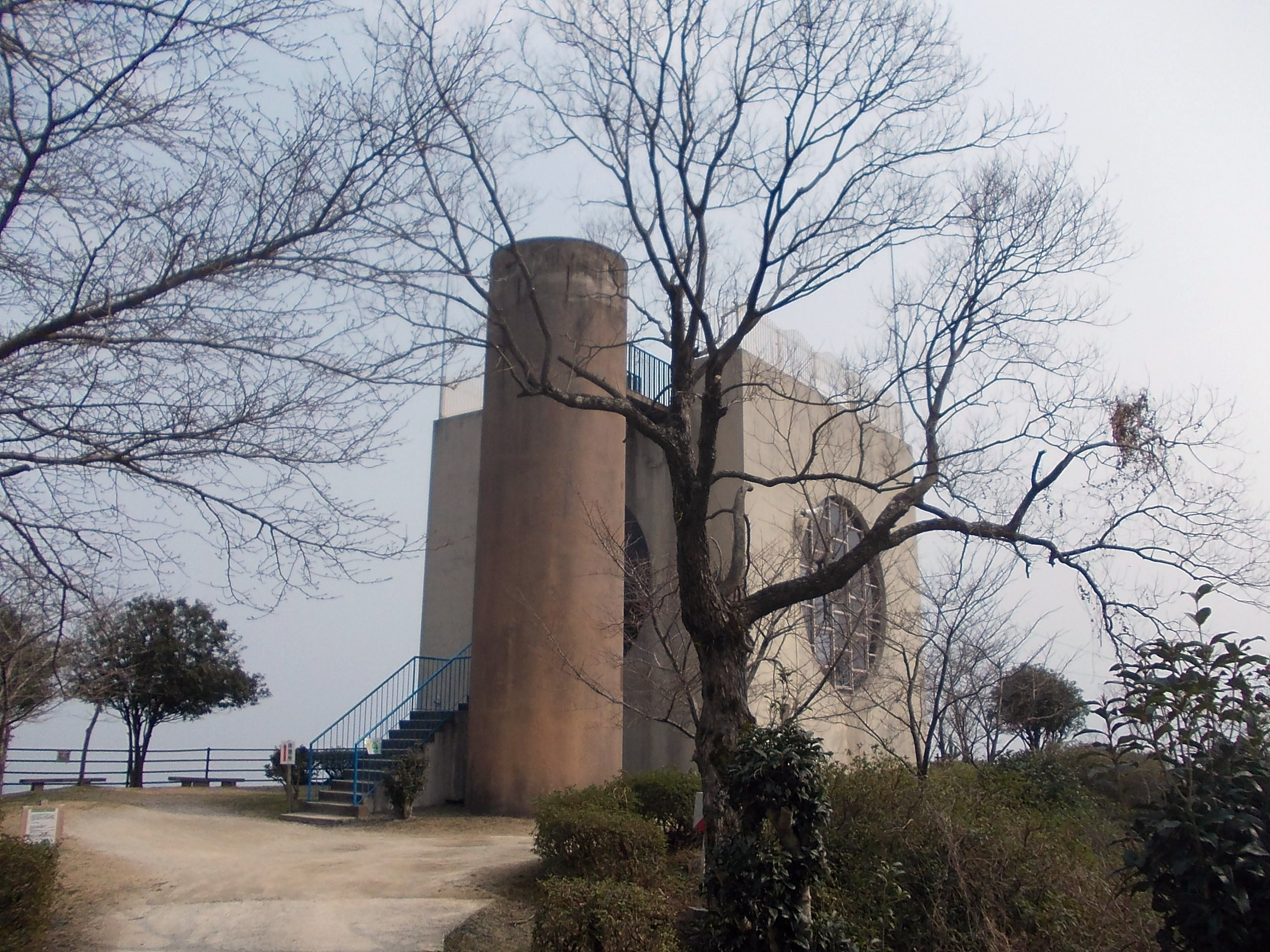
Katae Observation deck

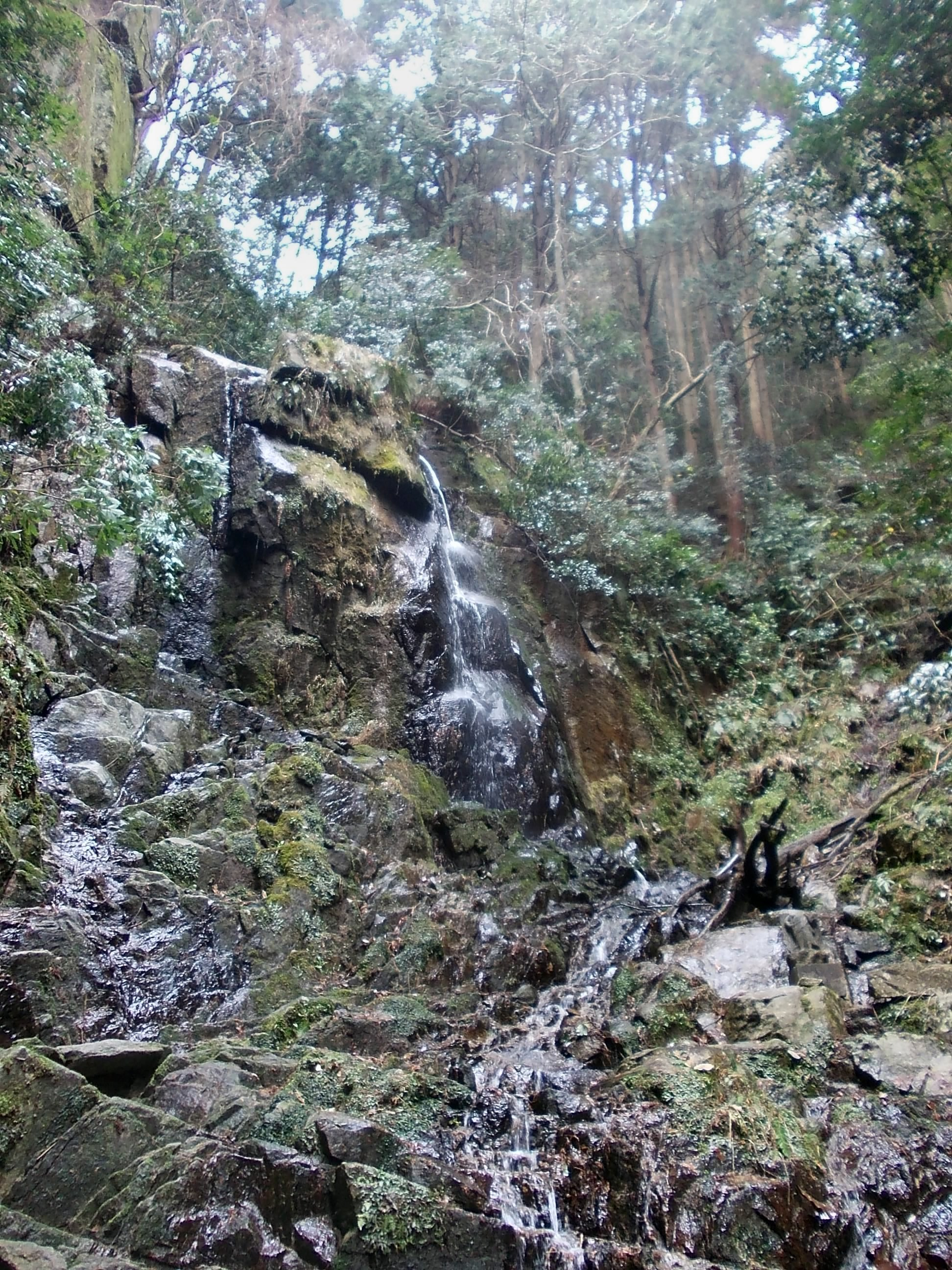
Yamakasa Falls in Aburayama citizens forest

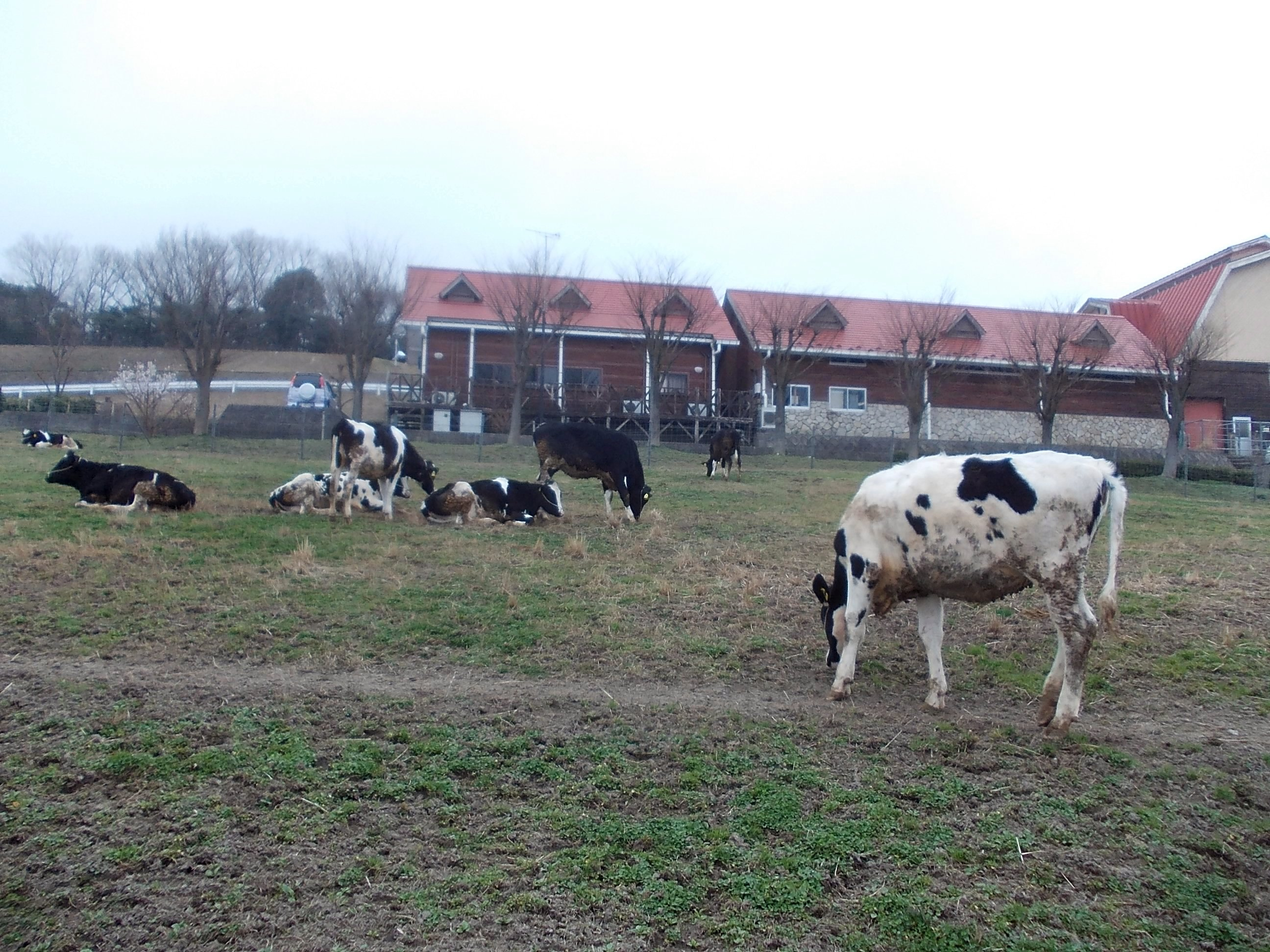
Mōmōland Aburayama farm

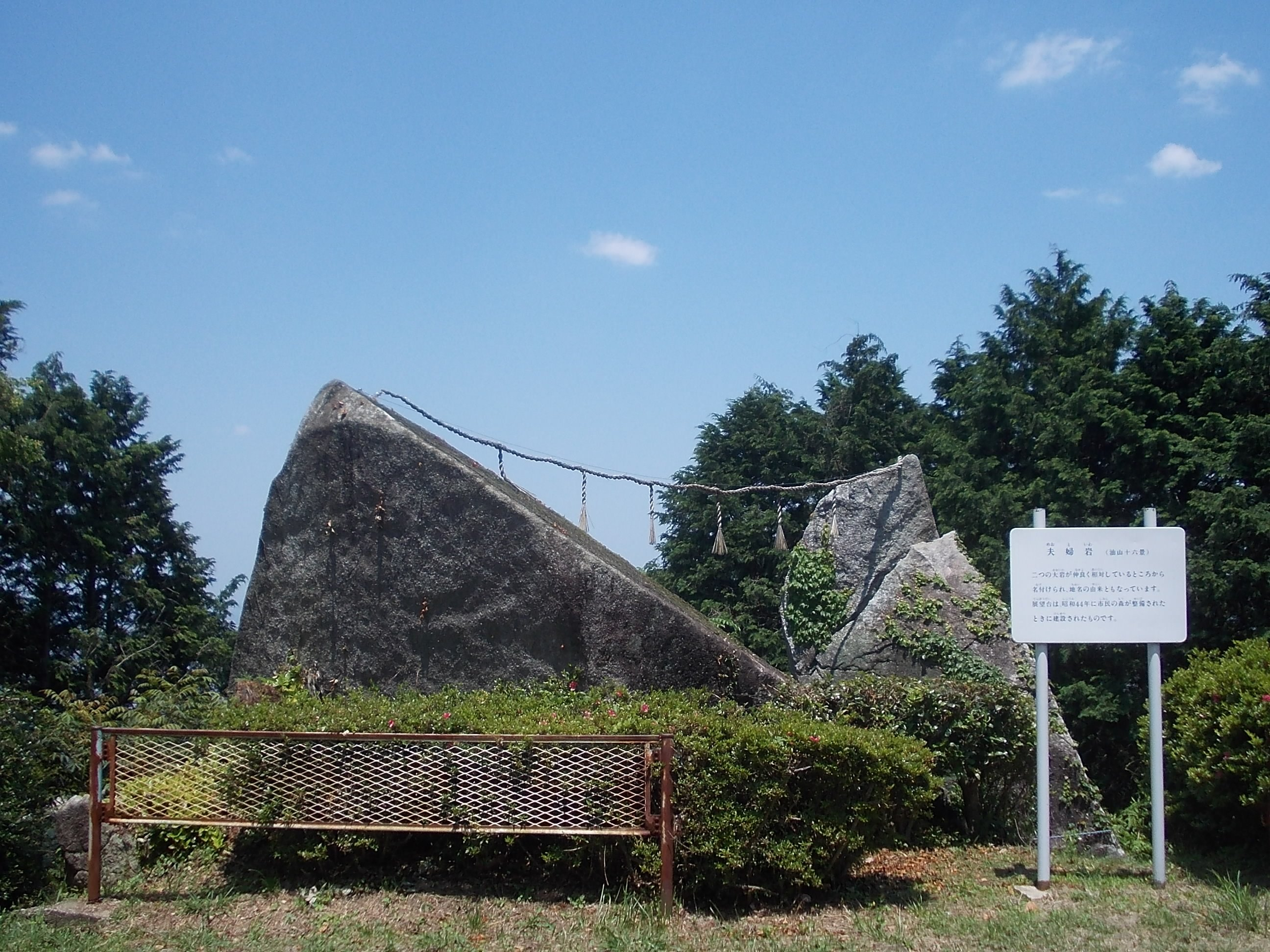
Meoto-iwa Rocks in Aburayama citizens forest

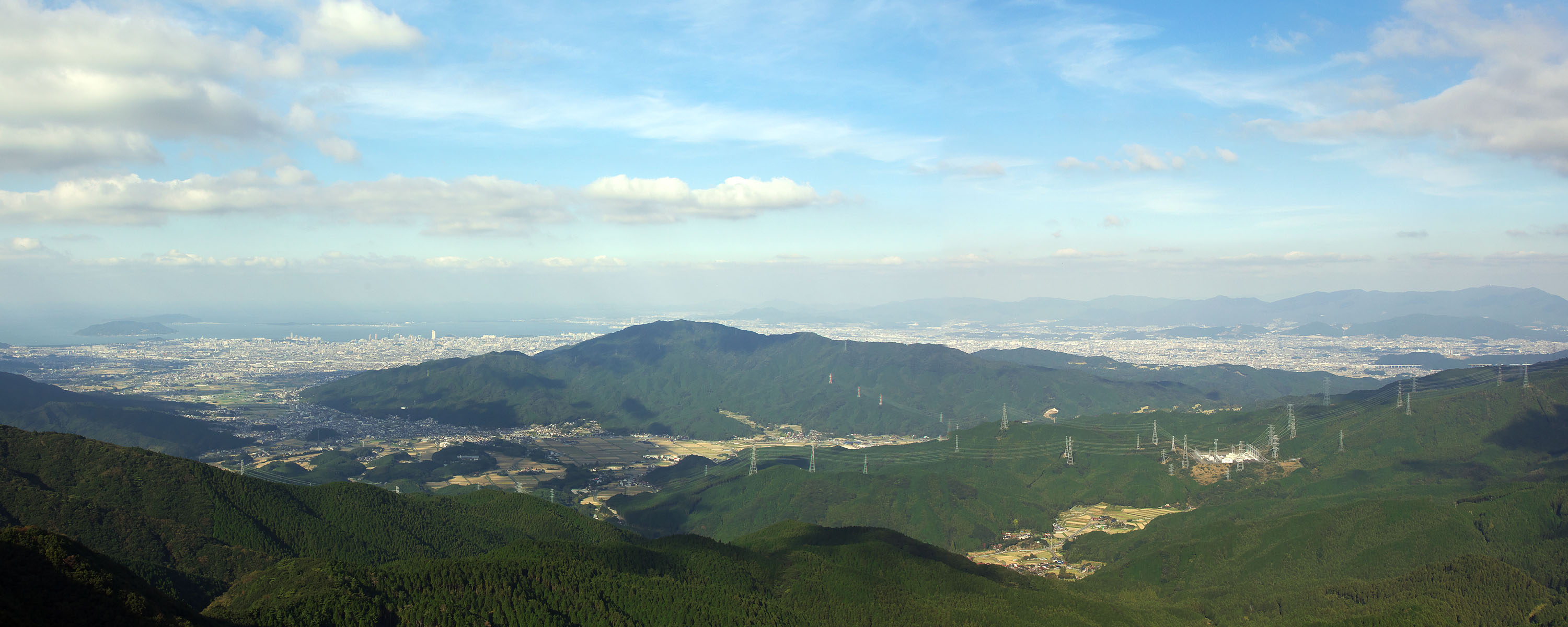
A distant view of Mount Abura from Tōjin-no-mai rock observation deck in Mount Sefuri
