= Ninpiden =

1560 ninjutsu manual by Hattori Hanzō

The Ninpiden (a.k.a. Shinobi Hiden, or Legends of Ninja Secrets) is an authentic ninjutsu manual purporting to have been written by a member of the Hattori Hanzō clan in 1560 (though more likely it was composed in the early 1700s, the earliest manuscript we have being dated 1731). It is regarded as one of the three key historical texts of ninjutsu, along with the Shōninki and the Bansenshukai. It is supposed to have been passed down in the Hattori family, and have been considered a secret transmission not shared with outsiders and even within the family, few had access to it.

== Bibliography ==
- Antony Cummins & Yoshie Minami, eds. & trans. The Secret Traditions of the Shinobi: Hattori Hanzo's Shinobi Hiden and Other Ninja Scrolls. Berkeley, Calif.: Blue Snake Books, 2012.
