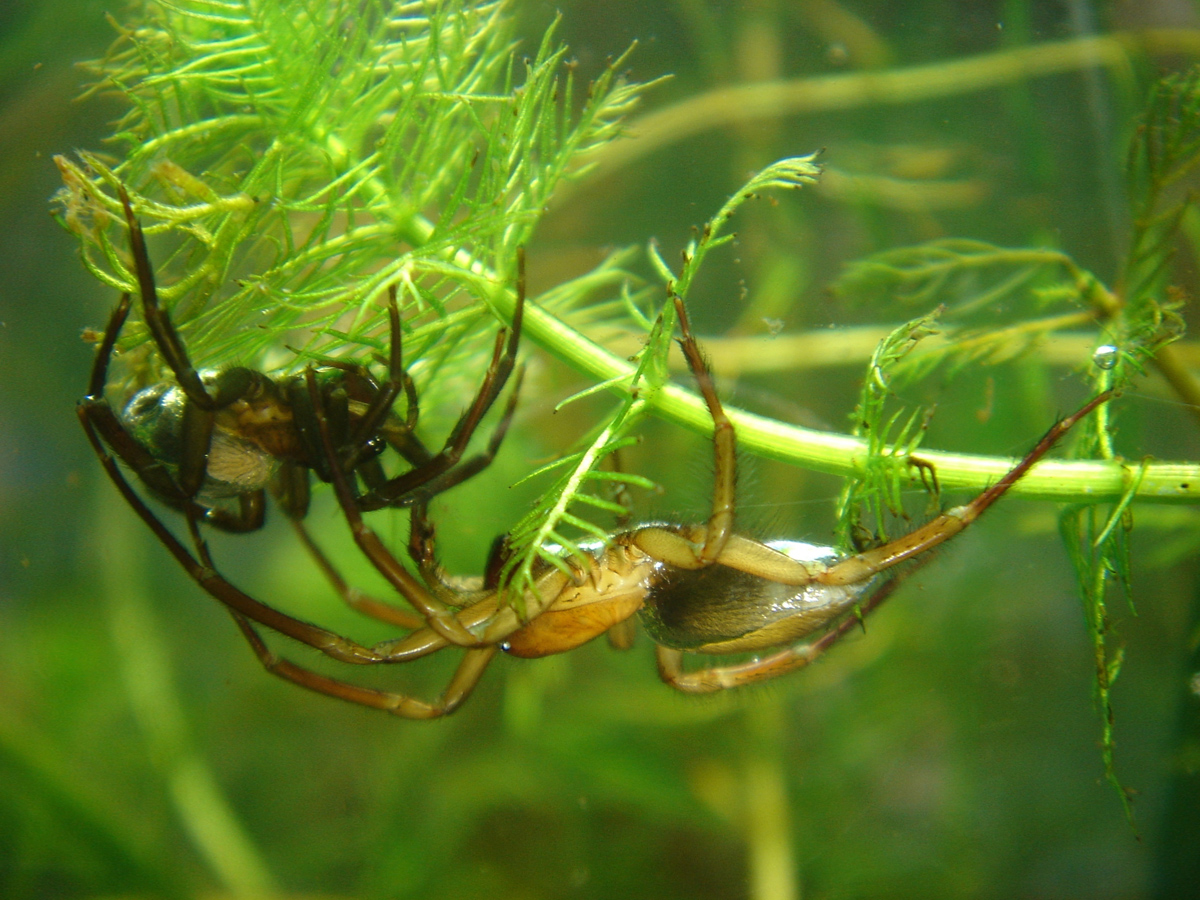
- Female (on left) and male

Conservation status
- Near Threatened (IUCN 3.1)

Scientific classification
- Kingdom: Animalia
- Phylum: Arthropoda
- Subphylum: Chelicerata
- Class: Arachnida
- Order: Araneae
- Infraorder: Araneomorphae
- Family: Argyronetidae
- Genus: Argyroneta; Latreille, 1804
- Species: A. aquatica

Binomial name
- Argyroneta aquatica (Clerck, 1758)

Synonyms
- Aranea amphibia Müller, 1776; Aranea aquatica Linnaeus, 1758; Araneus aquaticus Clerck, 1757; Aranea urinatoria Poda, 1761; Clubiona fallax Walckenaer, 1837

= Diving bell spider =

Diving bell spider Temporal range: Neogene–present

Genus of spiders

The diving bell spider or water spider (Argyroneta aquatica) is the only species of spider known to live almost entirely under water. It is the only member of the genus Argyroneta and the type genus of the family Argyronetidae. When out of the water, the spider ranges in colour from mid to dark brown, although the hairs on the abdomen give it a dark grey, velvet-like appearance. It is native to freshwater habitats in Europe and Asia.

== Uniqueness of aquatic behavior ==
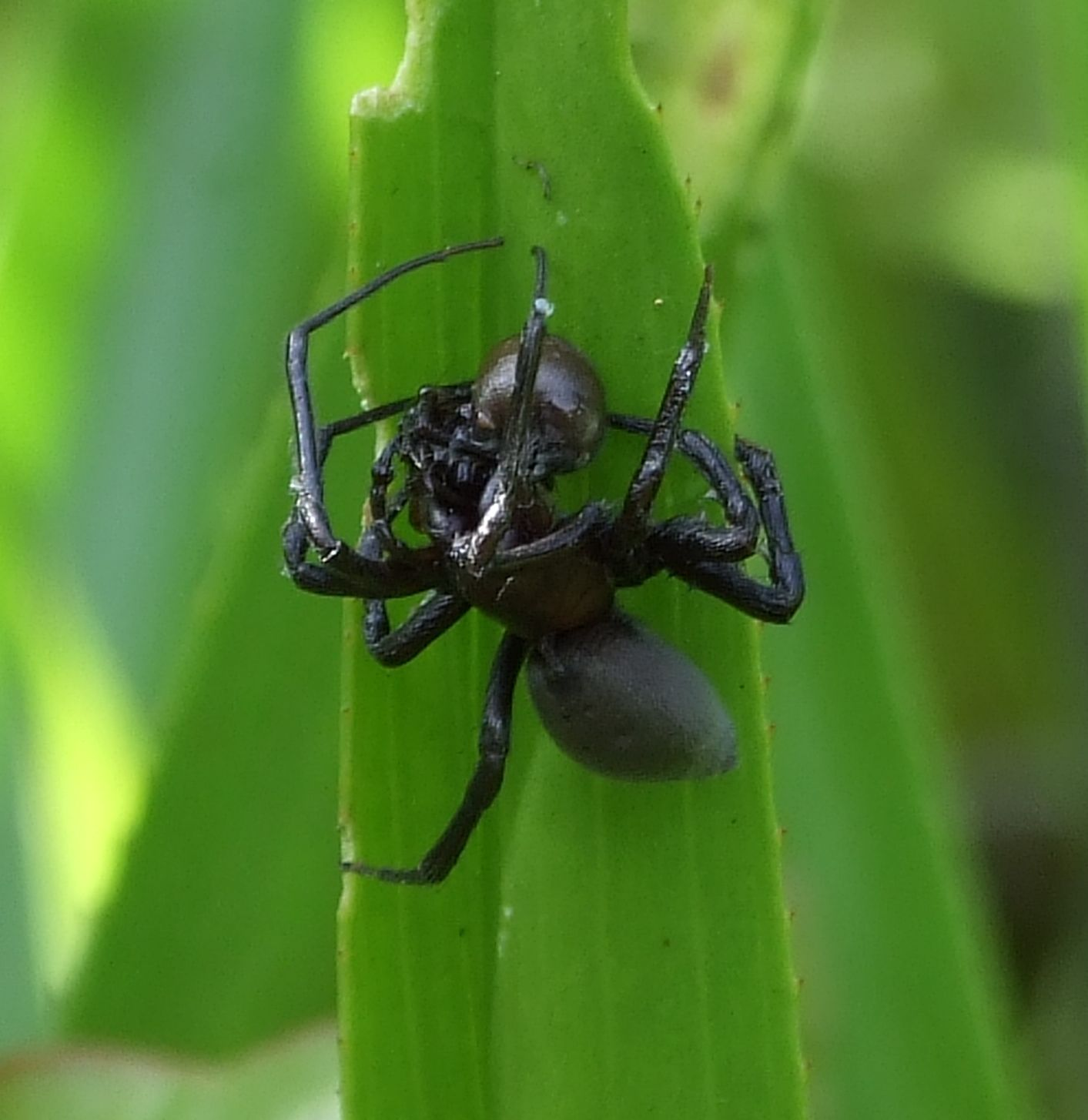
Although prey is usually consumed underwater in the diving bell, it is occasionally brought to the surface.

A. aquatica is the only known species of spider that spends almost all its life underwater, including resting, catching and eating prey, mating, egg laying, and overwintering. It only briefly surfaces to replenish its oxygen supply and occasionally will bring prey to the surface.

Several other spiders are semiaquatic, either periodically living underwater or willing to dive. For example, certain Desis species spend the high tide in an air-filled underwater retreat made from silk and forage on land in the intertidal zone during low tide. Some spiders living in periodically flooded habitats can survive for an extended period underwater by entering a coma-like state, up to 16–36 hours in Arctosa fulvolineata. Numerous species, including some Ancylometes, Dolomedes, Megadolomedes, Pardosa, Pirata, Thalassius and others, live above water at the surface, but may actively submerge for a prolonged period, are strong swimmers and will catch underwater prey. Several of these, as well as a few others, may dive into the water to avoid larger predators.

== Distribution and habitat ==
A. aquatica is found in clean freshwater habitats with aquatic vegetation, such as lakes, ponds, canals, marshes and slow-moving streams. It ranges through much of mainland Europe (no records from Portugal, Greece and Albania), the British Isles and central to northern Asia ranging as far south as Iran and as far north as Siberia, up to latitude 62°N. Most of the range is inhabited by the nominate subspecies, but Japan has its own subspecies, the very similar A. a. japonica.

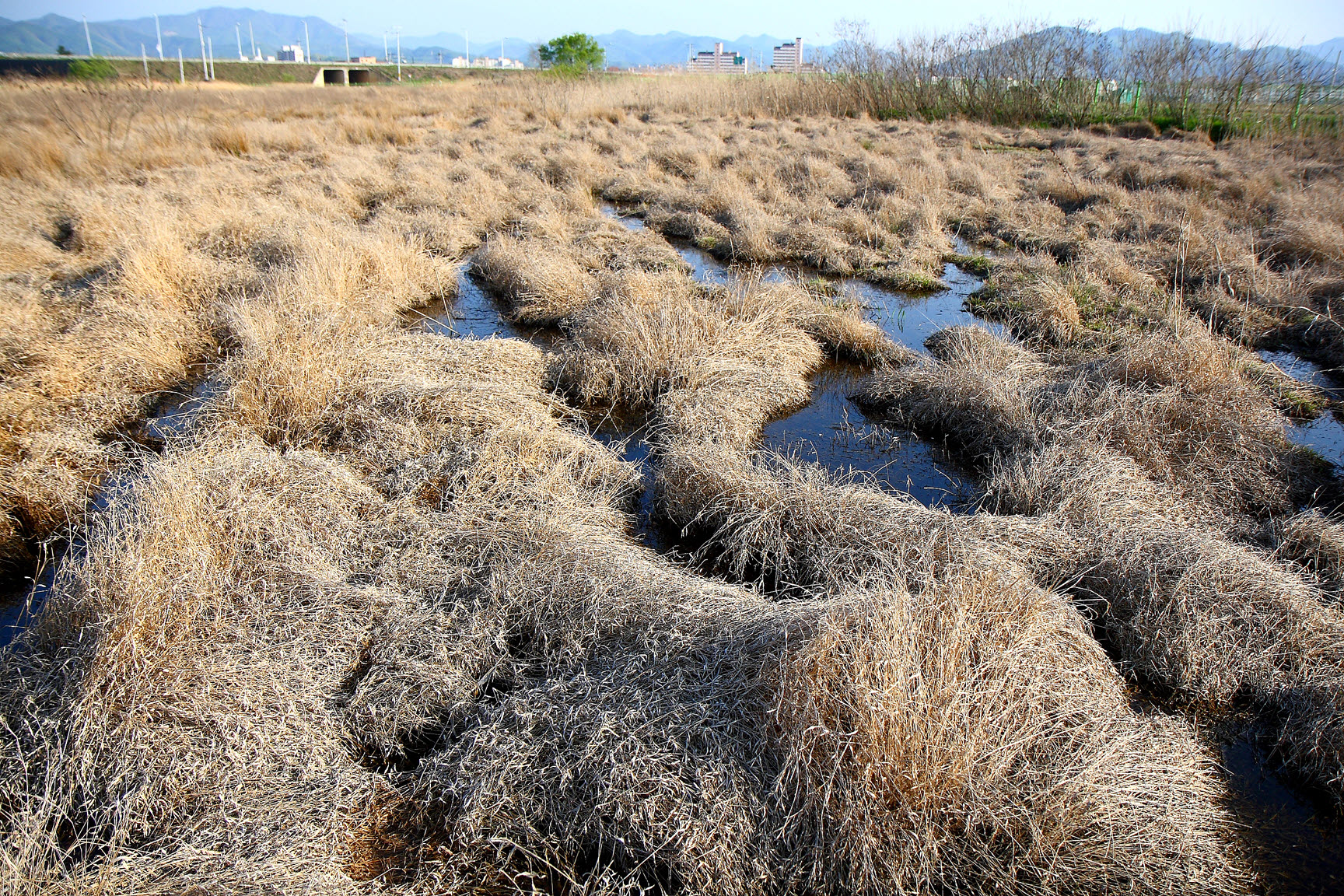
Habitat at Yeoncheon Eundaeri Water Spider Habitat

South Korea has a protected area, Yeoncheon Eundaeri water spider habitat, for this endangered species in that country.

== Ecology ==
As with other spiders it breathes air; when submerged in water, an air bubble is trapped by a dense layer of hydrophobic hairs on its abdomen and legs, giving the abdomen a silvery appearance. The spider lives for about two years in captivity.

A. aquatica is able to remain submerged for prolonged periods of time due to the silk-based structure it constructs in order to retain an oxygen supply, named after the diving bell structure it resembles. The species range in size, although the size of females may be limited as they put more energy into building and maintaining their larger bells. Males are more active and on average almost 30% larger than females, measuring 10–15 mm (0.39–0.59 in) in head-and-body length compared to 8–12 mm (0.31–0.47 in). This size differential favoring males is unusual for spiders, where sexual dimorphism is usually in favour of larger females. Theories suggest that the male's more active hunting style requires greater strength to overcome water resistance and counteract the buoyancy of their mobile air supplies. This larger body size is also associated with longer front legs, shown to affect diving ability and giving the males superiority in diving over the more sessile females. In addition, females build larger air bells than males, as the bell is also used to care for the offspring, forcing them to collect air from the surface much more frequently. And the larger the body, the more air is trapped on their abdomen, which means more buoyancy to overcome. Larger females therefore have higher energy costs than males of the same size and smaller females, which could limit the number of offspring they are able to produce.

The spiders prey on aquatic insects and crustaceans such as mosquito larvae and Daphnia. The spiders themselves fall prey to frogs and fish.

== Diving bell ==
The appearance of the diving bell gave rise to the genus name Argyroneta, from the Greek "argyros" (ἄργυρος), meaning "silver", and "neta", a neologism (perhaps for *νητής) derived from the verb "neo" (νέω) "spin", intended to mean "spinner of silver". Both sexes build diving bell webs which are used for digesting prey, although only the female's larger bell is used for mating and raising offspring. Females spend most of their time within their bells, darting out to catch prey animals that touch the bell or the silk threads that anchor it and occasionally surfacing to replenish the air within the web. The bells built by males are typically smaller than females' and are replenished less often. It is thought that prior to mating, the male constructs a diving bell adjacent to the female's then spins a tunnel from his bell, breaking into hers to gain entrance. Mating takes place in the female's bell. The female spider then constructs an egg sac within her bell, laying between 30 and 70 eggs. Where this species moults is less clear, with some sources stating that it occurs below water in the diving bell and others that it occurs out of water.

Diving bells are irregularly constructed sheets of silk and an unknown protein-based hydrogel which is spun between submerged water plants then inflated with air brought down from the surface by the builder. Studies have considered gas diffusion between the diving bell and the spiders' aquatic environment. The silk is waterproof but allows gas exchange with the surrounding water. There is net diffusion of oxygen into the bell and net diffusion of carbon dioxide out. This process is driven by differences in partial pressure. The production of carbon dioxide and use of oxygen by the spider maintains the concentration gradient, required for diffusion. However, there is net diffusion of nitrogen out of the bell, resulting in a gradually shrinking air bubble which must be regularly replenished by the spider.

Larger spiders are able to produce larger bubbles which have a consequently higher oxygen conductance, but all spiders of this species are able to enlarge their bells in response to increased oxygen demands in low aquatic P(O_{2}) environments. These spiders voluntarily tolerate internal conditions of low oxygen, enlarging their bells with air when the P(O_{2}) drops below 1 kPa; this replenishment process may not need to occur for several days, in some cases. This system has been referred to as "the water spider's aqua-lung of air bubbles", though an aqua-lung lacks gas exchange with the surroundings; this system is more properly regarded as an inorganic form of gill.

== Bite ==
Their bite is often described as being very painful to humans and as causing localised inflammation, vomiting, and slight feverishness that disappears after 5–10 days. However, solid evidence is lacking, with information being based on old and unverified reports because recent confirmed and published reports are lacking, leading some sources to refer to its bite as reputedly painful.
