= Ninja Museum of Igaryu =

Museum in Iga, Mie Prefecture, Japan

Coordinates: 34°46′18.2″N 136°7′44.8″E

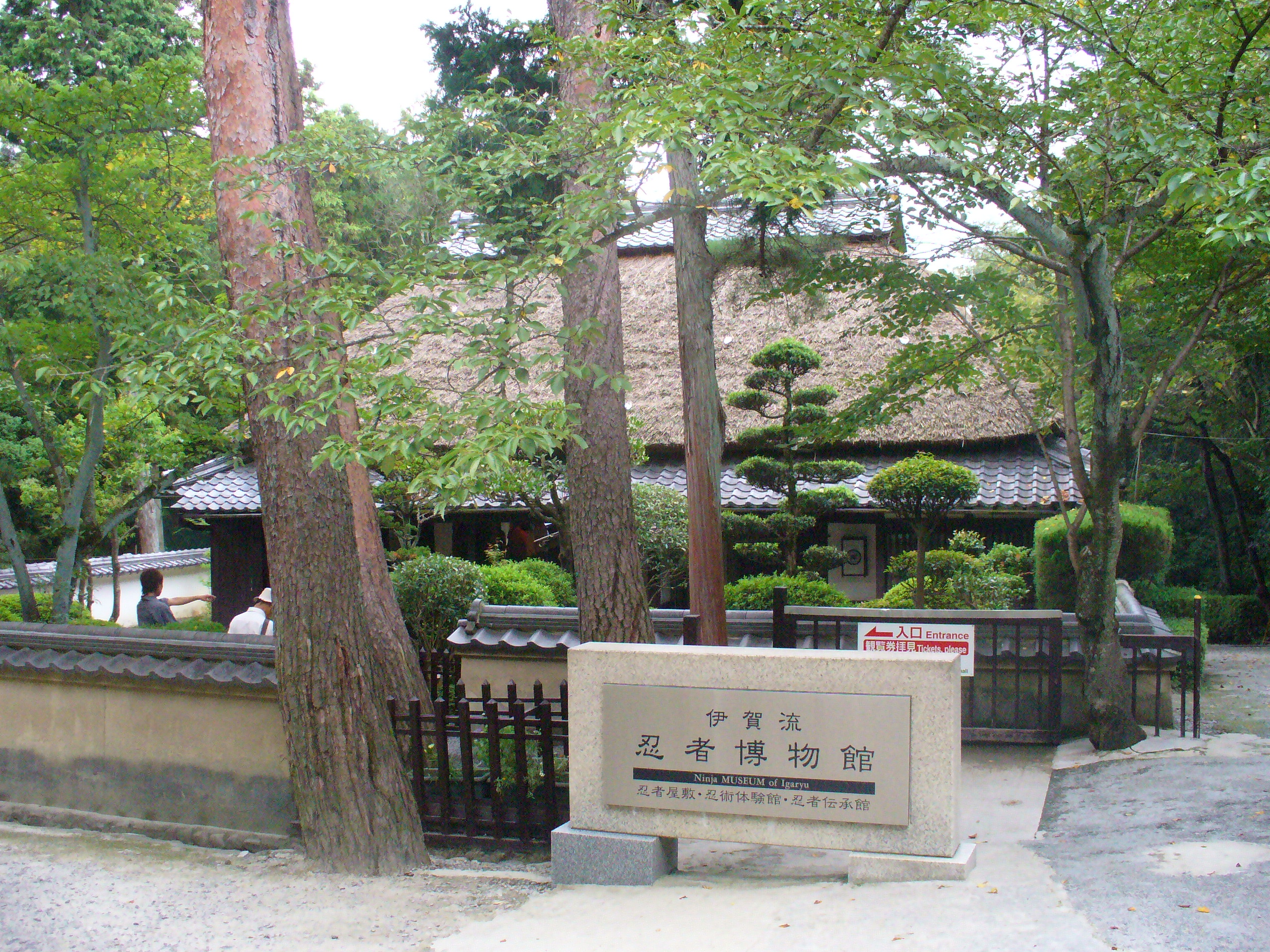
Exterior of the museum

The Ninja Museum of Igaryu (伊賀流忍者博物館, Iga-ryū Ninja Hakubutsukan) situated in a forested location in Iga, Mie Prefecture, Japan, is a museum dedicated to the history of the ninja and ninjutsu. It was established in 1964 and is located near Iga Ueno Castle. Jinichi Kawakami, who serves as the honorary director of the Iga-ryū Ninja Museum, is proclaimed to be the 21st head of Iga-ryū ninjutsu.

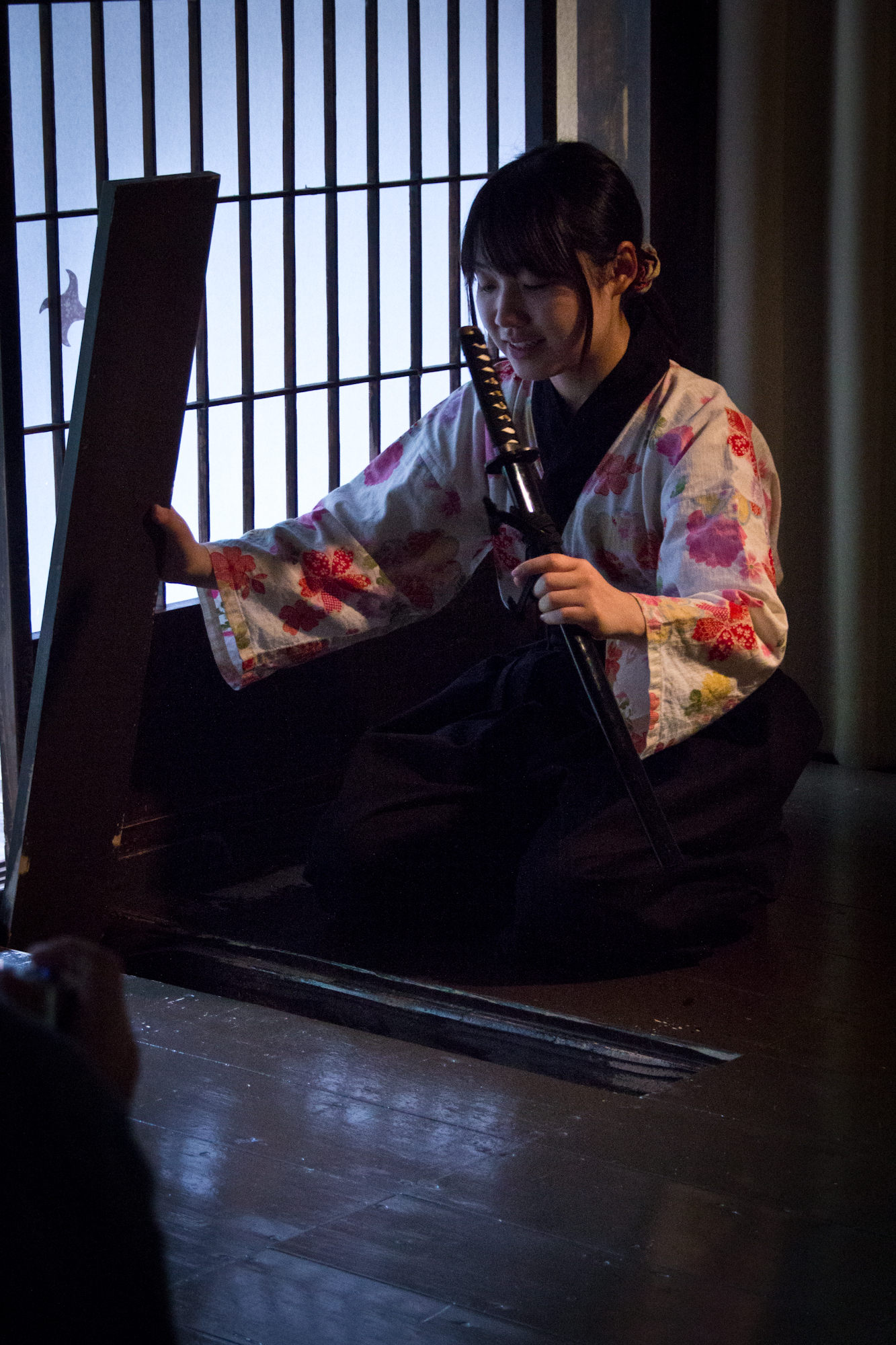
Ninja village tour

The museum's collection includes ancient ninjutsu writings analyzed scientifically along with ancient ninjutsu weapons. The museum has audiovisuals, models and extensive static displays of the weaponry and techniques employed by ninja. There are over 400 ninja tools and weapons on display, including shuriken used in the time of the ninja. The museum also features a model village with tours and demonstrations of its features. The museum allows visitors to throw ninja weapons and has ninja shows. It is a popular tourist attraction.

On August 17, 2020, during the pre-dawn hours, thieves broke into the museum, and within three minutes, stole a 150 kg (330 lb) safe containing over one million yen of admission fees.

== See also ==
- Iga-ryū
- Iga Ueno Ninja Festa
