= Iga-ryū =

Ninja tradition of Japan

Iga-ryū (伊賀流, "the Iga School") is an umbrella term for ninjutsu traditions that come from the Iga region, according to Japanese legend. It became one of the two most well-known ninja traditions in Japan. The Iga-ryū traditions originated in the Iga Province in the area around the towns of Iga, Ueno, and Nabari (modern Iga City and Nabari City in Mie Prefecture). Iga-mono is a synonym for Iga ninja.

== History ==
Since the Nara period, the Iga district had supplied lumber to jisha (寺社, temple-shrines). But in the Kamakura period, jisha declined in influence while shugo (governors) and jitō (manor administrators) grew dominant. The power of these functionaries then waned in Iga while that of bushi (warriors) rose instead. Iga was divided into local jizamurai regions locked in guerrilla war for which Iga warriors developed specialized skills and tactics.

During the early Muromachi period, the people of Iga became independent of their feudal overlords and established a kind of republic—Iga Sokoku Ikki (伊賀惣国一揆) in Japanese. Iga-mono 伊賀者 (Iga men) first appear in historical records in 1487 when the Shōgun Ashikaga Yoshihisa attacked Rokkaku Takayori, the daimyō of southern Ōmi Province from the Rokkaku clan. Both Iga and the Koga ninja fought on the side of Rokkaku, helping to successfully repel the shōgun's attack. In 1579, warlord Oda Nobunaga's son Oda Nobukatsu launched an unsuccessful attack against the Iga Republic. In 1581, Oda Nobunaga himself attacked Iga from six directions with a force of 40,000 to 60,000 men, about a ten to one advantage, and slaughtered many Iga ninja and their families. The Iga held only two castles when Nobunaga declared a ceasefire and allowed some of the ninja to escape.

In 1582, during the turmoil following Oda Nobunaga's death, Hattori Hanzō advised Tokugawa Ieyasu to escape to Mikawa through the Kōga and Iga regions. Ieyasu, when he became the shōgun, employed ninja to guard Edo Castle—the headquarters of the Tokugawa shogunate—and to supply intelligence. He settled 200 men from the Iga-ryū in the Yotsuya neighborhood of Edo (Tokyo). Hanzo's Gate in Edo Castle took its name from the nearby residence of the Hattori clan.

Hattori Hanzō's son Hattori Masanari commanded the castle's Iga guards but proved a less successful leader than his father. In 1606, the Iga men rebelled due to harsh treatment. They continued to serve the shogunate as a musketeer unit and as dōshin, low ranking samurai policemen, with their ninja skills gradually fading out in later generations. One of the last known recorded ninja missions performed by an Iga ninja was in the late Bakumatsu period of the 19th century, when an Iga ninja by the name of Sawamura Yasusuke (沢村 甚三郎 保祐) infiltrated one of the black ships of Commodore Matthew C. Perry.

== Organization ==
Iga ninja were trained in disguise, escape, concealment, explosives, medicine, and poisons, as well as more conventional forms of warfare such as unarmed combat and various forms of weaponry. They used scaling hooks for climbing and many different tools, such as lock picks and ladders. According to the Bansenshukai, Iga ninja of the Fujibayashi family also used a special water flotation device called Mizugumo (displayed at the Iga-ryu Ninja Museum). The ninja of the Iga-ryū was also divided into different "classes" and ranks, based solely on the ninja's skill level. This hierarchy was simplified in the writings of the mid-20th-century author Heishichiro Okuse, who labeled them into three general categories: "jonin (upper ninja)", "chūnin (middle ninja)", and "genin (lower ninja)". This modernized model is very often seen in various pop culture ninja media such as the Naruto franchise and the Shinobi no Mono movie series starring actor Ichikawa Raizo.

== See also ==
- Iga-ryū Ninja Museum
- Kōga-ryū, umbrella term for a major school of ninjutsu
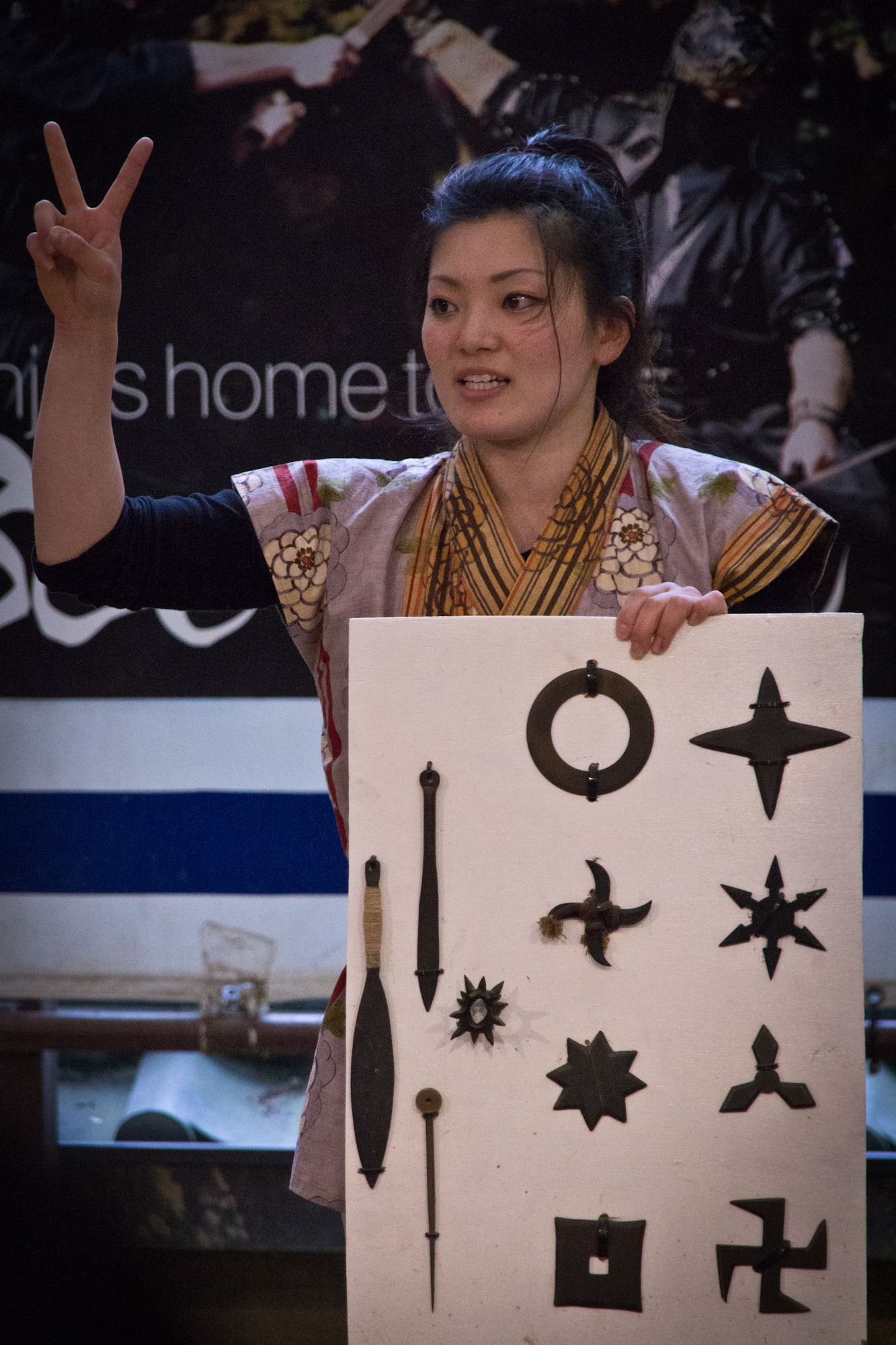
  https://www.flickr.com/photos/johnji/7188547299/
