= Bansenshūkai =

1676 Japanese book

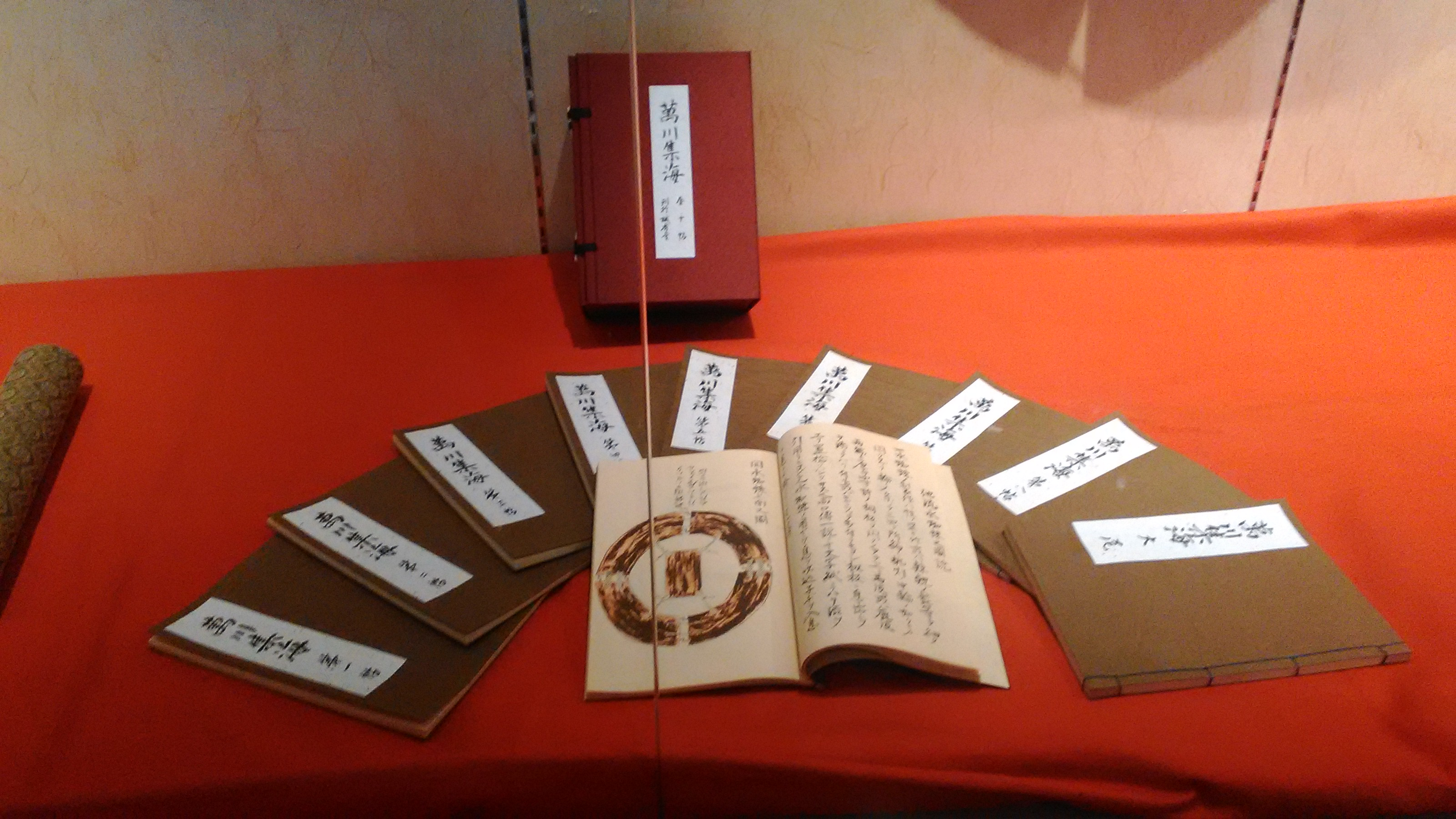
Bansenshukai

Bansenshūkai (萬川集海, Ten Thousand Rivers Flowing Together to form an Ocean) (Also pronounced Mansenshukai) is a 1676 Japanese book containing a collection of knowledge from the clans in the Iga and Kōga, The book was compiled by Fujibayashi Yasutake (descendant of Fujibayashi Nagato-no-kami) in 1676, in the early years of the Tokugawa shogunate.

== Compilation ==
Bansenshūkai summarizes the main points of the three volumes of the original Ninjutsu book Kanrinseiyō (間林清陽), and was written by selecting only those that fit the times. In the beginning of Bansenshūkai, the existence of the original text Kanrinseiyō was mentioned, but its existence had not been confirmed for a long time. However, in June 2022, a manuscript of the second volume of Kanrinseiyō copied in 1748 was found.

It was written to preserve the knowledge that had been developed during the near-constant military conflict from the Ōnin War until the end of the Siege of Osaka almost 150 years later. As well as information on military strategy and weapons, it has sections on the astrological and philosophical beliefs of the times, and along with the Shōninki of 1681 and the Ninpiden of 1560 make up the three major sources of direct information about this shadowy profession.

== Contents ==
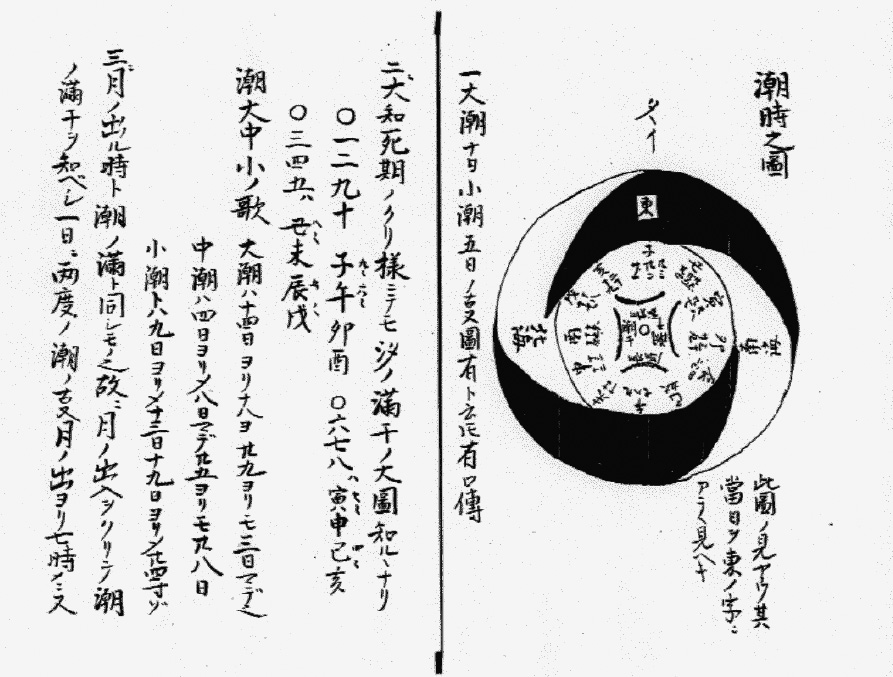
This diagram from the Bansenshukai uses divination and esoteric cosmology (onmyōdō) to instruct on the ideal time for taking certain actions.

The books include:

- Two volumes of thought and philosophy
- Four volumes on leadership
- Three volumes on Yo-nin—open disguise
- Five volumes on In-nin—hidden infiltration
- Two volumes on astrology
- Five volumes on tools and weapons

== Versions ==
There are two versions:

1. The Koga Version has twenty-two chapters bound in ten volumes, with an additional one volume attached to it.
2. The Iga Version has twenty-two chapters bound in twelve volumes with an additional four chapters in four volumes attached to it.

== Copies ==
Toward the end of the 18th century, representatives from Koga petitioned the shogunate for a stipend. Among the documents they provided to the government to make their case was a copy of the Bansenshukai. This copy is still in the National Diet Library.

After World War II, a limited number of handwritten copies were offered to the public. A few of these copies are in some major national and university libraries. It has recently been re-translated in various languages including English, French, German, and Japanese.
