= Umemura Sawano =

Female ninja

Umemura Sawano (梅村 澤野) was a Kunoichi (female ninja) who is thought to have served the Takeda clan. 竊奸秘伝書, the 13 meters long ninjutsu scroll handed down in Matsushiro Domain introduced her as the founder of this school of ninja. Sanada clan, the daimyō of Matsusiro domain was former retainer of Takeda clan and Umemura Sawano worked for them.
