= Shōninki =

Japanese medieval ninja document

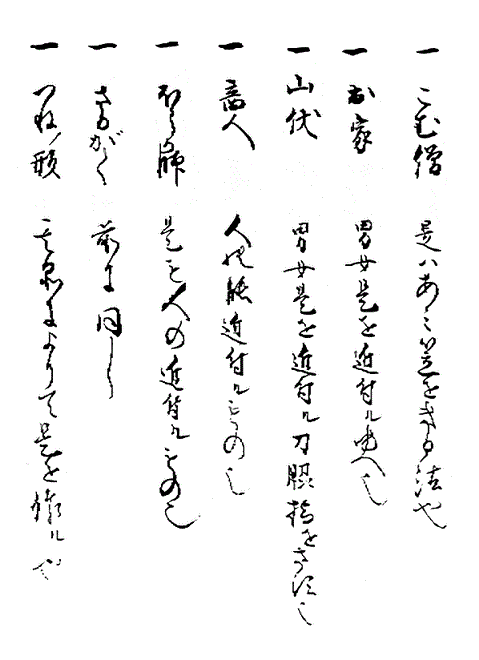
Shōninki font

The Shōninki (Japanese 正 忍 記) is a medieval ninja document from Kishū province.

Written by Natori Masatake in 1681 it describes the espionage strategies of the shinobi from Kishū. Together with the Bansenshukai and Ninpiden it is one of three major extant writings of the ninja. An original copy of the Shōninki is in the State Library of Tokyo.

== Contents ==
The Shōninki is divided into Preface (Jo), three scrolls (Shomaki, Chumaki, Gemaki) and an epilogue (Okusho).

In the preface, the author discusses the different types of spies and the principles of espionage.

The first scroll addresses basic skills, such as disguise and concealment, housebreaking and information gathering. The second part deals with defense against enemy spies, human nature, physiognomy, recognizing and eliciting the true intentions of people and laying false trails and clues. The final scroll is concerned with one's own emotional states as well as those of other people (including godai).

== Bibliography ==
- 藤一水子正武, 中島篤巳 (1996). 忍術伝書正忍記. Tokyo: Shin Jinbutsu Ōraisha. ISBN 978-4404023988.
- Schedler, Claude (2004). Shoninki, Historical secret writing of the Ninja. Norderstedt: Books on Demand GmbH. ISBN 978-3833404146.
- Jon E. Graham, trans. Shoninki: The Secret Teachings of the Ninja; The 17th-Century Manual on the Art of Concealment. With commentaries by Axel Mazuer. Rochester, Vt.–Torono: 2010. ISBN 978-1594773433
- True Path of the Ninja: The Definitive Translation of the Shoninki (An Authentic Ninja Training Manual). Translated by Antony Cummins; Yoshie Minami. Berkeley, Calif.: Tuttle. 2012. ISBN 978-1583944356.
