= Ninjutsu =

Techniques and skills used by ninja

Ninjutsu (忍術)
- The kanji for "ninja"
- Also known as: Ninpō, Shinobi-jutsu
- Hardness: Non-competitive
- Country of origin: Japan
- Parenthood: Military tactics

Ninjutsu (忍術; [ɲiꜜɲ.dʑɯ.tsɯ]), shinobi no jutsu (忍びの術; [ɕi.no.bʲi no dʑɯ.tsɯꜜ]) and ninpō (忍法; [ɲiꜜm.poː]) are terms for the techniques and skills used by ninja, who were covert operatives, irregular warfare specialists and intelligence gatherers in pre-modern Japan. Some of these techniques are recorded in ninja scrolls, several of which have been published and translated. The study of these scrolls has changed the perception of ninja and ninjutsu.

While there are martial arts schools that claim to be modern styles of ninjutsu, the historical lineage of these styles only goes as far back as the 1950s.

== History ==
Spying in Japan dates as far back as Prince Shōtoku (572–622). According to Shōninki, the first open usage of ninjutsu during a military campaign was in the Genpei War, when Minamoto no Kuro Yoshitsune chose warriors to serve as shinobi (ninja) during a battle. This manuscript goes on to say that during the Kenmu era, Kusunoki Masashige frequently used ninjutsu. According to footnotes in this manuscript, the Genpei War lasted from 1180 to 1185, and the Kenmu Restoration occurred between 1333 and 1336.

The history of Ninjutsu schools can be traced to around the 12th century, when Daisuke Togakure and Kain Doshi are said to have formalized the teaching of Chinese and native Japanese guerilla tactics, which were regarded as unconventional at the time. As a samurai, Daisuke lost his lands and title after being defeated in a regional conflict. After refusing to commit Seppuku, Daisuke travelled to the mountains of southwest Honshu in 1162 where he met Doshi, a Chinese warrior-monk. Daisuke abandoned his way of bushido and worked with Doshi to formulate the guerilla art of war called ninjutsu. Daisuke's descendants founded the first ninja-ryu, or ninja school, the Togakureryu.

Ninjutsu proper was most likely developed during the Nanboku-cho period, used by samurai fighting on both sides of the conflict, and was further refined after the Onin War and throughout the Sengoku period, where many rising samurai warlords used ninja to gather intelligence and commit secret raids on their enemies. In the chaos following the Onin War, jizamurai from the Kōka and the Iga Province began to engage in guerrilla warfare in order to protect their lands from bandits, rogue yamabushi, and larger samurai forces. The jizamurai that lived in Kōka and Iga were self-sufficient and did not answer to the shugo governors of their lands, in which the local samurai of both regions operated as de facto independent confederacies – the Kōka and Iga ikki – and formed an alliance together which persisted until the conquest of Kōka by Oda Nobunaga in 1574 and the conquest of Iga in 1581.

== Training ==
The skills required of the ninja have come to be known in modern times as ninjutsu (忍術), but it is unlikely they were previously named under a single discipline, rather distributed among a variety of espionage and survival skills. Some view ninjutsu as evidence that ninja were not simple mercenaries because texts contained not only information on combat training, but also information about daily needs, which even included mining techniques. The guidance provided for daily work also included elements that enable the ninja to understand the martial qualities of even the most menial task. These factors show how the ninjutsu established among the ninja class the fundamental principle of adaptation.

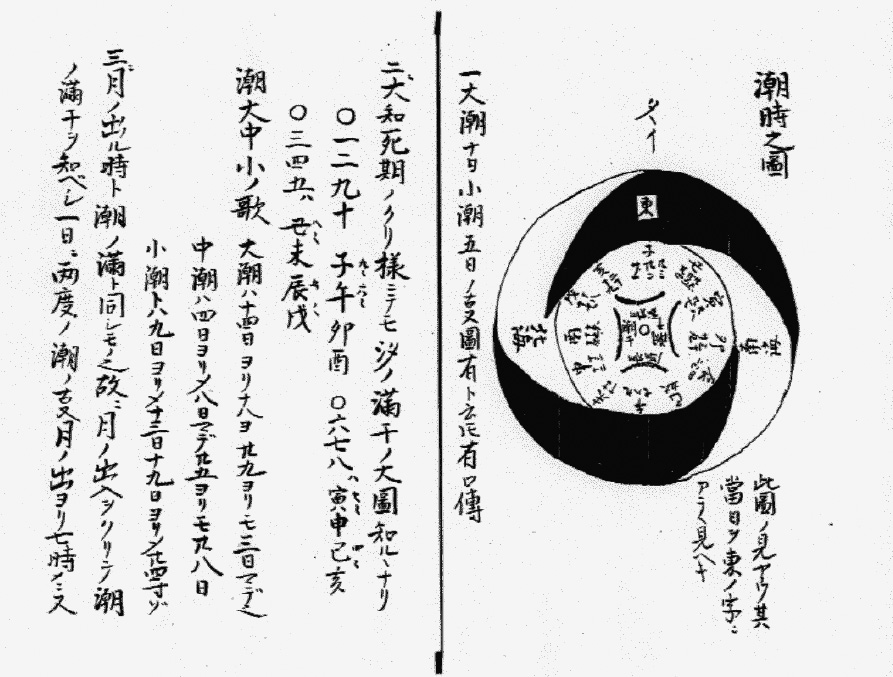
This diagram from the Bansenshūkai uses divination and esoteric cosmology (onmyōdō) to instruct on the ideal time for taking certain actions.

The first specialized training began in the mid-15th century, when certain samurai families started to focus on covert warfare, including espionage and assassination. According to Turnbull, the ninja was trained from childhood, as was also common in samurai families.

Outside the expected martial art disciplines, a youth studied survival and scouting techniques, as well as information regarding poisons and explosives. Physical training was also important, which involved long-distance runs, climbing, stealth methods of walking and swimming. A certain degree of knowledge regarding common professions was also required if one was expected to take their form in disguise. Some evidence of medical training can be derived from one account, where an Iga ninja provided first aid to Ii Naomasa, who was injured by gunfire in the Battle of Sekigahara. Here the ninja reportedly gave Naomasa a "black medicine" meant to stop bleeding.

With the fall of the Iga and Kōga clans, daimyō could no longer recruit professional ninja, and were forced to train their own shinobi. The shinobi was considered a real profession, as demonstrated in the 1649 bakufu law on military service, which declared that only daimyō with an income of over 10,000 koku were allowed to retain shinobi. In the two centuries that followed, a number of ninjutsu manuals were written by descendants of Hattori Hanzō as well as members of the Fujibayashi clan, an offshoot of the Hattori. Major examples include the Ninpiden (1655), the Bansenshūkai (1675), and the Shōninki (1681).

Modern schools that claim to train ninjutsu arose from the 1970s, including that of Masaaki Hatsumi (Bujinkan) and Jinichi Kawakami (Banke Shinobinoden). The lineage and authenticity of these schools are a matter of controversy.

=== Tactics ===
Most ninjutsu techniques recorded in scrolls and manuals revolve around ways to avoid detection, and methods of escape. These techniques were loosely grouped under corresponding natural elements. Some examples are:

- Hitsuke: The practice of distracting guards by starting a fire away from the ninja's planned point of entry. Falls under "fire techniques" (katon-no-jutsu).
- Tanuki-gakure: The practice of climbing a tree and camouflaging oneself within the foliage. Falls under "wood techniques" (mokuton-no-jutsu).
- Ukigusa-gakure: The practice of throwing duckweed over water to conceal underwater movement. Falls under "water techniques" (suiton-no-jutsu).
- Uzura-gakure: The practice of curling into a ball and remaining motionless to appear like a stone. Falls under "earth techniques" (doton-no-jutsu).

=== Disguises ===
The use of disguises is common and well documented. Disguises came in the form of priests, entertainers, fortune tellers, merchants, rōnin, and monks. The Buke Myōmokushō states,

Shinobi-monomi were people used in secret ways, and their duties were to go into the mountains and disguise themselves as firewood gatherers to discover and acquire the news about an enemy's territory... they were particularly expert at travelling in disguise.

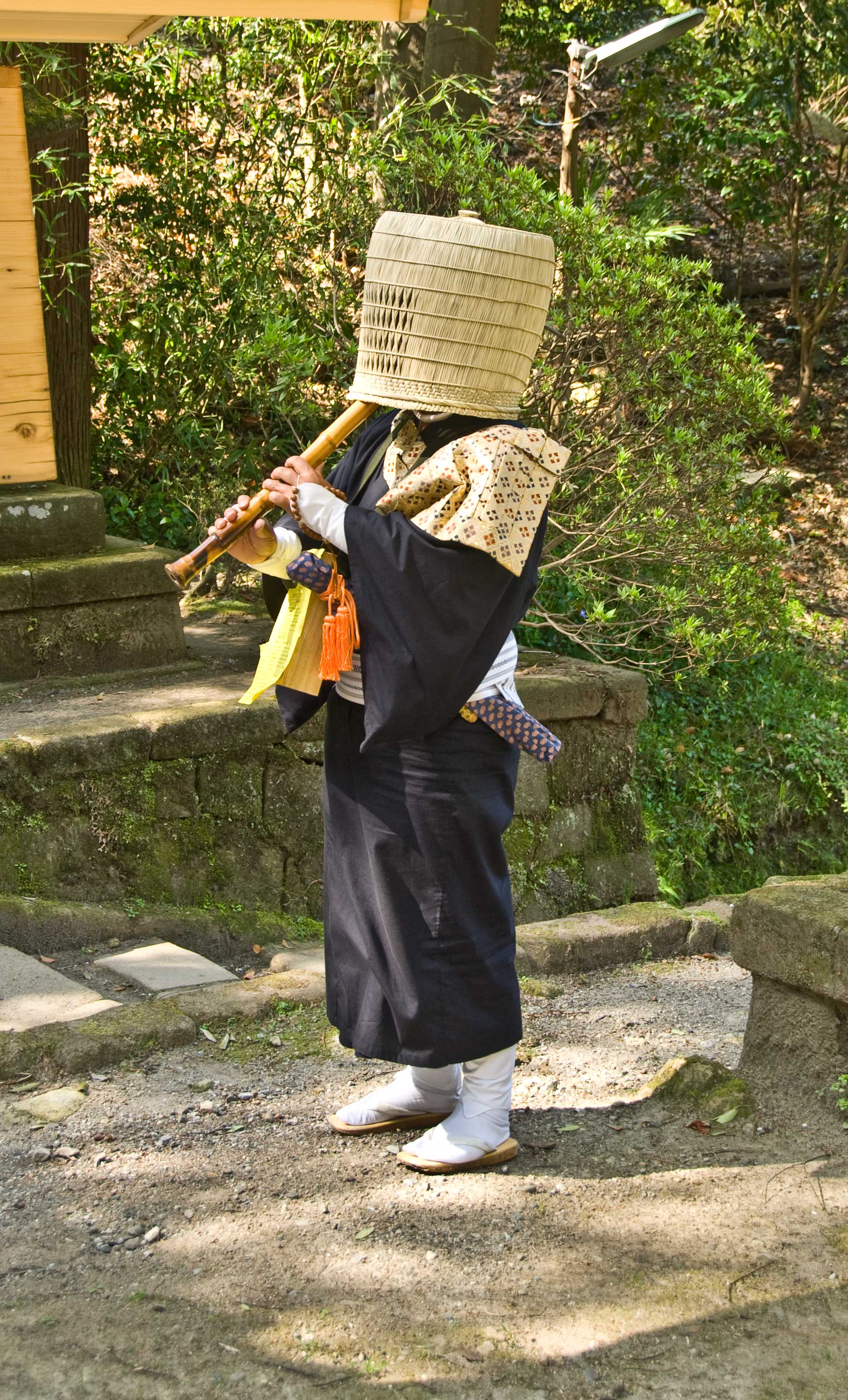
A komusō monk is one of many possible disguises.

A mountain ascetic (yamabushi) attire facilitated travel, as they were common and could travel freely between political boundaries. The loose robes of Buddhist priests also allowed concealed weapons, such as the tantō.

== Equipment ==
Ninja used a large variety of tools and weaponry, some of which were commonly known, but others were more specialized. Most were tools used in the infiltration of castles. A wide range of specialized equipment is described and illustrated in the 17th-century Bansenshūkai, including climbing equipment, extending spears, rocket-propelled arrows, and small collapsible boats.

=== Outerwear ===
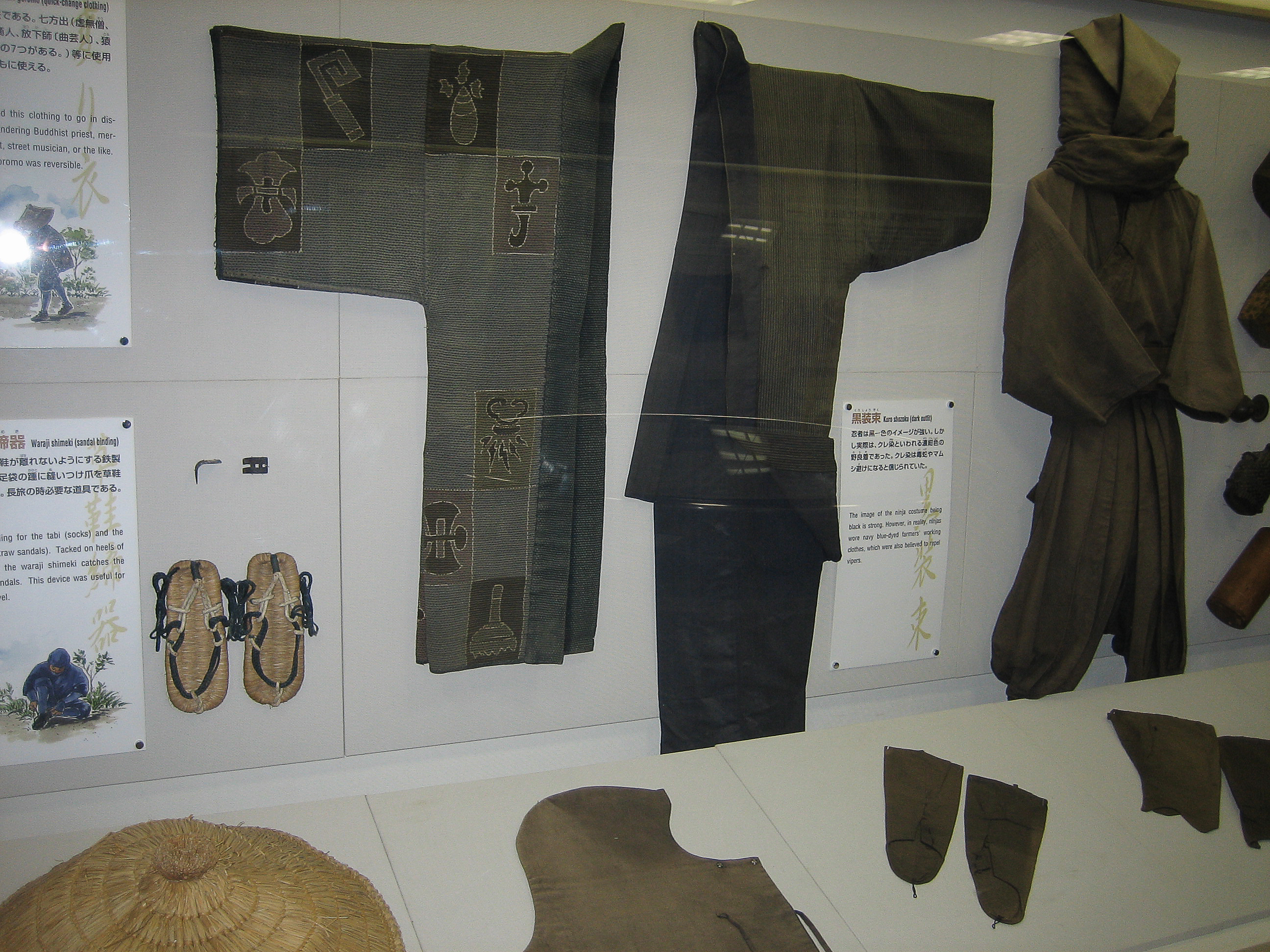
Kuro shozoku ninja costume and waraji (sandals). The image of the ninja costume being black is strong. However, in reality, ninjas wore navy blue-dyed farmers' working clothes, which were also believed to repel vipers.

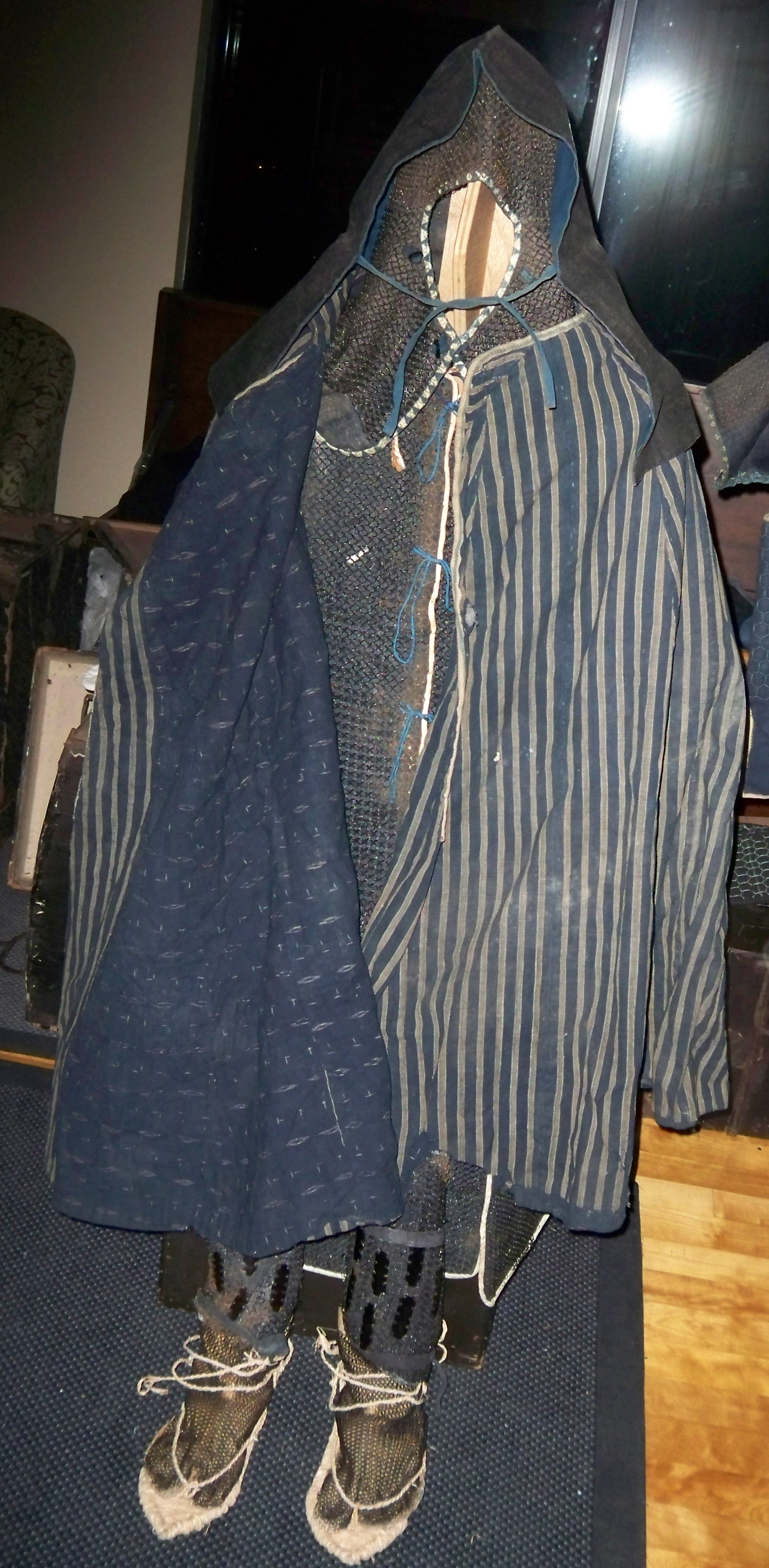
Antique Japanese gappa (travel cape) and cloth zukin (hood) with kusari (chain armour) concealed underneath

While the image of a ninja clad in black garb (shinobi shōzoku) is prevalent in popular media, there is no hard evidence for such attire. It is theorized that, instead, it was much more common for the ninja to be disguised as civilians. The popular notion of black clothing may be rooted in artistic convention; early drawings of ninja showed them dressed in black to portray a sense of invisibility.; Turnbull uses the name Buke Meimokushō, an alternate reading for the same title. This convention may have been borrowed from the puppet handlers of bunraku theater, who dressed in total black in an effort to simulate props moving independently of their controls.

The tenugui, a piece of cloth also used in martial arts, had many functions. It could be used to cover the face, form a belt, or assist in climbing.

The historicity of armor specifically made for ninja cannot be ascertained. While pieces of light armor purportedly worn by ninja exist and date to the right time, there is no hard evidence of their use in ninja operations. Depictions of famous persons later deemed ninja often show them in samurai armor. There were lightweight concealable types of armour made with kusari (chain armour) and small armor plates such as karuta that could have been worn by ninja including katabira (jackets) made with armour hidden between layers of cloth. Shin and arm guards, along with metal-reinforced hoods are also speculated to make up the ninja's armor.

=== Tools ===
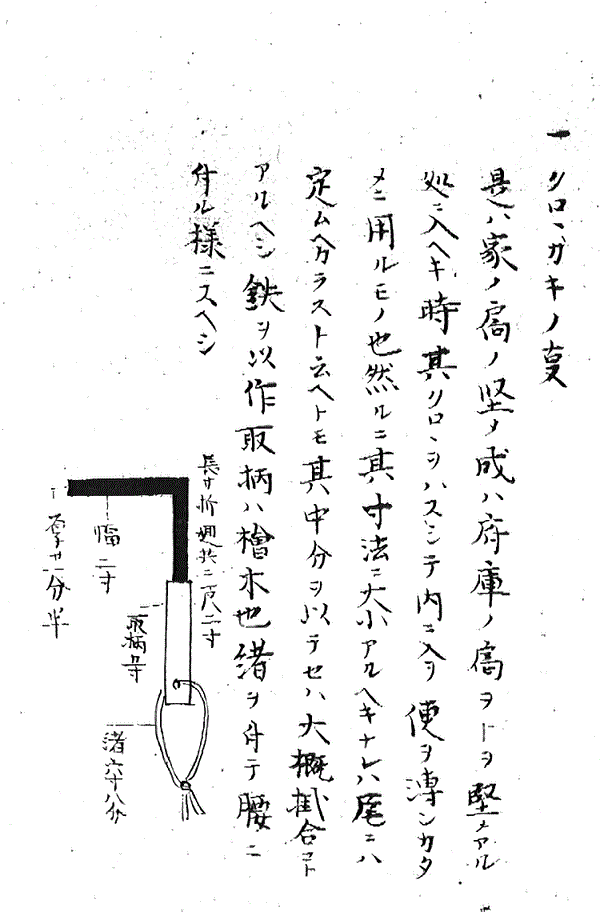
A page from the Ninpiden, showing a tool for breaking locks

Tools used for infiltration and espionage are some of the most abundant artifacts related to the ninja. Ropes and grappling hooks were common, and were tied to the belt. A collapsible ladder is illustrated in the Bansenshukai, featuring spikes at both ends to anchor the ladder. Spiked or hooked climbing gear worn on the hands and feet also doubled as weapons. Other implements include chisels, hammers, drills, picks, and so forth.

The kunai was a heavy pointed tool, possibly derived from the Japanese masonry trowel, which it closely resembles. Although it is often portrayed in popular culture as a weapon, the kunai was primarily used for gouging holes in walls.

The mizugumo was a set of wooden shoes supposedly allowing the ninja to walk on water. They were meant to work by distributing the wearer's weight over the shoes' wide bottom surface. The word mizugumo is derived from the native name for the Japanese water spider (Argyroneta aquatica japonica). The mizugumo was featured on the show MythBusters, where it was demonstrated unfit for walking on water. The ukidari, a similar footwear for walking on water, also existed in the form of a flat round bucket, but was probably quite unstable. Inflatable skins and breathing tubes allowed the ninja to stay underwater for longer periods of time.

Goshiki-mai (go, five; shiki, color; mai, rice) colored (red, blue, yellow, black, purple) rice grains were used in a code system, and to make trails that could be followed later.

Despite the large array of tools available to the ninja, the Bansenshukai warns one not to be overburdened with equipment, stating "a successful ninja is one who uses but one tool for multiple tasks".

=== Weaponry ===
Although shorter swords and daggers were used, the katana was probably the ninja's weapon of choice, and was sometimes carried on the back. The katana had several uses beyond normal combat. In dark places, the scabbard could be extended out of the sword, and used as a long probing device. The sword could also be laid against the wall, where the ninja could use the sword guard (tsuba) to gain a higher foothold. The katana could even be used as a device to stun enemies before attacking them, by putting a combination of red pepper, dirt or dust, and iron filings into the area near the top of the scabbard, so that as the sword was drawn the concoction would fly into the enemy's eyes, stunning him until a lethal blow could be made. While straight swords were used before the invention of the katana, there's no known historical information about the straight ninjatō pre-20th century. The first photograph of a ninjatō appeared in a booklet by Heishichirō Okuse in 1956. A replica of a ninjatō is on display at the Ninja Museum of Igaryu.

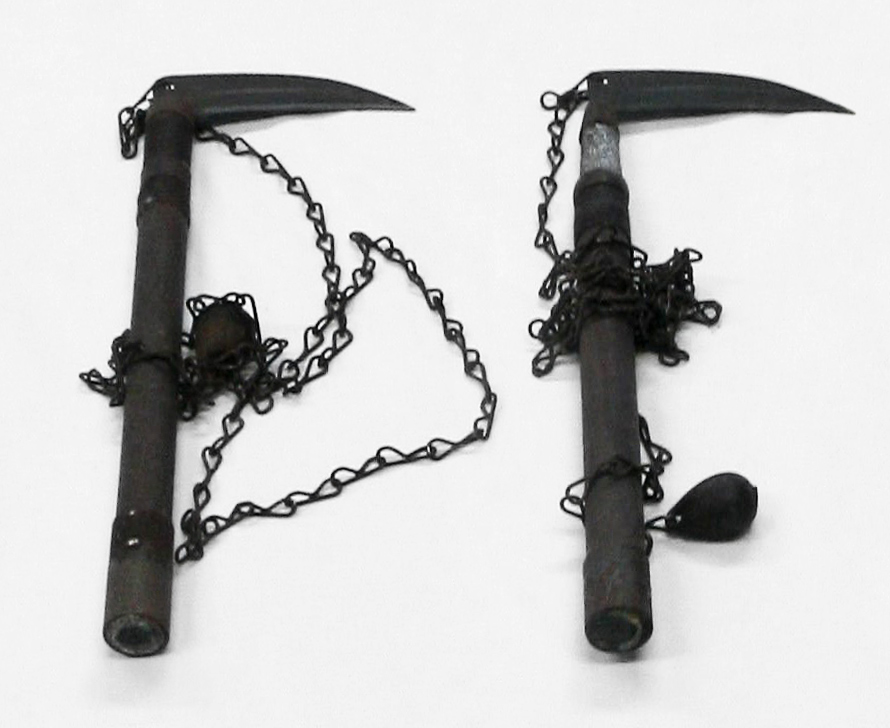
A pair of kusarigama, on display in Iwakuni Castle

An array of darts, spikes, knives, and sharp, star-shaped discs were known collectively as shuriken. While not exclusive to the ninja, they were an important part of the arsenal, where they could be thrown in any direction. Bows were used for sharpshooting, and some ninjas' bows were intentionally made smaller than the traditional yumi (longbow). The chain and sickle (kusarigama) was also used by the ninja.

Explosives introduced from China were known in Japan by the time of the Mongol Invasions in the 13th century. Later, explosives such as hand-held bombs and grenades were adopted by the ninja.

Along with common shinobi buki (ninja weapons), a large assortment of miscellaneous arms were associated with the ninja. Some examples include poison, makibishi (caltrops), shikomizue (cane swords), land mines, fukiya (blowguns), poisoned darts, acid-spurting tubes, and teppo jutsu (firearms). The happō, a small eggshell filled with metsubushi (blinding powder), was also used to facilitate escape.

== Legendary abilities ==
Perceived control over the elements may be grounded in real tactics, which were categorized by association with forces of nature. For example, the practice of starting fires to cover a ninja's trail falls under katon-no-jutsu ("fire techniques").

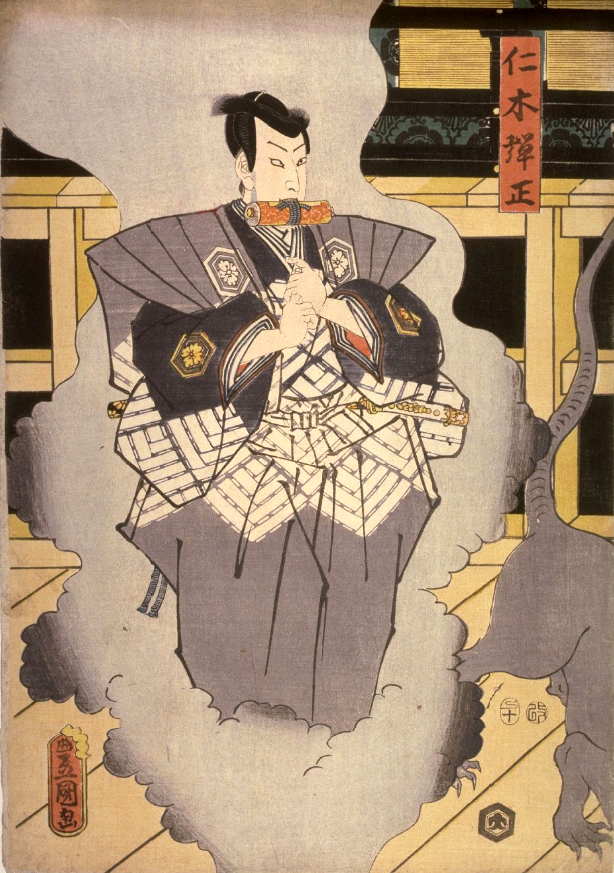
Actor portraying Nikki Danjō, a villain from the kabuki play Sendai Hagi. Shown with hands in a kuji-in seal, which allows him to transform into a giant rat. Woodblock print on paper. Kunisada, 1857.

The ninja's adaption of kites in espionage and warfare is another subject of legends. Accounts exist of ninja being lifted into the air by kites, where they flew over hostile terrain and descended into, or dropped bombs on enemy territory. Kites were indeed used in Japanese warfare, but mostly for the purpose of sending messages and relaying signals. Turnbull suggests that kites lifting a man into midair might have been technically feasible, but states that the use of kites to form a human "hang glider" falls squarely in the realm of fantasy.

=== Kuji-kiri ===
Kuji-kiri is an esoteric practice which, when performed with an array of hand "seals" (kuji-in), was meant to allow the ninja to enact superhuman feats.

The kuji ("nine characters") is a concept originating from Taoism, where it was a string of nine words used in charms and incantations. In China, this tradition mixed with Buddhist beliefs, assigning each of the nine words to a Buddhist deity. The kuji may have arrived in Japan via Buddhism, where it flourished within Shugendō. Here too, each word in the kuji was associated with Buddhist deities, animals from Taoist mythology, and later, Shinto kami. The mudrā, a series of hand symbols representing different Buddhas, was applied to the kuji by Buddhists, possibly through the esoteric Mikkyō teachings. The yamabushi ascetics of Shugendō adopted this practice, using the hand gestures in spiritual, healing, and exorcism rituals. Later, the use of kuji passed onto certain bujutsu (martial arts) and ninjutsu schools, where it was said to have many purposes. The application of kuji to produce a desired effect was called "cutting" (kiri) the kuji. Intended effects range from physical and mental concentration, to more incredible claims about rendering an opponent immobile, or even the casting of magical spells.

== See also ==
- Kunoichi
- Ninjas in popular culture
