= Shōkaku-ji (Fukuoka) =

Buddhist temple in Fukuoka, Japan

Coordinates: 33°31′38.3″N 130°22′11.8″E

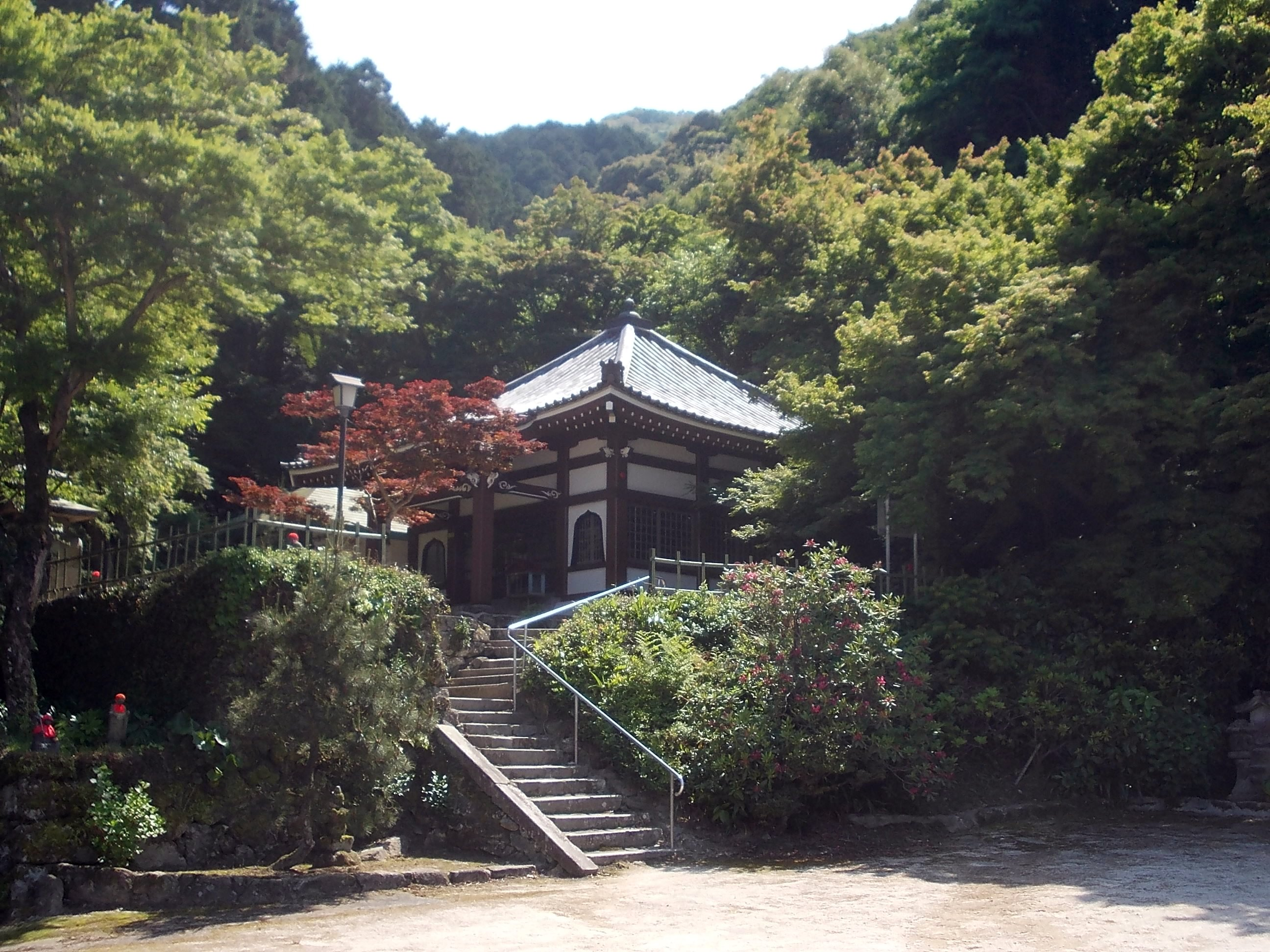
Shōkaku-ji in Jōnan-ku, Fukuoka

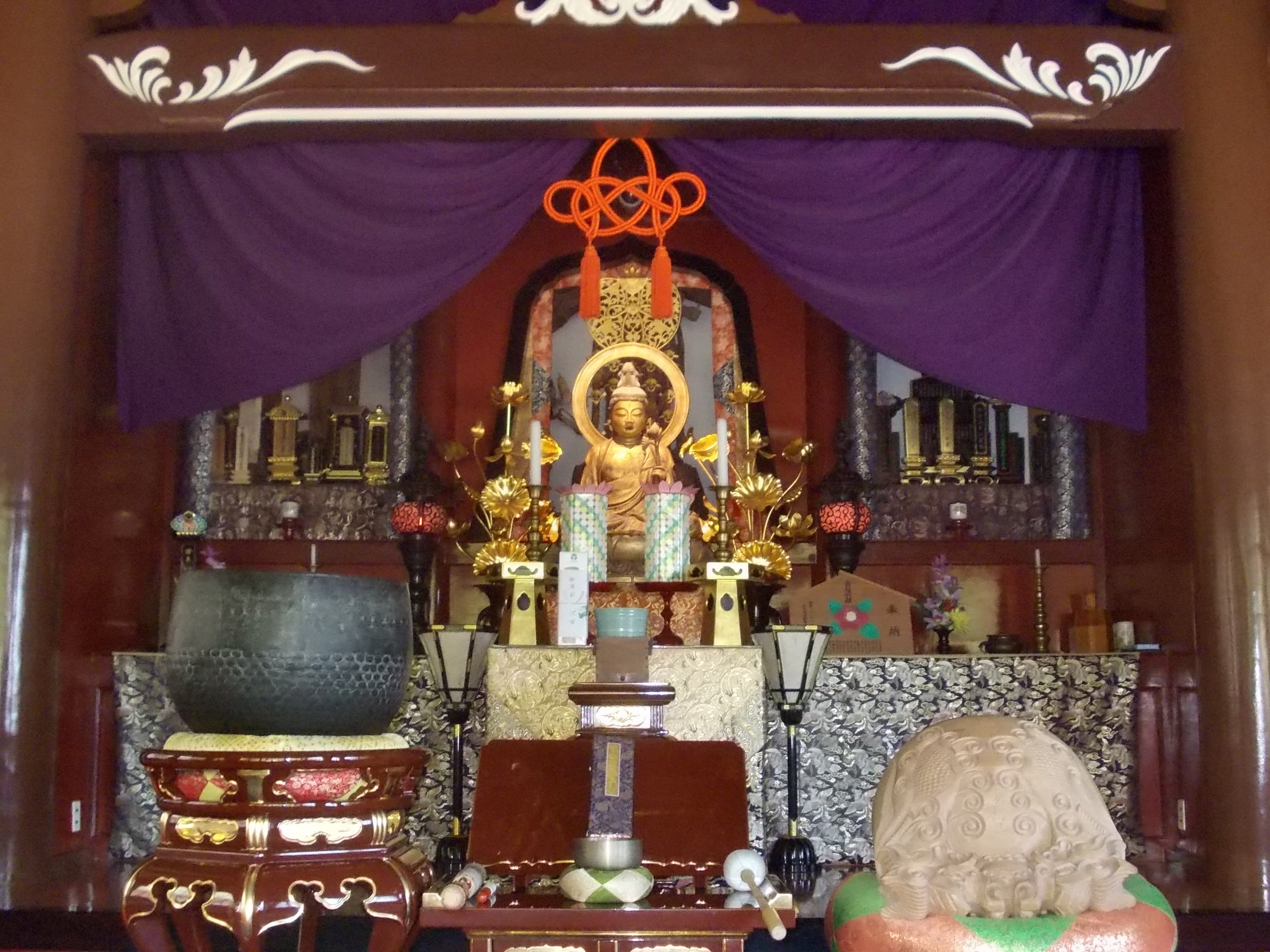
The wooden Avalokiteśvara statue in the main hall

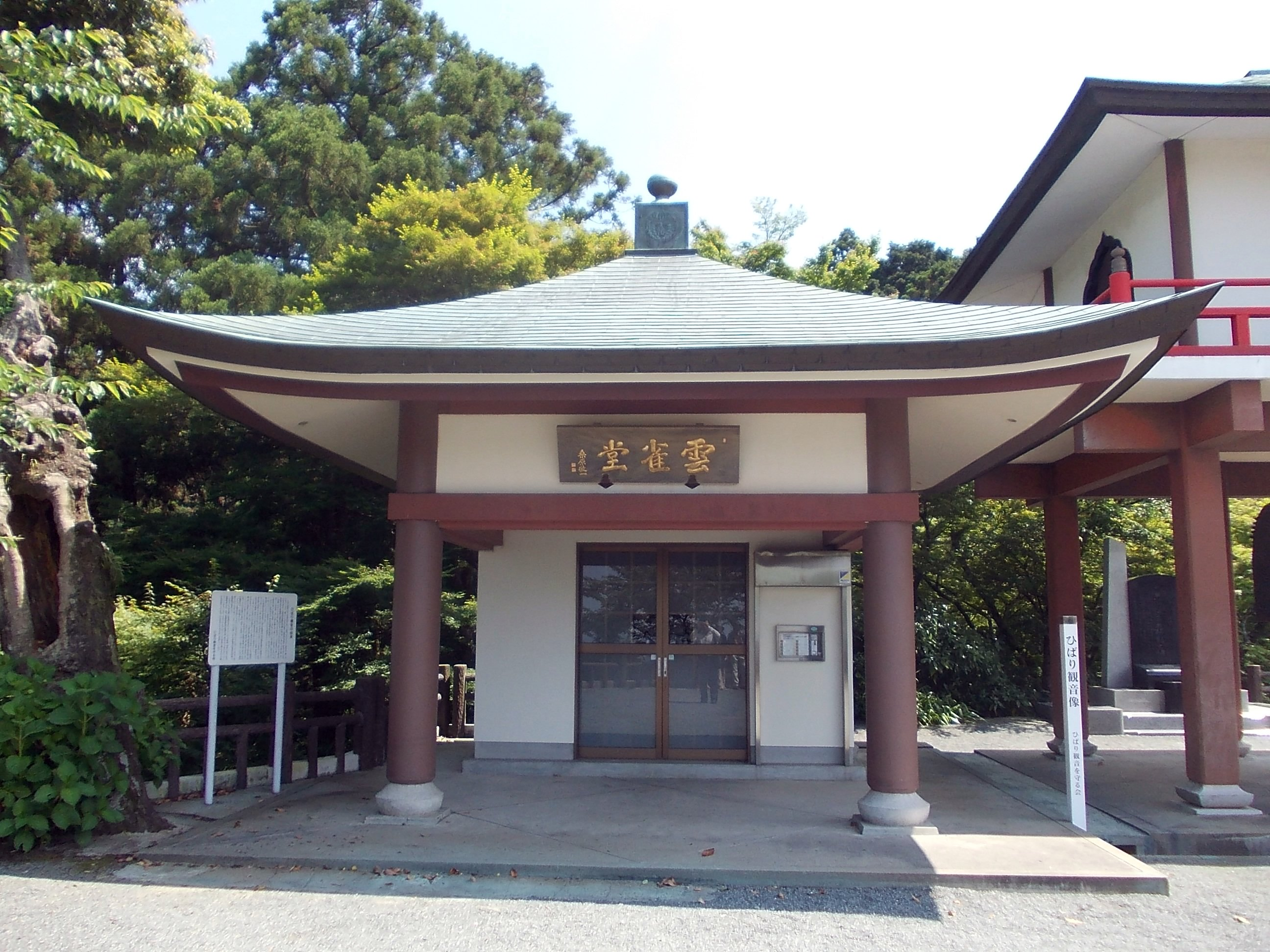
The Hibari Kannon-dō Hall

Shōkaku-ji (正覚寺) is a Rinzai temple in Jōnan-ku, Fukuoka, Japan. Its honorary sangō prefix is Higashiaburayama (東油山). It is also known as Aburayama Kannon (油山観音).

Shōkaku-ji was founded during the Nara period by Seiga, a priest who came from India. He established a Buddhist hermitage and discovered white camellias on the mountain. He harvested them and created a pair of Bodhisattva Kannon statues, enshrining one in this temple. It is believed that the first process of extracting kerosene in Japan was by squeezing oil from camellia seeds. Both the name of Mount Abura and the temple have origins related to this process. Originally, it was named Senpuku-ji (泉福寺).

In 1193, Bencho, a priest of the Chinzei branch of Jōdo-shū Buddhism, entered the temple and taught his disciples there. Along with the Tenpuku-ji Temple on the mountain's west side, Shōkaku-ji became a flourishing center for monks, with up to 360 priest living quarters surrounding the temple. However, during the Tenshō era, the temple was destroyed by a fire resulting from war. It was later rebuilt during the Genroku era, with the construction of various buildings such as the kannon-dō hall, the reception hall, a bell tower, living quarters, and others. In 1694, the temple was renamed Shōkaku-ji.

The wooden Avalokiteśvara statue, enshrined in the main hall, has been an object of significant religious reverence. It was designated a Cultural Property of Japan by the government in 1906. On October 4, 2009, a theft of the Buddha statue occurred. The thief entered the temple and stole the statue from the main hall. However, the statue was recovered in December of the same year. Shoe marks left behind indicated that multiple criminals were involved, and it is believed they broke into the main hall by cutting the padlock.

The Hibari Kannon-dō hall, built in 1994, was dedicated to Hibari Misora, a Japanese singer who died on June 24, 1989.

The Aburayama porridge opening ceremony is held every year on February 1. Based on the state of the red bean porridge left in the main hall for 15 days from the Lunar New Year, this event predicts the weather and crop conditions for the upcoming year.

== Important Cultural Properties ==
The 78-meter wooden Avalokiteśvara statue dates back to the Nanboku-chō period.
