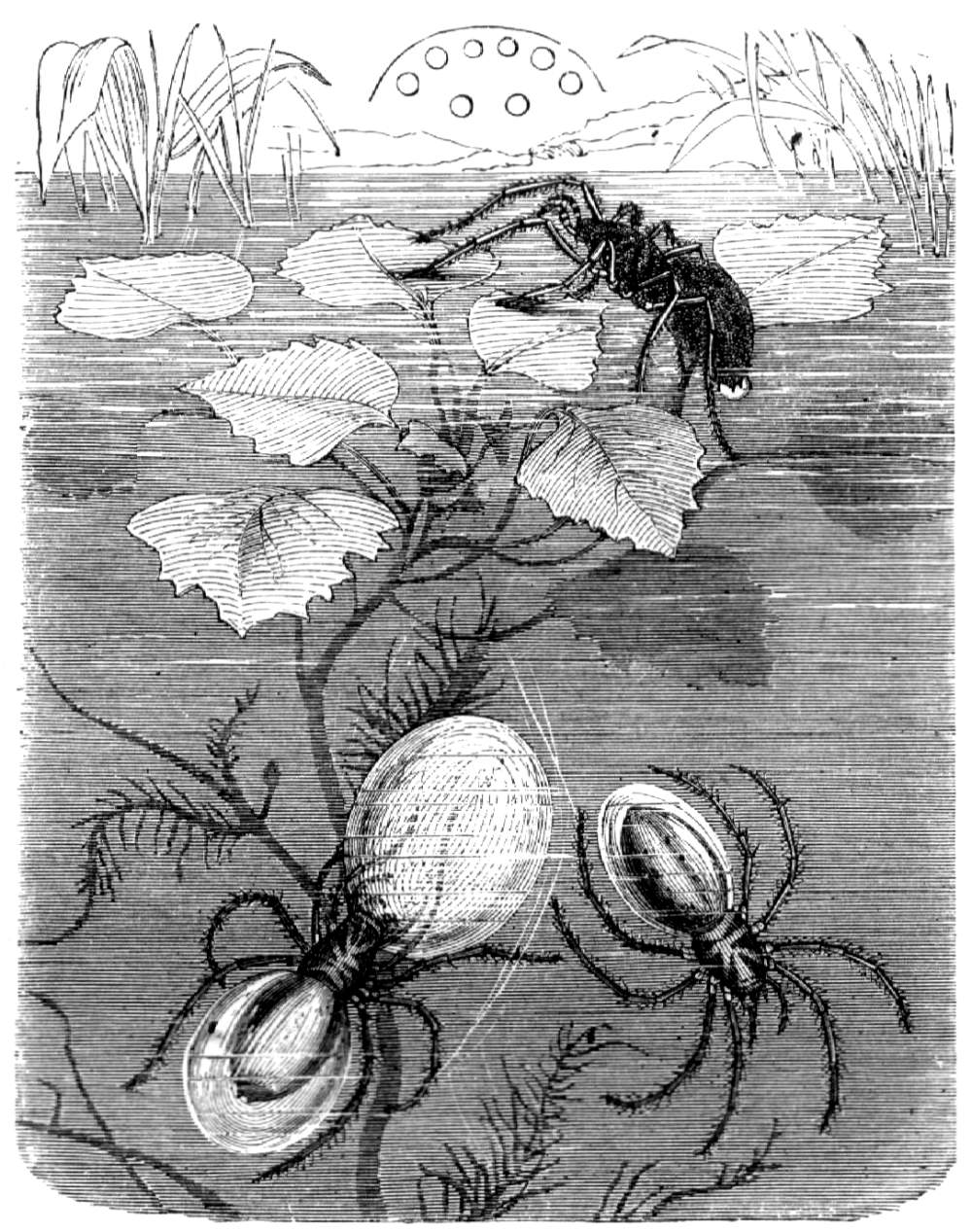
- Picture from Brehms Tierleben by Brehm, 1884.

Scientific classification
- Domain: Eukaryota
- Kingdom: Animalia
- Phylum: Arthropoda
- Subphylum: Chelicerata
- Class: Arachnida
- Order: Araneae
- Infraorder: Araneomorphae
- Family: Dictynidae
- Genus: Argyroneta
- Species: A. aquatica
- Subspecies: A. a. japonica

Trinomial name
- Argyroneta aquatica japonica Ono, 2002

= Japanese water spider =

Subspecies of spider

The Japanese water spider (Argyroneta aquatica japonica) is a subspecies of the water spider. In Japanese it is called the mizugumo. The Japanese water spider is almost exactly like its European cousin. The only distinction between the two is that the Japanese water spider has larger genitalia. Like its cousin, the Japanese water spider lives under water by constructing diving bells, underwater spheres which contain oxygen, which they live in.

== The creation of a subspecies ==
In 2002 Hirotsugu Ono proposed that the Japanese water spider be hitherto known as a subspecies of the water spider. Ono had collected Japanese specimens of the water spider and found that species in Europe and Japan differed:

An infraspection classification is herewith proposed mainly on the basis of a slight difference in the shape of male palp recognized between specimens from Europe and Japan.

Ono proposed the new subspecies because the Japanese male's palp, or genitalia, is longer than the European male's palp. The Japanese female's genitalia are also larger than the European female's genitalia.

== Habitats in Japan ==
According to T. Matsumoto the Japanese water spider has been "found in …the Mizoro Pond in Kyoto Prefecture, Kiritappu, [the] Kusiro swamp, Teshio, [the] Sarobetu swamp in [the] Hokkaido prefecture, Syarki village in Aomori prefecture, [and the] Oita prefecture." All of these habitats are "isolated geographically."

== Behavior ==
Males and females are different in many ways. Males rove frequently, searching for prey and for mates. Females, however, spend the majority of their lives inside their diving bells; they ambush their prey. Males are better divers than females. Females and juveniles are active during the night, while males are active during the daytime. The young do not balloon like other spiders do, rather, they leave their nest and find their new homes by swimming.

== Mating ==
The Japanese water spider is unusual in that males are almost always larger than females. This is called sexual size dimorphism (SSD). When water spiders mate the male begins by approaching the female's diving bell. He then chases her out of the diving bell and they begin "courtship swimming." They then return to the female's diving bell to mate.

== Silk and construction ==
The Japanese water spider spins four main kinds of silk: (1) silk used for the diving bell, (2) silk to anchor the diving bell to water plants, (3) silk for "walking" so as to get prey and mate, and (4) silk for the egg-cocoon. The diving bell silk is "used for breathing," that is it serves to oxygenate the diving bell. Females produce larger diving bells than males. Males build their diving bells less carefully than females do. Males also frequently make more walking threads than females.

Females weave the egg-cocoon into the top of the diving bell. The egg-cocoon is made up of two parts. The outer is the cocoon-sac and the inner part is the egg sack.

== Other ==
=== Argyronetidae vs. Cybinidae ===
There has been some debate amongst arachnologists as to whether the water spider (A. a. aquatica) belongs to the family Cybinidae or Argyronetidae. In this article the Japanese water spider (A. a. japonica) is listed as being in the family Argyronetidae, because the subspecies authority, Hirotsugu Ono, chose to place it in this family.

=== The Anime Short Film ===
In 2006 Hayao Miyazaki produced a short film titled "Mizugumo Monmon". The film's main character is a Japanese Water Spider, named Monmon, who falls in love with a water skimmer. The water skimmer is at first frightened of him, but eventually she falls in love with him. The film is only shown in Miyazaki's Ghibli Museum. The target audience for the film is children.
