= Bujinkan =

International martial arts organization

Bujinkan (武神館)
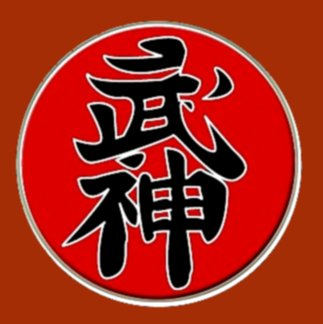
- The Bujinkan Logo
- Date founded: c. 1972
- Country of origin: Japan
- Founder: Masaaki Hatsumi
- Current head: Masaaki Hatsumi
- Arts taught: Bujinkan Budō Taijutsu
- Ancestor schools: • Gyokko-ryū kosshijutsu • Kotō-ryū koppōjutsu • Shinden Fudō-ryū dakentaijutsu • Takagi Yōshin-ryū jūtaijutsu • Kukishinden-ryū Happō bikenjutsu • Gikan-ryū koppōjutsu • Togakure-ryū ninpō • Gyokushin-ryū ninpō • Kumogakure-ryū ninpō
- Official website: http://www.bujinkan.com

The Bujinkan (Japanese: 武神館) is an international martial arts organization based in Japan and headed by sōke Masaaki Hatsumi. The combat system taught by this organization comprises nine separate ryūha, or schools, which are collectively referred to as Bujinkan Budō Taijutsu (武神館武道体術). The Bujinkan is most commonly associated with ninjutsu. However, Hatsumi prefers the term budō (武道, lit. 'martial way') as he describes the ryūha as descending from both historical samurai and ninjutsu traditions.

== Schools ==
Bujinkan Budō Taijutsu brings together the nine martial lineages that Hatsumi learned from Takamatsu Toshitsugu. They are:

- Togakure-ryū Ninpō (戸隠流忍法)
- Gyokushin-ryū Ninpō (玉心流忍法)
- Kumogakure-ryū Ninpō (雲隠流忍法)
- Kotō-ryū Koppōjutsu (虎倒流骨法術)
- Gyokko-ryū Kosshijutsu (玉虎流骨指術)
- Kukishinden-ryū Happō Bikenjutsu (九鬼神伝流八法秘剣術)
- Shinden Fudō-ryū Dakentaijutsu (神伝不動流打拳体術)
- Takagi Yōshin-ryū Jūtaijutsu (高木揚心流柔体術)
- Gikan-ryū Koppōjutsu (義鑑流骨法術)

Around the time of his 88th birthday (beiju (米寿)) on 2 December 2019, Hatsumi named his successors as heads of the nine schools:

- Togakure-ryū: Tsutsui Takumi
- Gyokushin-ryū: Kan Jun'ichi
- Kumogakure-ryū: Furuta Kōji
- Kotō-ryū: Noguchi Yukio
- Gyokko-ryū: Ishizuka Tetsuji†
- Kukishinden-ryū: Iwata Yoshio
- Shinden Fudō-ryū: Nagato Toshirō
- Takagi Yōshin-ryū: Sakasai Norio
- Gikan-ryū: Sakasai Norio

== Training ==
Bujinkan training does not include competitions or contests. Instead, it aims to develop the ability to protect oneself and others by disabling an attacker, or removing their ability or will to continue, as quickly and efficiently as possible.

Practice is done in pairs. One partner (uke) attacks and receives the technique, and the other (tori) applies it, as in judo and other traditional Japanese martial arts. Unlike many traditional martial arts, however, Bujinkan training progresses through the following stages:

- Prearranged sequences of movement (kata), together with physical conditioning.
- Variations on those sequences (henka), adapting to changes in the attacker's movements or the situation.
- Free-form practice (randori), made up mostly of spontaneous, dynamic techniques in which the defender strikes, locks, chokes or throws the attacker in a controlled and safe way.
- At advanced levels, controlling the attacker's mind through methods such as pain compliance and deception.

Training is conducted so as to keep the risk of permanent injury low.

The Bujinkan has no official rule set restricting the actions or techniques used in training. Because its aim is surviving dangerous situations rather than winning a competition or an evenly matched duel, its methods include pain compliance and potentially damaging techniques. As a result, many standard Bujinkan responses would be unsuitable for most competitions, although the principles behind them can still be applied in a ring.

A common criticism of Bujinkan training is that it does not necessarily involve testing techniques (locks, throws, chokes, strikes and so on) against a fully resisting opponent. Practitioners respond that this depends on the individual instructor and student. The Bujinkan is practiced by members of law enforcement, government agencies, the military, military contractors and private security.

The Bujinkan largely focuses on "taijutsu" (body movement / skills) as well as other skills of ninjutsu (ninpō tactics and strategies) and happō bikenjutsu (various modern and traditional weapons) – the latter being the focus of Bujinkan's branch of Kukishin-ryū.

=== Taijutsu ===
Taijutsu is the Bujinkan's system of unarmed combat, using strikes, throws, holds, chokes and joint locks. It is divided into four areas, each named after the unarmed art of the schools that specialize in it:

- Koppōjutsu (骨法術, lit. 'bone method art') attacks the opponent's bones. It also exploits skeletal structure, both the practitioner's own and the opponent's. It is the speciality of Kotō-ryū and Gikan-ryū.
- Kosshijutsu (骨指術, lit. 'bone finger art') attacks the muscles and other weak points of the body rather than the bones. It is the speciality of Gyokko-ryū, and Gyokushin-ryū is considered a style of it.
- Jūtaijutsu (柔体術, lit. 'supple body art') covers throwing, joint locks, choking and grappling, and relies on a relaxed, flexible body rather than strength. It is the speciality of Takagi Yōshin-ryū.
- Dakentaijutsu (打拳体術, lit. 'striking fist body art') covers striking, kicking and blocking. It is the speciality of Shinden Fudō-ryū.

The first levels of training, such as leaping, tumbling, breakfalls and body conditioning, form the foundation of taijutsu. Students need them before progressing to unarmed combat and the use of tools and weapons. Once learned, taijutsu techniques can be applied to any situation, armed or unarmed.

The word taijutsu (体術) literally means "body skill". Historically in Japan it was often used interchangeably with jujutsu and similar terms for a range of grappling skills. In aikido, it distinguishes unarmed techniques from armed ones such as stick fighting. In ninjutsu, especially since the rise of ninja films, the term has been used to avoid referring explicitly to "ninja" combat techniques.

==== Tori and uke ====
Training begins with partners practicing prearranged forms (waza or kata) before moving on to unlimited variations of those forms (henka). The tori, the person applying the technique, initiates it against the uke, the person who receives it.

==== Ukemi and balance ====
Bujinkan taijutsu relies on body movement and positioning rather than strength. Every technique involves unbalancing the opponent while keeping one's own balance, by moving the opponent into weak positions and manipulating their body along lines where it is hard to resist. The attacker constantly tries to regain balance and cover vulnerabilities, such as an exposed side. Meanwhile, the defender uses position and timing to keep the attacker off balance and exposed. In more advanced training, the attacker will sometimes use reversal techniques (返し技, kaeshi-waza) to regain balance and disable the defender.

Ukemi (受身) is the skill of receiving a technique safely, usually by rolling or breakfalling to avoid pain or injury such as a dislocated joint. Learning to roll and breakfall well is therefore essential to safe training in taijutsu. Before receiving 9th kyū, the first grade, a student must show that they can roll smoothly in a variety of directions without exposing the neck to injury.

=== Physical conditioning ===
Jūnan taisō (jūnan meaning "flexible") is a yoga-like method of stretching and breathing that Bujinkan practitioners use to develop and maintain physical condition and well-being. The exercises promote relaxation, circulation, muscle tone and flexibility. They are a core part of every training session, preparing the body for practice. All the major joints are rotated and stretched while the practitioner focuses on breathing and concentration.

== History ==
=== Founding and growth ===
Hatsumi began training under Toshitsugu Takamatsu at the age of 27, travelling every week from Noda, Chiba Prefecture to Takamatsu's home in Kashihara, Nara Prefecture. He studied with him for about fifteen years, until Takamatsu's death in 1972, and inherited from him the headship of the nine schools. Hatsumi founded the Bujinkan in his late thirties, to pass these arts on to a new generation; a 2015 profile published by the Cabinet Office gives the year as 1970. Its headquarters (honbu dōjō) is in Noda, near Atago Station.

The Bujinkan became known outside Japan in the late 1970s and 1980s. Western students such as Stephen K. Hayes, who trained with Hatsumi in Japan in the 1970s and wrote a series of books on ninjutsu in the 1980s, introduced his art abroad at a time when ninja films were highly popular. Hatsumi first taught in the United States in the early 1980s. He began teaching abroad in his fifties, and over the following 25 years travelled to more than 50 countries.

By the 2000s, the Bujinkan had about 100,000 practitioners worldwide, and most of the students training at the Noda dōjō were foreigners. Hatsumi has said he does not know how many students he has had; estimates of former and current students run from 300,000 to 500,000. Senior instructors (dai-shihan) teach in many countries, so many practitioners are students of Hatsumi's students rather than of Hatsumi himself. Hatsumi has been made an honorary citizen of Los Angeles, Atlanta and other cities.

Several of Hatsumi's senior students later founded their own organizations. Shoto Tanemura founded the Genbukan in 1984, Fumio Manaka founded the Jinenkan in 1996, and Hayes developed To-Shin Do in 1997.

In December 2019, around his 88th birthday, Hatsumi appointed separate heads for each of the nine schools (see Schools).

=== Lineage of the schools ===
Almost all of the Bujinkan's schools are listed, with their historical lineages, in the Bugei Ryūha Daijiten (Encyclopedia of Martial Art Schools). It was compiled by Watatani Kiyoshi and Yamada Tadashi and first published in 1963. Since 1968, four years before Takamatsu's death, the encyclopedia has included Hatsumi after Takamatsu in these lineages.

Several Bujinkan ryūha are mentioned in the Kakutōgi no Rekishi (History of Fighting Arts). Without going into detail, it says that "there are several schools that are well-known for being 'effective arts' (jitsuryoku ha)". The schools it lists in this section include Gyokko-ryū, Gikan-ryū, Gyokushin-ryū, Kukishin-ryū and Takagi Yōshin-ryū. It also lists Asayama Ichiden-ryū, which is not one of the Bujinkan's nine schools but which Hatsumi studied under Takashi Ueno.

Several of the samurai schools taught by Hatsumi, such as Kukishinden-ryū and Takagi Yōshin-ryū, have well-documented lineages, and other branches of these arts survive under their own sōke. Ninjutsu is different. Although the activities of the ninja are well documented, the nature of the art and its historical context mean that no written records of ninjutsu teachings survive from before 1676. Some researchers therefore argue that the oral lineage of the Togakure-ryū tradition cannot be independently verified.

The Bugei Ryūha Daijiten gives the full lineage of Togakure-ryū as follows: "The succession is an oral tradition from Toda Shinryūken. Toda Shinryūken Masamitsu died in 1908 at the age of 90 years. According to the lineage, Ikai originated the school, and in the Yōwa period (1181–1182), it separated from Hakuun Dōshi of Hakuun-ryū and became the Kōga and Iga schools of ninjutsu. The lineage passed through Momochi Sandayū and entered into the Natori-ryū of Kishū domain. From the time of Toda Nobutsuna, the tradition was passed on to the Toda family. This genealogy refers to dates and kuden (orally transmitted stories/lessons) about people implying that these people were older than written records would suggest."

Its entry on Gyokko-ryū reads: "Receiving the tradition of Gyokko-ryū Shitojutsu from Sakagami Taro Kunishige of the Tenbun era, Toda Sakyo Ishinsai established Gyokko-ryū Kosshijutsu as well as Kotō-ryū Koppōjutsu, passing them on to Momochi Sandayu, bringing them within the traditions of Iga-ryū Ninjutsu of Toda Shinryuken who lived during the end of the Tokugawa Shogunate. It is said that Toda Shinryuken died in the 14th year of the Meiji Emperor (1881) at the age of 90 years."

Its entry on Kotō-ryū reads: "The genesis of koppōjutsu is said to have been in ancient China. Kotō-ryū was brought to our country by a Chan Bushou of Korea, after this it was brought within the traditions of Iga-ryū Ninjutsu, and its revitalization in the Tenbun era is said to have been from Momochi Sandayu inheriting the tradition from Toda Sakyo Ishinsai (oral tradition from Toda Shinryuken)."

=== Yearly themes ===
Since 1988, Hatsumi has given his teaching a particular theme each year, which he announces at the Daikōmyōsai. The theme is usually a particular ryū, or a set of techniques drawn from a particular ryū. Students who trained in Japan in different years may therefore emphasize different material. This is one reason the techniques of different Bujinkan teachers often differ noticeably. Although ninpō taijutsu is an overarching theme of the Bujinkan, 2008 was the first year in which one of the ninpō schools was the focus. Before founding the Bujinkan and teaching the nine schools together, Hatsumi awarded rank certificates in individual schools. The themes have been:

- 2019 – Mutō dori (continued)
- 2018 – Mutō dori (continued)
- 2017 – Mutō dori
- 2015 – Nagamaki
- 2014 – Shin In Bu Dō (神韻武導): shin, "god" or "spirit"; in, "resonance" or "elegance"; bu, "martial"; dō, "leading" or "guiding"
- 2013 – Ken Engetsu no Kagami ("mirror of the full-moon sword") and Tachi Hōken ("divine treasure sword"): tachi and katana; naginata and yari
- 2012 – Jin Ryo Yo Go (kaname): sword and rokushakubō, separately and with one in each hand
- 2011 – Kihon happō
- 2010 – Rokkon shōjō
- 2009 – Sainō konki (才能魂器), "talent, soul, capacity" (see below)
- 2008 – Togakure-ryū ninpō taijutsu
- 2007 – Kukishin-ryū
- 2006 – Shinden Fudō-ryū
- 2005 – Gyokko-ryū kosshijutsu (bō and tachi)
- 2004 – Daishō jūtaijutsu (Roppō Kuji no Biken)
- 2003 – Juppō sesshō
- 2002 – Jūtaijutsu (Takagi Yōshin-ryū)
- 2001 – Kosshijutsu (Gyokko-ryū)
- 2000 – Koppōjutsu (Kotō-ryū)
- 1999 – Kukishinden-ryū
- 1998 – Shinden Fudō-ryū
- 1997 – Jōjutsu
- 1996 – Bokken
- 1995 – Naginata
- 1994 – Yari
- 1993 – Rokushakubōjutsu
- 1992 – Taijutsu power
- 1991 – Sword and jutte
- 1990 – Hanbō
- 1989 – Taijutsu and weapons
- 1988 – Taijutsu

No single school or weapon was announced for 2009. Instead, Hatsumi spoke about three qualities important to a martial artist, which he said would become something of a theme for the following year: sainō (talent), kokoro (heart) and utsuwa (capacity). Soon afterward, he proposed replacing kokoro with tamashii (soul). He reasoned that the heart is constantly changing, whereas the soul is permanent and unchanging and therefore "essential to the person".

== Ninpō ==
=== Gyokushin-ryū Ninpō ===
Gyokushin-ryū Ninpō ("The Jeweled Heart School") is taught by the Bujinkan martial arts organization. According to the Bujinkan, Gyokushin Ryu has sutemi waza techniques and is focused more on the art and techniques of espionage than on fighting. Its most prominent weapon is the lasso (nagenawa). The Bugei Ryuha Daijiten states that Takamatsu Toshitsugu transferred the Gyokushin-ryū Ninpō to Hatsumi in the middle of the 20th century, making Hatsumi its 21st sōke. Gyokushin-ryū Ninpō is taught today in the Bujinkan organization. According to the Bujinkan martial arts organization, Gyokushin-ryū was founded in the mid-16th century by Sasaki Goeman Teruyoshi, who was also sōke of Gyokko-ryū, which explains the similarities between the two styles. Gyokushin-ryū is considered a style of koshi jutsu.

=== Togakure-ryū ===
According to Bujinkan members, Ninja Jūhakkei (the eighteen disciplines) were first identified in the scrolls of Togakure-ryū (戸隠流), or the "School of the Hidden Door", founded during the Oho period (1161–62) by one Daisuke Nishina (Togakure), who learned a life view and techniques (ninjutsu) from Kagakure Doshi. Togakure-ryū Ninjutsu Hidenshō is a manuscript in Hatsumi's possession that is said to document Togakure-ryū. It is the purported origin of the "18 skills of Ninjutsu".

Ninja jūhakkei was often studied along with bugei jūhappan (the 18 samurai fighting art skills). Though some techniques were used in the same way by both samurai and ninja, others were used differently by the two groups. The 18 disciplines are:

1. Seishinteki kyōyō (spiritual refinement)
2. Taijutsu (unarmed combat)
3. Kenjutsu (sword techniques including Tojutsu)
4. Bōjutsu (stick and staff techniques)
5. Sōjutsu (spear techniques)
6. Naginatajutsu (naginata techniques)
7. Kusarigamajutsu (kusarigama techniques)
8. Shurikenjutsu (throwing weapons techniques)
9. Kayakujutsu (pyrotechnics)
10. Hensōjutsu (disguise and impersonation)
11. Shinobi-iri (stealth and entering methods)
12. Bajutsu (horsemanship)
13. Sui-ren (water training)
14. Bōryaku (tactics)
15. Chōhō (espionage)
16. Intonjutsu (escaping and concealment)
17. Tenmon (meteorology)
18. Chi-mon (geography)

== Uniforms and rankings ==
=== Kyū levels ===
The Bujinkan has a series of kyū grades below shodan (first dan). New students start unranked (mukyū, "without grade") and progress from kukyū (9th kyū), the lowest grade, to ikkyū (1st kyū), the highest. Unranked students wear white belts, kyū-grade students wear green belts (men) or red belts (women), and those of shodan and above wear black belts. In some dojos, especially in children's classes, kyū-grade students wear other colored belts, with the colors varying from place to place.

In Japan it was once customary for men below shodan to wear green belts over a black training uniform (ninjutsugi), and for women to wear red belts over a purple one. The purple uniform has largely been abandoned. In most dojos, men and women now both wear black uniforms, with green or red belts respectively. On their feet they usually wear tabi: soft-soled tabi for indoor training and jika-tabi for outdoor training.

=== Dan levels ===
There are ten dan grades in the Bujinkan, and the tenth (jūdan) is divided into five further levels. Apart from fifth dan (see below), there are no fixed criteria for promotion. Each dojo takes its own approach, shaped by the local culture and the instructor's preferences.

Progression from 9th kyū to shodan is typically guided by the Ten Chi Jin Ryaku no Maki ("Scrolls of Heaven, Earth and Man"), which cover all the fundamental techniques needed for later study. Up to fourth dan, students are expected to build strong foundations and perfect their form. From fifth dan, the focus shifts to responding naturally in dynamic and increasingly challenging situations.

To reach fifth dan (godan), a fourth-dan practitioner must pass the sakki test (also called the godan test) before the sōke. The test establishes whether they can sense danger and evade it, which is considered a fundamental survival skill. A practitioner who passes is considered to be under the protection of the Bujin (guiding spirits) and may apply for a teaching license (shidōshi menkyo). A shidōshi (士道師) may open their own Bujinkan dōjō and grade students up to fourth dan. A practitioner between first and fourth dan may become a licensed assistant instructor (shidōshi-ho) if backed by, and working under the supervision of, a shidōshi. Practitioners of tenth dan and above are often called shihan.

A practitioner's rank is shown by the color of the Bujinkan emblem, the wappen (ワッペン), which bears the kanji bu (武) and jin (神). There are four kinds of wappen: for kyū grades, for 1st–4th dan, for 5th–9th dan, and for 10th dan and above. Some are supplemented with up to four silver, gold or white stars (hoshi) above or around the emblem to mark individual ranks. The five levels above 10th dan are named chi, sui, ka, fū and kū.

Besides the kyū/dan system, a few practitioners hold menkyo kaiden ("license of complete transmission") in individual schools or specific areas of study. It certifies that the holder has learned everything there is to learn in that lineage or subject. Whereas kyū and dan ranks are often made public, holders of menkyo kaiden rarely disclose it, and are sometimes reluctant even to tell outsiders their dan rank.

Bujinkan grades
Kyū grade	Name	Dan grade	Name	Menkyo grade	Name	Teacher grade	Title
10th kyū	Mukyū/Jūkyū	1st dan	Shodan	11th dan	Chigyō Menkyo	1st dan+	Shidōshi-ho
9th kyū	Kukyū	2nd dan	Nidan	12th dan	Suigyō Menkyo	5th dan+	Shidōshi
8th kyū	Hachikyū	3rd dan	Sandan	13th dan	Kagyō Menkyo	10th dan+	Shihan
7th kyū	Shichikyū	4th dan	Yondan	14th dan	Fūgyō Menkyo	15th dan	Dai-shihan
6th kyū	Rokukyū	5th dan	Godan	15th dan	Kūgyō Menkyo		
5th kyū	Gokyū	6th dan	Rokudan				
4th kyū	Yonkyū	7th dan	Shichidan				
3rd kyū	Sankyū	8th dan	Hachidan				
2nd kyū	Nikyū	9th dan	Kudan				
1st kyū	Ikkyū	10th dan	Jūdan				

== Criticism of historical claims ==
The historical accuracy of the Bujinkan's lineage claims, particularly for Togakure-ryū, has been questioned on the basis of successive editions of the Bugei Ryūha Daijiten. They say the following of Takamatsu's Togakure-ryū:

- The 1963 edition states that "this genealogy refers to various written records and oral transmissions and there are many points/places where embellishments have been added and people appearing in the genealogy are also made older than they actually are".
- The 1969 edition describes it as "a genealogy newly put together by Takamatsu Toshitsugu, who made use of (took advantage of) the popularity of written materials on ninjutsu after the Taishō era". It adds that "there are many points where it has added embellishments, it has made people whose real existence is based on written records older than is actually the case, and so it is a product of very considerable labor".
- The 1978 edition states that the "genealogy includes embellishments by referring to data and kuden about persons whose existence is based on written materials and traditions in order to appear older than it actually is".

Watatani questioned whether there was enough evidence that Togakure-ryū had been an unbroken tradition since the 12th century, but he did not doubt that it predated the Meiji period.
