= Togakure-ryū =

Japanese ninjutsu martial arts school

Togakure-ryū (戸隠流) is a historical tradition of ninjutsu known as the "School of the Hidden Door", allegedly founded during the Oho period (1161–1162) by Daisuke Nishina (仁科大助) (a.k.a. Daisuke Togakure (戸隠大助)), who learned his original fighting techniques from a Chinese monk named Kain Dōshi. However, the history and early lineage of Togakure-ryū may be impossible to verify due to the antiquity of the time period and its claimed historicity has been disputed by Watatani Kiyoshi, writer for the Bugei Ryūha Daijiten. After Togakure, the title of Sōke (head of school) was recorded by Toda Shinryuken Masamitsu to have been passed down through other practitioners that kept the style secret from the outside world.

Toshitsugu Takamatsu is the recorded 33rd Sōke of this school. According to Bujinkan sources he became well known throughout China and Japan for his martial arts prowess and his knowledge from studying ninjutsu that he then imparted on various Chinese nobles. Takamatsu passed the title of Sōke to Masaaki Hatsumi, the recorded 34th Sōke; it was Hatsumi who largely brought the style to public attention, and subsequently resulted in wide-scale media and public attention given to ninja and ninjutsu in the Western world. Hatsumi recently passed on the school to Takumi Tsutsui.

The style of Togakure-ryū has been described by its practitioners as having less-restrictive training regimens, which encourage individual personal training. One of the main goals of the training is to develop shin shin shingan (English: god's eyes or god's mind) so that they can learn to properly know their opponents and defend themselves.

The Bugei Ryūha Daijiten has claimed that embellishments were made to the history of the Togakure-ryu, changing the age of things to make the school appear older than it is. This was not uncommon in many Japanese lineages, as many Densho and Makimono scrolls were either partly destroyed or completely destroyed by the constant bombing of Japan during world war two.

== History ==
According to Bujinkan researcher Glenn Morris, Togakure-ryu originated in the Mie Prefecture with its creator, Daisuke Nishina. Morris explains that it was started in 1162, as a way of fighting in the war between the Genji and Heike (Taira) clans. The style itself would go on to be known as the origin of ninjutsu and its various fighting styles. Nishina was a samurai and a member of the Genji clan, which had been staging a revolt against the Heike clan because of their oppression of the Genji people. The revolt, however, was crushed and Nishina fled his home village of Togakure in Shinano Province to save his children.

Hatsumi Masaaki indicates that Nishina then changed his name to Togakure to reflect where he had come from and settled in the forests on the Kii Peninsula in the Iga Province. This account claims that it was there that Nishina met Kain Dōshi, a warrior-monk who had been politically exiled from China. From Kain, Togakure learned the fighting styles of China and Tibet and put aside his samurai code (bushidō). Hatsumi has stated that Togakure's first successor was his son, Rokosuke, and that Togakure also trained a deshi (English: apprentice) called Shima, who would become the third master of the style after Rokosuke.

According to Hatsumi, since historical times, the Togakure-ryū style was passed down through the years until mastership was granted to Shinryuken Toda, the 32nd Sōke of Togakure-ryū. He began teaching the style to his grandson, Toshitsugu Takamatsu, since Takamatsu was five in 1893. When he turned 19, Takamatsu was announced as the next successor of the Togakure-ryū style, becoming the 33rd Sōke. After this pronouncement, Takamatsu decided to spend a year meditating in the "mountains between Kyoto and Nara". Upon his return, he set out again, this time to China where he spent time in the courts of nobles as an important adviser because of his extensive knowledge from his ninja training. It is stated by Hatsumi that because of a series of incidents that occurred throughout China, Takamatsu became infamous throughout the region by the age of 25. When he turned 28, he was elected as the "Head of Japanese martial arts in China".

Bujinkan sources indicate that Takamatsu became known throughout China and Japan for his martial-arts abilities and from his ninjutsu knowledge that he imparted to various Chinese nobles. Passing on the title of Sōke to Masaaki Hatsumi (the stated 34th Sōke) it was Hatsumi who took the style public, which has resulted in the high amount of media and public attention on ninjas in the Western world. Masaaki also went on to found the Bujinkan, an international martial arts organization, in Noda, Chiba. The group combines modern Togakure-ryū and the eight other martial-arts styles.

As of 1986, there were 20 dojos for Togakure-ryū in Japan that housed 100 instructors and around 100,000 students. There were also around 50 international dojos teaching Togakure-ryū outside Japan.

=== Lineage ===
As stated by the Bujinkan organization, the lineage in the line of Sōke (grand masters) of Togakure-ryū, beginning with Daisuke Togakure, is as follows:

1. Daisuke Togakure (1162)
2. Shima Kosanta Minamoto no Kanesada (1180)
3. Goro Togakure (1200)
4. Kosanta Togakure
5. Kisanta Koga
6. Tomoharu Kaneko
7. Ryuho Togakure
8. Gakuun Togakure
9. Koseki Kido
10. Tenryu Iga
11. Rihei Ueno
12. Senri Ueno
13. Majiro Ueno
14. Saburo Iisuka
15. Goro Sawada
16. Ippei Ozaru
17. Hachiro Kimata
18. Heizaemon Kataoka
19. Ugenta Mori
20. Gobei Toda
21. Seiun Kobe
22. Kobei Momochi
23. Tenzen Tobari
24. Seiryu Nobutsuna Toda (1624–1658)
25. Fudo Nobuchika Toda (1658–1681)
26. Kangoro Nobuyasu Toda (1681–1704)
27. Eisaburo Nobumasa Toda (1704–1711)
28. Shinbei Masachika Toda (1711–1736)
29. Shingoro Masayoshi Toda (1736–1764)
30. Daigoro Chikahide Toda (1764–1804)
31. Daisaburo Chikashige Toda (1804)
32. Shinryuken Masamitsu Toda (born 1824 – died 1909)
33. Toshitsugu Takamatsu (born 1887 – died 1972)
34. Masaaki Hatsumi (born 1931)
35. Takumi Tsutsui (born 1964)

== Style ==
As a ninjutsu tradition influenced by the samurai martial arts of the Sengoku period, the style of Togakure-ryū consists of a small number of physical escape and evasion techniques, called ninpo taijutsu, and a series of sword attack patterns, or biken kata. However, the majority of the art involves techniques of geography, meteorology, swimming, signaling, potion-making, fire-starting, concentration, disguise, impersonation, and other forms of knowledge suited for the unique information-gathering and infiltration roles of ninja.

Togakure-ryū's ninpo taijutsu is described as being "fundamentally different" from other styles of Japanese martial arts that are currently taught. This is largely because, unlike these other styles, Togakure-ryū does not have a "tightly regimated [sic] organizational structure." The Bujinkan teaches that while Togakure-ryū contains some "historical kata", which are similar to the training in judo and aikido in that they require an opponent to attack and initiate the movements. Much of the "formality" that other styles contain is not present in modern Togakure-ryū. Stephen K. Hayes explained that it is likely this "freer, more flexible structure" that makes it different, as the style has an atmosphere where "questions are encouraged, but there isn't one part answer for every question."

Modern Togakure-ryū resembles other martial-arts in the "footwork and dynamics" that all styles utilize because of the nature of human movement. Hayes stated that a main goal of the style is shin shin shin gan (English: god's eyes, god's mind), which refers to the "development of a broad vision or knowledge" to anticipate the moves that an opponent will make and to also be able to sense danger.

== Weapons ==
The Bujinkan organization teaches that the original Togakure-ryū utilized many special weapons. One was the shuko, which is a "spiked iron band worn around the hand". It enabled the wearer to use it as a defense against sword attacks and also to reach higher terrain, as it could be used to climb trees or walls, especially when worn with similar devices for the feet called ashiko. Additionally, the tetsubishi (a type of caltrop) was a "small spiked weapon used to slow pursuers or protect doorways". The third was the kyoketsu-shoge, a blade from a double-bladed spear that was tied to a length of rope with an iron ring at the other end for the wielder to hold. In addition to use as a weapon, it could be used to "wedge open a door, climb into a tree or over a wall, or tie up an opponent".

== Training areas ==
There are 18 training areas that modern Togakure-ryū focuses on. The areas are constantly updated to remain relevant to modern threats that practitioners will need to face. The Togakure ryu Ninjutsu Hidensho is a Japanese manuscript written by Takamatsu, in the possession of Masaaki Hatsumi, that documents modern Togakure-ryū. The document is purported to contain the origin of the "18 Skills of Ninjutsu". Modern Togakure-ryu is taught in the syllabi of the Bujinkan, Genbukan, Jinenkan, Gi Yu Kyo Kai, Jinkage Ryu, and To-Shin Do.

The training areas include:

- Seishinteki kyōyō (spiritual refinement)
- Taijutsu (unarmed combat)
- Kenjutsu (sword)
- Bōjutsu (stick and staff fighting)
- Shurikenjutsu (throwing blades)
- Yarijutsu (spear fighting)
- Naginatajutsu (polearm fighting)
- Kusarigama (chain and sickle weapon)
- Kayakujutsu (fire and explosives)
- Hensōjutsu (disguise and impersonation)
- Shinobi-iri (stealth and entering methods)
- Bajutsu (horsemanship)
- Sui-ren (water training)
- Boryaku (strategy)
- Chōhō (espionage)
- Intonjutsu (escape and concealment)
- Tenmon (meteorology)
- Chimon (geography)

== Criticism of historical claims ==
Modern Togakure-ryu and various historical claims are taught by Masaaki Hatsumi (Takamatsu's successor) and the Bujinkan organization. Criticism regarding the historical accuracy of the Bujinkan's claims of lineage have arisen from several issues of the Bugei Ryūha Daijiten:

- The 1978 version of the Bugei Ryūha Daijiten states that Takamatsu's Togakure-ryu "genealogy includes embellishments by referring to data and kuden about persons whose existence is based on written materials and traditions in order to appear older than it actually is."
- The 1969 version of the Bugei Ryūha Daijiten states that Takamatsu's Togakure-ryu "is a genealogy newly put together by Takamatsu Toshitsugu, who made use of (took advantage of) the popularity of written materials on ninjutsu after the Taishō era" and that "there are many points where it has added embellishments, it has made people whose real existence is based on written records older than is actually the case, and so it is a product of very considerable labor".
- The 1963 version of the Bugei Ryūha Daijiten states of Takamatsu's Togakure-ryu "this genealogy refers to various written records and oral transmissions and there are many points/places where embellishments have been added and people appearing in the genealogy are also made older than they actually are".
