= Sekai Ninja Sen Jiraiya =

1988–89 Japanese television series

- Title card
- Also known as: Jiraiya and the Ninja Olympiad
- Genre: Tokusatsu; Superhero fiction
- Created by: Saburō Yatsude
- Developed by: Akira Nakahara
- Directed by: Makoto Tsuji
- Starring: Takumi Tsutsui; Megumi Sekiguchi; Takumi Hashimoto; Masaaki Hatsumi; Issei Hirota; Tomoko Taya; Hiromi Nohara
- Voices of: Shōzō Iizuka
- Narrated by: Tōru Ōhira
- Theme music composer: Kisaburo Suzuki
- Composer: Kei Wakakusa
- Country of origin: Japan
- No. of episodes: 50

Production
- Running time: 25 minutes
- Production companies: Toei Company; Asatsu-DK

Original release
- Network: TV Asahi (ANN)
- Release: January 24, 1988 – January 22, 1989

Related
- Choujinki Metalder; The Mobile Cop Jiban

Jiraiya and the Ninja Olympiad (世界忍者戦ジライヤ, Sekai Ninja Sen Jiraiya; lit. "World War Ninja Jiraiya") is a Japanese television series that aired on TV Asahi and its affiliates from January 24, 1988, to January 22, 1989, lasting 50 episodes. It was the seventh installment in Toei's Metal Hero Series franchise of live-action superhero shows and the last of the Showa era. The series centers around a young ninja master named Toha Yamaji, who must face numerous ninja masters from different parts of the world by donning a special armor to become his alter-ego Jiraiya.

The English title given by Toei's international sales department is Ninja Olympiad, a reference to the Seoul Olympics and the Calgary Olympics that was held at the time the series was airing.

== Story ==
Tetsuzan Yamaji is the 34th grandmaster of the Togakure Ryū Ninpō, sworn to guard a stone tablet detailing the location of an artifact of untold power called the Pako which came to Earth. But a fallen disciple of Togakure Ryū Ninpō named Dokusai stole one-half of the tablet years prior and established the Sorcerers Clan to steal the rest. Besides his daughter Kei and her younger brother Manabu, Tetsuzan entrusts their clan's sacred duty to make friends with Toha while bestowing the Jiraiya Suit that has been in their family for generations. As Jiraiya, Toha faces the Sorcerers Clan along with numerous ninjas gathering from around the world to acquire the Pako for their own agendas.

== Characters ==
=== Yamaji Family ===
The Yamaji Family (left from right: Tetsuzan, Toha [Jiraiya, at the bottom], Manabu, and Kei [Emiha])

The Yamaji Family (山地族, Yamaji-ke) are the main characters of the series, descendants of Togakure-ryū (戸隠流), an ancient ninja order whose duty is to protect the Inscription, a piece of stone that reveals the location of Pako, a capsule that fell from space somewhere in Japan in 300 B.C., said to be the most valuable treasure in the world.

- Toha Yamaji (山地 闘破, Yamaji Tōha)/Jiraiya (磁雷矢 (ジライヤ); Magnetic Thunder Arrow): The protagonist. The 19-year-old (46 years old in Ninninger) adoptive son of Tetsuzan Yamaji. He has been given the task of protecting the Yamaji's half of the clay tablet showing the location of the Secret Treasure Pako. To become Jiraiya, he wears the Jiraiya Suit and wields the deadly Optical-magnetized Light Vacuum Sword (磁光真空剣, Jikō Shinkū Ken) to defeat evildoers. He later gains the ability to upgrade his Jiraiya Suit by equipping over it the Jiraiya Power Protector. He works several part-time jobs to support his family. Toha is actually a descendant of the alien that brought the Pako to Earth 2300 years before the start of the series. He was adopted by Tetsuzan when he was an infant after his true parents, Hanzo (半蔵, Hanzō) and Chiyo (千代), were killed. Decades after the Sorcerers Clan's fall, Toha makes a guest appearance in episode 34 of Shuriken Sentai Ninninger. He later appoints a successor, Touma Amagi (天城 闘真, Amagi Touma), who inherits his suit and appears in Uchu Sentai Kyuranger vs. Space Squad.
- Kei Yamaji (山地 ケイ, Yamaji Kei)/Princess Ninja Emiha (姫忍 恵美破, Himenin Emiha): Tetsuzan's daughter, a 16-year-old high school freshman. She often teases her adoptive brother Toha, leaving most of the housework and chores to him, but cares deeply about him. When she dresses as Emiha to assist Jiraiya, she wears a white ninja armor similar to Jiraiya's. Her special technique, the Cherry Blossoms Rain Ninja Art (忍法花吹雪, Ninpō Hanafubuki), allows her to put enemies to sleep with a rain of white cherry blossoms. Her other technique, the Face Copying Ninja Art (忍法顔うつし, Ninpō Kao Utsushi), allows her to create face masks of other people to disguise herself.
- Manabu Yamaji (山地 学, Yamaji Manabu): Tetsuzan's young son, a 9-years-old third grade student. He becomes dissatisfied with himself after feeling that his older siblings and father treat him as being only half-capable as they are. He eventually creates a homemade battle armor as he becomes more involved in the war against the Sorcerers Clan, wielding a slingshot with steel marbles as his main arsenal. He is also a talented artist when it comes to drawing portraits. Manabu makes a guest appearance in episode 31 of Kidou Keiji Jiban.
- Tetsuzan Yamaji (山地 哲山, Yamaji Tetsuzan): The 34th Grandmaster of the Togakure-ryū Ninpō school. The adoptive father of Toha and biological father to Kei and Manabu. His wife Sanae (早苗) was the daughter of Tetsuzan's master, but she was killed during a crossfire between Tetsuzan and the Sorcerers Clan eight years prior to the start of the series (when Manabu was an infant). He opened the Bujinkan (武神館) ninpo dojo at his own apartment complex, but has received very few students outside his own children. He raises Bonsai trees at his spare time and owns two pets: Shiro (シロ), a carrier pigeon; and Kuro (クロ), a ninja-trained canine. One of his most notable characteristics is his great knowledge of the World Ninjas.

=== International Secret Police ===
The Yamaji Family are assisted by a pair of secret agents from the International Secret Police (国際秘密捜査官, Kokusai Himitsu Sōsakan), who are assigned to apprehend various criminals from around the world.

- Rei Yagyu (柳生 レイ, Yagyū Rei)/Valorous Ninja Reiha (貴忍 麗破, Kinin Reiha) - A mysterious kunoichi descended from the Shadow Yagyu clan. She holds a secret power which she releases when her pupils glow green and uses a ninjato. Like Toha, she is descended from the alien that brought Pako to Earth, thus she is the only person whose blood type is compatible with Toha's. In Episode 11 she overuses her power and suffers a memory loss as a result, but she eventually recovered when was almost being killed by Dokusai, in the episode 24.
- Ryu Asuka (飛鳥 竜, Asuka Ryū)/Spear Ninja Toppa (槍忍 突破, Yarinin Toppa) - A young spear-wielding ninja who works together with Rei. He was played by Issei Hirota, who previously played Akira/Blue Mask in Hikari Sentai Maskman. In the end of the episode 24, the narrator says that Ryu Asuka has accepted a mission and would left Japan for a short time, even though he will never more be seen in the show.

=== Allies ===
- Castle Ninja Baron Owl (城忍 フクロウ男爵, Jōnin Fukurō Danshaku): A British ninja descended from a Crusader who is a devout Christian, dressed like a knight in a golden helmet who rides a white horse named Juji-Go (十字号, Jūji-Gō). He wields a broadsword called the Cross King Sword (十字王剣, Jūji Ō Ken), as well as crucifix-shaped shurikens. While he sought the Pako in memory of those who died for their faith, he becomes Jiraiya's ally.
- Jail Ninja Haburamu (牢忍 ハブラム, Rōnin Haburamu): A mohawk and black mask-donning Turkish ninja who is a devout Muslim with a preference of sleeping outdoors due to his loud snoring, tasked with the protection of the Green Flame, a precious emerald from the Topkapi Palace. Wields a large knife and sword, as well as a Kusari-fundo. In Episode 3, he is tricked into fighting Jiraiya by the Sorcerers Clan, but reconciles with him by the end of the episode. In Episode 15, he inadvertently releases Manin Sylvia from her prison and returns to Japan to seek Jiraiya's assistance.
- Anthropomorphic Ninja Scarlet Lizard (異形忍 紅トカゲ, Igyōnin Beni Tokage): A wandering ninja who collects valuable swords, his mastery of various sword fighting skills and ninjutsu making himfeared by even Dokusai himself. He wields lizard-shaped throwing stars and bombs, as well as a hand cannon, while having the ability to transform into a large lizard. In Episode 5, he attempts to challenge Jiraiya for the Optical-magnetized Light Vacuum Sword, but fails. He becomes Jiraiya's ally and in Episode 31, he discovers the Nobutora, a sword that belonged to Shingen Takeda, that was stolen from a museum in Paris, but is forced to return it to authorities. In Episode 41, he becomes possessed when he wields the Dark Sword that originally belonged to Demost.
- Explosive Ninja Rocket Man (爆忍 ロケットマン, Bakunin Rokettoman): An American ninja who specializes in explosives and gunpowder. Wields a rocket launcher, which he usually carries on his back and wields a dagger for close-combat. However, he is not adept at close-quarters combat. A Vietnam War veteran, he decided to flee from the conflict after he encountered a young girl named Tao (タオ) whose parents were killed. He faked his death and adopted Tao as his own daughter. In Episode 14, he goes to Japan for the first time in order to clear his name after the Sorcerers Clan framed for a bombing and kidnapping he didn't commit. In Episode 44, he is forced to fight Jiraiya against his will when Tao is kidnapped by the Sorcerers Clan. After Tao is rescued, he returns alongside Mafuuba and Wild in order to assist Jiraiya in the final battle against the Sorcerers. His ninja mask is a conical hood resembling a rocket.
- Lightning Ninja Wild (雷忍 ワイルド, Rainin Wairudo): An American ninja from the West descended from Billy the Kid. He works as a bounty hunter and calls himself the "Ninja Sheriff from Lincoln's Union Army". His ninja outfit is made of blue denim. Wields a Magnum revolver along with a knife. In Episode 20, he hunts down Jiraiya in order to collect the bounty offered by the Sorcerers Clan, but joins forces with Jiraiya in the end when the Sorcerers betrays him. Afterward, he begins working for a public entertaining company in order to collect money to pay for his trip back to America and ends up challenging Jiraiya again in Episode 33 to duel. From that point onward, he becomes one of Jiraiya's recurring ally in the battle again the Sorcerers Clan.
- Holy Ninja Alamsa (聖忍 アラムーサ, Seinin Aramūsa): A member of the Holy Ninja Clan, a religious clan that inhabit the desert lands. Wields a large katana and a knife. He has several Ninpo skills such as creating a Sand Blizzard that seals his enemies' weapons in sand, throwing stars that feeds from certain energy sources, the ability to levitate giant objects, and so on. The red stone on his head is the source of his powers. He is ignorant of modern society due to his upbringing. In Episode 21, he is tricked by the Sorcerers Clan into blackmailing the Governor of Tokyo and stealing all of the gasoline in Tokyo, but he is taught the errors of his way by Jiraiya and becomes his ally. In Episode 47, he is brainwashed by Madam Spider into destroying Jiraishin, but he comes to his senses before he could accomplish such a task.
- Treasure Ninja Jeanne (宝忍 ジャンヌ, Hōnin Jannu): A fortune-telling half-Japanese female ninja from Canada who seeks to help her poor hometown. She can shoot a Diamond Shower from her chest. Demost uses her good intentions against her by forcing her to lead Jiraiya to a trap, but ended up saving him instead by giving up her own life.
- Paper Ninja Oruha (紙忍 折破, Kaminin Oruha): A ninja who can manipulate paper, he is employed by his own clan to hunt down deserters. He first appears in Episode 12, where he is assigned to hunt down a deserter named Mimura (三村). However, he is reluctant to finish job, having had a romantic relationship in the past with Mimura's daughter Kasumi (カスミ). After Mimura is killed, Oruha abandons the clan to elope with Kasumi. He retires and moves to Yamanakako with Kasumi, but is brought back into action in Episode 26 after becoming involved in a plot by the Sorcerers Clan. He has ability to create paper doll minions and uses dismantled scissors as throwing knives. In Episode 45, he and Kasumi are both killed by his former clan leader, but they are both brought back to life by the powers of Jiraishin.
- Flower Ninja Yumeha (花忍 夢破, Hananin Yumeha): A female ninja apprentice from the Flower Ninja Clan, a clan from Lake Hamana which branched off from the Togakure school. She was raised by the clan's leader Genichiro Murakami (村上源一郎, Murakami Genichiro) as his own after being abandoned by her birth parents when she was an infant. She was given the task of preventing the cursed armor of the Devil King from falling into the wrong hands. She has the ability to use falling flower petals as weapons, as well as the small branches from cherry blossom trees. She is assisted by Jiraiya in Episodes 17 and 18, and returns in Episode 32 to team up with Emiha and Reiha.
- Wind Ninja Mafuuba (風忍 馬風破, Kazenin Mafūba): After the Special Ninja Team was defeated, the Sorcerers Clan revived Kaze by turning him into a cyborg ninja. Mafuuba has all abilities from his deceased Special Ninja Team comrades in addition to his own, while fully overcoming his phobia of strong winds. He wields a pistol and sword cane and rides an enhanced motorcycle known as the Shadow Mach (シャドーマッハ, Shadō Mahha), which rivals the performance rate of Jiraiya's Black Saber. Although an enemy of Jiraiya at first, he was unable to tolerate the injustices committed by the Sorcerers and departed from the group to become Jiraiya's ally. The name "Mafūba" translates "Destroying Wind Horse".
- Henry Rakuchin (ヘンリー 楽珍, Henrī Rakuchin): A comical fortune teller who gets himself involved with the activities of Toha and co. Although he was trained to become a ninja, he gave up and ran away from his master's place. Has a one-sided crush on Mei.
- Dr. Smith (スミス博士, Sumisu-hakase): An American scientist who was also Tetsuzan's first disciple. He defected to Japan with the help of Tetsuzan, fearing the way his research was being used for the "Star Wars Project". He dreams of combining his scientific technology with the ways of Ninpō to help protect the world. In his first appearance in Episode 11, he repairs and improves the Jiraiya Suit after it was damaged in battle by Chang Kung-Fu Jr. and Lu Long, building the Power Protector upgrade parts as well. In Episode 16, he takes Toha's beloved car and rebuilds it into the Black Saber. When he was kidnapped by Gamesh alongside his colleagues Dr. Brown and Dr. Schmidt in Episode 23, he managed to escape using a Ninpō trick taught to him by Tetsuzan. He also wielded a fountain pen equipped with a laser gun that alters an enemy's brainwaves.
- Yajiro Iyo (伊予 野二郎, Iyo Yajirō): Appears in Episode 27 played by Metal Hero veteran Kenji Ohba. A skilled warrior formerly from the Togakure school who seeks to challenge the best, he is known for his unpredictable behavior. He lives in the city of Matsuyama at Shikoku, but is asked by Tetsuzan to visit Tokyo in order to discourage Toha from becoming too arrogant. He does so by challenging Toha to an unarmed match for the ownership of the Jiraiya Suit and the Optical-magnetized Light Vacuum Sword. After being defeated by Yajiro, Toha goes through an intensive training program in order to defeat him. Toha learns a new skill that allows to blank out his mind and augment his entire body's senses in order to better predict attacks. Toha defeats Yajiro in the rematch and reclaims his armor and sword.
- Catherine (カトリーヌ, Katorīnu): Appears in Episodes 29, 31 and 40. A French policewoman and ninja who travels to Japan undercover as a tourist in order to recover the Nobutora Sword, which was stolen by Parchis from a museum in Paris.

=== The Sorcerers Clan ===
The Sorcerers Clan (left from right: Oninin Dokusai, Chuunin Benikiba and Hoshinin Retsukiba)

The Sorcerers Clan (妖魔一族, Yōma Ichizoku) are the main antagonists of the series led by the patriarch Dokusai. They possess half of the Inscription which contains the location of Pako (with the other half being with the Yamaji).

- Ogre Ninja Dokusai (鬼忍 毒斎, Oninin Dokusai): The leader of the Sorcerers Clan, whose true face is concealed with an Oni mask. He was formerly a student of the Togakure school who trained alongside Tetsuzan before he his greed compelled him to steal the clay map, escaping with one half and establishing the Sorcerers Clan. He begins to demonstrate his true powers from Episode 37 and onward, as he shows various skills such as shooting ray of lights from his arms or confusing Jiraiya by changing his face to that of Tetsuzan's. He was revealed to be entirely faceless during the final episode.
- Butterfly Ninja Benikiba (蝶忍 紅牙, Chōnin Benikiba): Dokusai's daughter. A master of disguises who can assume the shape of any person, from a young schoolgirl to Toha himself. Her special technique is the Sorcerer Ninja Art Restless Butterfly (妖魔忍法乱れ蝶, Yōma Ninpō Midare Chō). She surrenders and escapes during the final battle. The name "Benikiba" translates to "crimson fang".
- Star Ninja Retsukiba (星忍 烈牙, Hoshinin Retsukiba): A young ninja from the Sorcerers Clan who spearheads its frontline activities. He can shoot rays of light from the cross-shaped shuriken on his mask, as well as produce fire through sorcery. He is also a skilled archer. Just like Benikiba, he surrenders and escapes alive in the end. The name "Retsukiba" means "Violent Fang". His most and only notable performance occurred at the first episode of the series, in a climactic battle against Jiraiya.

The Torinin Karastengu

- Bird Ninjas Karasutengu (鳥忍 カラス天狗, Torinin Karasutengu): Bird-like underlings of the Sorcerers Clan who work primarily in groups of three. Their weapons include caltrop bombs and dart-shooting blowguns. They're easily defeated in battle due to being incredibly weak. They fly by making a breaststroke-like gesture. They always end their phrases with the onomatopoeia "yansu".
- Witch Ninja Madam Spider (妖忍 クモ御前, Yūnin Kumo Gozen): A female ninja closely acquainted with Dokusai who can change between two different human forms (a "front" form and a "rear" form) or into a spider. She first appears in Episode 37. She uses weapons such as spider-shaped bombs and electric discharging spider-web and even has the magic powers to summon the souls of deceased World Ninjas into the living world. Her regular human form is known as her "front form", while the one she uses as a public disguise is her "rear form". She has a flirtatious, but respectful relationship with Dokusai.
- Special Ninja Team (特殊忍者群, Tokushu Ninjakun): An elite group of five ninjas chosen by the Sorcerers Clan in Episode 16. Each member is named after a different element: Fire (火, Hi), Water (水, Mizu), Land (土, Tsuchi), Wood (木, Ki) and Wind (風, Kaze). Each member has a skill which utilizes the elements they're named after: Hi can engulfed his whole body in flames and throw fireballs; Mizu can swim in high speed in water and use high water pressure in his attacks; Ki can turn himself into wood and ram himself into the enemy; Tsuchi can launch attacks from underground; and Kaze can rush attack in high-speed by surrounding his body in a tornado, as well control the wind itself. Kaze is afraid of the sound of raging winds due to the fact that he lost his parents on a night with strong winds. He studied his art with the hopes of overcoming his fear, which proves unsuccessful when the group fought Jiraiya.
- Killer (キラー, Kirā) and Comando (コマンド, Komando): Two South American mercenaries employed by the Sorcerers Clan during Episodes 34 and 35. Killer wields a kusarigama, while Comando uses a shotgun and a long spear.
- Sorcerer Behemoth Gohma (妖魔巨獣ゴーマ, Yōma Kyōjū Gōma): A giant beast that Dokusai managed to revive using a wicked magical skull in Episodes 34 and 35. He brandishes a spear and fires out flames from his mouth when angry.

=== Demost ===
Space Ninja Demost (宇宙忍 デモスト, Uchuunin Demosuto) is an alien who serves as the main antagonist for the series finale, originating from the Dark Planet (暗黒星, Ankoku-sei) before being sealed underground at Mount Kongō by Jiraiya's ancestor around the 4th century B.C. But Demost is released due to a change in the Earth's crust caused by Jiraishin's resurrection, plotting to acquire the Pako and use its power to return to his homeworld. Demost later appears in Uchu Sentai Kyuranger vs. Space Squad as a member of the Genmaku cult, using the Neo Kyutamas in an attempt to take over the Kyurangers' universe and offer it to Guru Fumein. But he is defeated by the Kyurangers and the Star Sheriffs, ending up in the latter group's custody.

Demost can detach his head from his body and float in the air, as well as be restored after being destroyed once. He can attack and bind his enemies with electric shocks from his hands and his face, as well as read his opponent's mind. He also acquires the Dark Sword (暗黒剣, Ankoku Ken), a laser blade equivalent to Jiraiya's in terms of strength.

=== Enemy Ninjas ===
- Shapeshifting Ninja Parchis (化忍 パルチス, Kenin Paruchisu): A free-agent ninja master of disguises who cooperates with the Sorcerers Clan in Episodes 19 and 22. In Episode 31, he steals the treasured Nobutora Sword from a museum in Paris in cooperation with a group of international thieves, but his plot is foiled by Jiraiya. He cooperates with the Sorcerers Clan again in Episodes 40 and 48 before he is defeated for good.
- Fire Ninja Chang Kung-Fu (火忍 チャンカンフー, Kanin Chan Kan Fū): A 90-year-old ninja from Hong Kong who can control fire. In Episode 4, he cooperates with the Sorcerers Clan in order to obtain the Pako for the purpose of achieving eternal youth and immortality. His weapons include a Ninjatō, a kusarigama, a nunchaku, and a three-sectioned staff. He wraps his opponents with his kusarigama, as well as attacks them with his illusionary flames. He also has a special skill called the Art of the Three Illnesses (三病の術, San'ya no Jutsu), which causes his opponent to take him lightly, over-analyze the situation and then fill the opponent with fear. After Chang Kung-Fu is defeated, his son seeks revenge on Jiraiya in Episodes 10 and 11. The son, in addition to having the same outfit and abilities as his father, uses a specially prepared type of Ramen noodles from Hong Kong that ties the mobility of his opponents.
- Chinese Ninja Lulong (漢忍 緑龍, Kannin Ryokuryū): A member of a drug cartel from Hong Kong who cooperates with the Sorcerers Clan in Episodes 10 and 11. He has a grudge against Toppa for interfering in his deals in the past. He is a master of the Drunken Fist who wields a Green Dragon Blade and a nunchaku. He can distract his adversaries with his illusions while striking continuously with his nunchaku, as well as create a "flame dragon" that attacks with its claws and illusionary flames. He defeated Jiraiya with the help of Chang Kung-Fu's son during their first battle, but both are defeated during the second battle. Voiced by Eisuke Yoda with stunt acting by Tsutomu Kitagawa. The name Lulong means "Green Dragon" in Chinese.
- Beast Ninja Macumba (獣忍 マクンバ, Jūnin Makunba): A ninja employed by a guerrilla group from Kenya. In Episode 7, he becomes involved in a smuggling operation with Japan's Miyamura Commercial Affairs, trading the furs of animals he has poached for weapons. He was responsible for the death of Jou, a beloved student of Tetsuzan who was also the chief of the African Wildlife Poaching Control. When the Yamaji Family receives news of Jou's death, Jiraiya decides to challenge Macumba, becoming involved with the Miyamura corporation as well. After being defeated by Jiraiya, Macumba's older brother (獣忍 マクンバの兄,, Jūnin Makunba no Ani) appears in Episode 25 to seek revenge. With the help of the Sorcerers Clan, Macumba's brother captures several animals and causes them to shriek loudly in front of the statue of the evil African god Dada. This causes Macumba's spirit to be brought back to life and challenge Jiraiya.
- Strong Ninja Abdad (剛忍 アブダダ, Gōnin Abudada): A ninja from the fictional Democratic Republic of Amel (アメール民主共和国, Amēru Minshu Kyōwakoku) who appears in Episode 8. He is the uncle of a young girl named Maira, who was chosen to serve as peace ambassador on behalf of Amel. He plots the assassination of his niece in order to turn Amel back into a dictatorial monarchy. Not wanting to kill his elder brother's daughter with his own hands, he hires the Sorcerers Clan to do the deed by paying them with a 100-carat (20 g) diamond. His weapons includes a dagger and a double-barreled handgun. He also uses a ninpo technique that allows him to cause large explosions with a mysterious type of powder. His ninja mask is a turban that wraps his entire face.
- Miraculous Ninja Strowver (灼忍 ストローボ, Shakunin Sutorōbo): First appears in Episode 43. He once challenge Tetsuzan for the title of world's best ninja, but lost his right arm in the ensuing battle. After the battle, he replaced his missing arm with a prosthetic one and began to train to seek revenge on Tetsuzan. He decides to do so by targeting Toha. His Art of the Miraculous Light (灼光の術, Shakukō no Jutsu) causes his opponents to become blind by shooting them with one million volts of flashing lights from the chest of his golden armor. After Jiraiya becomes blind from his technique, the only thing that can cure him is the root of a red Yamayuri flower that grows only in Mount Kumotori.
- Kurozaru (黒猿): Appears in Episodes 17 and 18. A member of the Flower Ninja Clan, he was raised by the clan's master after being orphaned as a child similarly to Yumeha. However, he became corrupt and conspired with half of the clan to conquer the world, assassinating his former master in the process. He seeks the Devil King armor in a cave near to Lake Hamana to achieve his ambition, but becomes possessed after wearing it, with Dokusai claiming him as Demonic Ninja Kurokiba (魔忍黒牙, Manin Kurokiba), but dismissed, as Kurozaru wanted to dominate even the Sorcerers Clan and ends up fighting Jiraiya.
- Sound Ninja Uha (音忍 宇破, Otonin Uha): A surviving member of the cruel Sound Ninja Clan who dresses like a Komusō. He cooperates with the Sorcerers Clan to seek revenge on the Togakure school for destroying his clan. When he plays his shakuhachi, he can control his adversary with his People Controlling Ninja Art (忍法人操り, Ninpō Hito Ayatsuri), as well as cause an illusionary group of ninjas to appear within a fog with his Demon World Encampment Secret Art (秘術魔界陣, Hijutsu Makai Dan). Although he is defeated by Jiraiya, he is brought back to life by Dokusai in Episode 32 and begins summoning ghosts at the beach dormitory of the Saint Mariana Girl School in order to lure out a powerful psychic girl and bring her under his control.
- Water Ninja Silva Shark (水忍 シルバーシャーク, Suinin Shirubāshāku): An assassin descended from a Caribbean pirate who swims the seas in search of riches. He specializes in underwater combat and wields a harpoon gun. In Episode 24, he cooperates with the Sorcerers Clan in search of Captain Cook's treasure. He returns in Episode 40 to cooperate with the Sorcerers Clan alongside Parchis, but is caught in one of Gamesh 002's traps. He returns again in Episode 48, where he is defeated for good.
- Devious Ninja Black Thorn (邪忍 黒い茨, Janin Kuroi Ibara): Appears in Episode 30. A young shinobi who was raised and trained by the ancient ninja master Gensai Koshimura (越村玄斎, Koshimura Gensai). Despite being trained by Koshimura to be a champion of justice, being the one who gave Black Thorn his name, Black Thorn rejected his master's values after his mother's death and turned to a life of crime by becoming a bank robber, believing that he could've saved his mother's life if he had money. Presumed dead after a fight with his former master, he returns four years later to plot revenge on Koshimura by framing him for various bombing and blackmailing incidents against the Government. He uses rose thorns as weapons.
- Paper Ninja Clan Leader (紙忍一族頭領, Kaminin Ichizoku Tōriyō): Appears in Episode 45. The cold-blooded leader of Oruha's ninja clan, turning his clan into an assassin group to kill people for gold. He cooperates with the Sorcerers Clan to seize Oruha and Kazumi for deserting the clan. Has the ability to transform himself into a dragon using a Whirlwind Technique (竜巻の術, Tatsumaki no Jutsu).
- Feast Ninja Gyuma (祭忍 ギュウマ, Sainin Gyūma): A ninja from Cambodia who seeks to defeat Jiraiya in order to become the world's best ninja and obtain the Pako board. He can shoot an electric shock from his horn. He can create underlings from his own colorful cloth. The original Gyuma is defeated by Jiraiya in Episode 13, but his identity is later assumed by a successor. In Episode 42, Gyuma's successor (祭忍 ギュウマ 二代目, Sainin Gyūma Nidaime) sends a female ninja named Akiko Masumoto (松本 秋子, Masumoto Akiko), a dead-ringer of Tetsuzan's late wife, to spy on the Yamaji Family. However, Akiko betrays the second Gyuma after befriending the Yamaji Family, particularly Manabu.
- Devil King (魔王, Maō): A cursed armor said to turn its wearer into an Asura. It is invulnerable to arrows and bullets, as it emits a powerful aura that can use its opponent's feelings against themselves. When Jiraiya approached the Devil King by lowering his fighting spirit, the Devil King's sword proved to be of no use at that moment. After Kurozaru is defeated, the Devil King is sealed away from the rest of the world once again.

=== Other Enemies ===
- Demonic Ninja Sylvia (魔忍 シルビア, Manin Shirubia): Appears in Episode 15. A sorceress who once terrorized Europe during the Middle Ages, she was magically sealed inside the Devil Sword (魔剣, Maken), but was released from her confinement after the sword is dug out by Haburamu from underneath a palace in Istanbul. She has the power to hypnotize people she comes in contact with and bring them under her control, as the ability to shoot lightning bolts from her Devil Sword. She is shown to be powerful enough to take on the entire Sorcerers Clan by herself.
- Akunobo Sugitani (杉谷 悪之坊, Sugitani Akunobō): Appears in Episode 28. A master of the Wicked Ninja Arts (邪悪忍法, Jaaku Ninpō) and skilled Kamayari wielder, he was the man responsible for the deaths of Hanzo and Chiyo, Toha's birth parents. He kept himself hidden for 17 years in a hideout within the Togakure mountain range alongside his army of minions. When Sugitani decides to come out of hiding to attack the Togakure village, he is challenged by Jiraiya, who sought to avenge his parents. His name comes from Sugitani Zenjūbō
- Darkness Ninja Devil Cats (闇忍 デビルキャッツ, Yaminin Debiru Kyattsu): An international jewel thief who lives a civilian life as the fortune teller Kuroneko (黒猫). He is very proud of his work and hates being called a petty thief. He wields a variety of weapons and has a ninja art which allows him to produce tarot cards. In Episode 36, he is arrested after being defeated and unmasked by Jiraiya and Reiha. He escapes from jail and in Episode 48, he fights Jiraiya again alongside Parchis and Silva Shark.
- Metallic Ninja Gamesh (鉄忍 ガメッシュ, Tetsunin Gamesshu): The boss of the Metallic Ninja Clan, a gang which plots to rule the world by using science for crime. His weapons includes two swords, a kusarigama that channels electricity, and a boomerang knife which he stores inside his right eyepatch. His Magnetic Storm Metallic Ninja Art (鉄忍法磁気嵐, Tetsuninpō Jikiarashi) causes him to shoot a red laser from his armor and cause a magnetic storm, while his Dark Hiding Metallic Ninja Art (鉄忍法闇隠れ, Tetsuninpō Yamikakure) allows him to hide in the shadow of his opponent. In Episode 23, he kidnaps three scientists (Dr. Smith, Dr. Brown, and Dr. Schmidt) with the help of the Sorcerers Clan, but his plot is foiled as a result of a quarrel with the Sorcerers Clan and he is ultimately defeated by Jiraiya. In Episode 40, he is rebuilt as "Gamesh 002" and cooperates with Demost to hunt down Jiraiya, but ends up being defeated by Mafuuba.

== Items ==
=== Equipment ===
- Jiraiya Suit (ジライヤスーツ, Jiraiya Sūtsu): A suit of armor passed throughout the Togakure school, it is the suit worn by Toha when he becomes Jiraiya. When not in use, it is usually kept hidden inside the ceiling of the Bujinkan school. It was originally the suit worn by the alien that brought the Pako to Earth.
- Optical-magnetized Light Vacuum Sword (磁光真空剣, Jikō Shinkū Ken): A sword passed throughout the Togakure school, it is Jiraiya's primary weapon. When Jiraiya yells the name of the sword, it becomes a shining laser blade. Any enemy defeated by a special technique performed with the blade will be wrapped in seven differently colored lights before vanishing. Only Toha, who is descended from the space alien that brought the sword, can use it to its full powers. Like the Jiraiya Suit, it was created from a meteorite that arrived from 300 light years away from Earth and fell into a glacier at the North Pole. When not in use, it is usually kept hidden inside a mirror within the Bujinkan school. It has its own fill as well. With this sword, Jiraiya can perform the following special techniques:
  - Front Bisection (真っ向両断, Makkō Ryōdan): A technique which cuts the enemy in half vertically, which is followed by a horizontal slice. It is Jiraiya's most commonly used finishing move.
  - Horizontal Flash (横一閃, Yoko Issen): A finishing move in which the enemy is cut in half horizontally. A variation of the technique is also used which can take down up to three adversaries at the same time, which is used in Episodes 14 and 48.
  - Lightning Flash Drop (稲妻落とし, Inazuma Otoshi): A technique in which the sword gathers lightning and when it radiates, it can attack numerous enemies at the same time. It is used in Episode 8 to break through Abdad's sorcery and again in Episode 18 to destroy the Devil King armor.
  - Diagonal Bisection (斜め両断, Naname Ryōzan): Technique used during Jiraiya's second transformation. The technique slices enemies diagonally and then horizontally. It is first used during Episode 12 at the middle of a border several times.
  - Soaring Slice (飛翔斬り, Hishō Kiri): Technique used during Jiraiya's second transformation. While curving, Jiraiya slices the enemy in an x-like pattern. It is the technique he uses in Episode 20 to destroy the Sorcerers Clan's "Buffalo" tank.
  - Ginkgo Slice (銀杏斬り, Ichō Kiri): Technique used during Jiraiya's second transformation. It is performed while Jiraiya is somersaulting in the air. Jiraiya uses it in Episode 29 to destroy the Sorcerers Clan's "Giant Cannon" weapon.
  - Crossed Slice (十文字斬り, Jūmonji Kiri): An enhanced version of the Front Bisection used during Jiraiya's second transformation, which finishes the enemy off faster than the regular version. Jiraiya uses it in Episode 29 against Dokusai, wounding his left arm, as well as in Episode 45 to finish off the Paper Ninja Clan Leader.
  - Wheelbarrow Cut (一輪車断, Ichirinsha Dan): Technique used during Jiraiya's second transformation. The enemy is cut after Jiraiya rotates his sword. Used in Episode 44.
  - Optical-magnetized True Eye Slash (磁光真眼斬り, Jikō Shingan Kiri): The most essential technique of the Togakure school, which Jiraiya learns from Tetsuzan in Episode 49. Jiraiya turns his mind blank and transforms his body into an antenna with the Art of Mind Guessing (察気術, Satsuki Jutsu) to predict his enemy's movements and then slices as he turns around. The technique is capable of cutting the user itself when applied to a mirror. The technique managed to wound Demost, as well as destroy Dokusai's mask during the final episode.
- Jiraiya Power Protector (ジライヤパワープロテクター, Jiraiya Pawā Purotekutā): A set of upgrade parts created by Dr. Smith that can be added to the Jiraiya Suit, they are introduced in Episode 11. It consists of a pair of shoulder pads and knee pads, a collar, and a special visor called the Jiraisearcher (ジライサーチャー, Jiraisāchā) that allows the wearer to analyze and see-through surroundings. They are equipped over the Jiraiya Suit during battle as part of a secondary transformation.
- Jiraibuster (ジライバスター, Jiraibasutā): Jiraiya's raygun introduced in Episode 13, it appears to be a weapon handed down to the Yamaji Family. It uses three different types of ammunition: a medical cartridge that shoots anesthetic rounds, a signal cartridge that shoots signal rounds, and a material destroying cartridge that can destroy rocks. The Jiraibuster is mainly used as a defensive weapon, since it is not capable of firing lethal shots.

=== Vehicles ===
- Black Saber (ブラックセイバー, Burakku Seibā): Full length: 4405mm / Full width: 1725mm / Height: 1295mm / Total weight: 1470 kg. A modified sports car driven by Jiraiya. It is originally an ordinary black Nissan Fairlady Z that belonged to Toha until Dr. Smith decides to modify it, inspired by Tetsuzan's idea of combining science with ninjutsu. While it still resembles an ordinary car on the outside, it is equipped with numerous special devices such as a state-of-the-art radar, pop-up-style machine guns inside the retractable light units, a missile and anchor launchers inside the hood, and makibishis behind the rear wheels. Its body has also been reinforced to make it durable enough to withstand any explosion. Its top speed is 310 km (approximately 190 mph).
- Ninja Car (忍者カー, Ninja Kā): Toha's car prior to being modified into the Black Saber. In episode 2, it can be seen that its license plate is 品川33 や・27-12. Three episodes later, it had Jiraiya Suit's helmet's forehead design incorporated into the bonnet.
- Jiraishin (磁雷神): The giant statue of a war god that was kept within the depths of Mount Kongō. Stands approximately 20 meters (or 66 feet) tall, it serves as the guardian deity of the Pako against the greatest evils. Jiraiya can fuse with Jiraishin and control its movement by transporting himself into its chest. Jiraishin's weapons consists of the Indestructible Magnetic Bolt Sword (金剛磁雷剣, Kongō Jirai Ken) and the Windmill Lance (風車槍, Fūsha Yari). It is said to have been built by Prince Shōtoku with the purpose of protecting Pako. While Jiraishin appears in a total of six episodes following its first appearance in Episode 34, the only times that it fights a giant enemy are in Episode 35 against the Sorcerer Behemoth Gohma and in the final episode against a giant Dokusai. When not in use, Jiraishin is kept underground inside a giant rock seal with Jiraishin's name inscribed that covers it from up to its neck, with its blow-back helmet part usually closed.
- Shadow Mach (シャドーマッハ, Shadō Mahha): Wind Ninja Mafuba's superbike. It is equipped with a laser beam gun in the right side of the headlight. In Episode 49, a shotgun was used as fake exhaust.

=== Pako ===
- The Treasured Pako (秘宝パコ, Hihō Pako): Voiced by Jun Yoshida. An alien time capsule that fell from space during the 4th century B.C. It holds a mysterious super energy equivalent to the Sun itself, causing the Sorcerers Clan and most of the World Ninjas to fight fiercely to obtain it. Its location is inscribed on a clay board (粘土板, nendo ita), which was split into two by Dokusai when he betrayed the Togakure school and took one of the halves, with the other half being kept by Tetsuzan. Its true form is that of an energy being from the Dark Planet that originally intended to invade the Earth, but was reformed when it experienced the kindness of earthlings. It can only communicate telepathically via Reiha, who is descended from one of the aliens that brought Pako to Earth.

== Episodes ==
Episode 49 ended up airing on January 15, 1989, because Emperor Shōwa died on January 7, 1989.

1. Jiraiya VS The Sorcerers Clan (磁雷矢VS妖魔一族, Jiraiya VS Yōma Ichizoku): written by Akira Nakahara, directed by Makoto Tsuji
2. Castle Ninja Baron Owl (城忍フクロウ男爵, Jōnin Fukurō Danshaku): written by Susumu Takaku, directed by Makoto Tsuji
3. Jail Ninja Haburamu's Treasure!! (牢忍ハブラムの秘宝!!, Rōnin Haburamu no Hihō!!): written by Susumu Takaku, directed by Kaneharu Mitsumura
4. Break! The Magic of Fire Ninja Chang Kung Fu (破れ!!火忍チャンカンフーの幻術, Yabure!! Kanin Chan Kan Fū no Genjutsu): written by Kunio Fujii, directed by Kaneharu Mitsumura
5. Stolen Optical-magnetized Light Vacuum Sword!! (奪われた磁光真空剣!!, Ubawareta Jikkō Shinkū Ken!!): written by Susumu Takaku, directed by Makoto Tsuji
6. Mystery of Mystery is a Riddle?! (謎の謎は謎謎?!, Nazo no Nazo wa Nazonazo?!): written by Kunio Fujii, directed by Makoto Tsuji
7. Jungle Hunter Beast Ninja Macumba (ジャングルのハンター獣忍マクンバ, Janguru no Hantā Jūnin Makunba): written by Susumu Takaku, directed by Kaneharu Mitsumura
8. Murder After the Date (暗殺はデートの後で, Ansatsu wa Deeto no Ato de): written by Kunio Fujii, directed by Kaneharu Mitsumura
9. Trembling Trap Pako Strategy (ワナワナ罠のパコ作戦, Wana Wana Wana no Pako Sakusen): written by Susumu Takaku, directed by Akihisa Okamoto
10. Life? Death? Spiritual Ninja Arts' Panic (生か死か!霊幻忍法の恐怖, Sei ka Shi ka! Reigen Ninpō no Kyōfu): written by Susumu Takaku, directed by Akihisa Okamoto
11. Angered Touha: Double Front Slash!! (怒りの闘破・真っ向両断!!, Ikari no Tōha: Makkō Ryō Dan!!): written by Susumu Takaku, directed by Kaneharu Mitsumura
12. The Folded Paper Pendant is the Pledge of Love (折鶴のペンダントは愛の誓い, Orizuru no Pendanto wa Ai no Chikai): written by Kunio Fujii, directed by Kaneharu Mitsumura
13. Feast Ninja vs. Seven Ninjas (祭忍VS七人の忍者たち, Sainin VS Shichinin no Ninja-tachi): written by Susumu Takaku, directed by Itaru Orita
14. Little Life's Burning Explosive Ninja Rocket Man (小さな命に燃えた爆忍ロケットマン, Chiisa na Inochi ni Moeta Bakunin Roketto Man): written by Kenji Terada, directed by Itaru Orita
15. The Legend of the Cursed Witch (呪いの魔女伝説, Noroi no Majo Densetsu): written by Susumu Takaku, directed by Kaneharu Mitsumura
16. A Ninja Cyborg Cries in the Wind! Wind Ninja Mafuuba (風に泣くサイボーグ忍者!風忍馬風破, Kaze ni Naku Saibōgu Ninja! Kazenin Mafūba): written by Kenji Terada, directed by Kaneharu Mitsumura
17. Yumeha I: Demon Hidden in Lake Hamana! (夢破I浜名湖に潜む魔王!, Yumeha I Hamanako ni Hisomu Maō!): written by Kunio Fujii, directed by Makoto Tsuji
18. Yumeha II: An Aura Burning in the Great Sand Hill (夢破II霊気が燃える大砂丘!, Yumeha II Reiki ga Moeru Dai Sakyū!): written by Kunio Fujii, directed by Makoto Tsuji
19. Invade the House of the Military God! (武神館を占領せよ!, Bushinkan o Senriyō seyo!): written by Susumu Takaku, directed by Itaru Orita
20. Hello! Lightning Ninja Wild is the Cheerful Gunman (ハロー!雷忍ワイルドは陽気なガンマン, Harō! Rainin Wairudo wa Yōki na Ganman): written by Akira Nakahara, directed by Itaru Orita
21. Holy Ninja Alamsa: Throw the Shuriken of Hatred! (聖忍アラムーサ・怒りの手裏剣を放て!, Seinin Aramūsa: Ikari no Shuriken o Hanate!): written by Kenji Terada, directed by Kaneharu Mitsumura
22. Bloom! The Splendor of One Ninja Art (花咲け!美しきくの一忍法, Hanasake! Utsukushikiku no Ichininpō): written by Takashi Kuki, directed by Kaneharu Mitsumura
23. Dokusai Fears?! Metallic Ninja Gamessh (毒斎より怖い?!鉄忍ガメッシュ, Dokusai yori Kowai?! Tetsunin Gamesshu): written by Kenji Terada, directed by Makoto Tsuji
24. The Captain Pirate's Golden Coin (海賊キャプテンクックの金貨, Kaizoku Kyaputenkukku no Kinka): written by Susumu Takaku, directed by Makoto Tsuji
25. There is no Pets! The Ramen Lady Great Hard Battle (ペットがいない!ラーメン小母さん大奮戦, Petto ga Inai! Rāmen Obasan Daifunsen): written by Susumu Takaku, directed by Akihisa Okamoto
26. A Crisis! Kei and Emiha (おしゃれと危険!ケイと恵美破, Oshareto Kiken! Kei to Emiha): written by Kunio Fujii, directed by Akihisa Okamoto
27. Touha's Enemy is Jiraiya (闘破の敵は磁雷矢, Tōha no Teki wa Jiraiya): written by Takashi Kuki and Tsuyoshi Koike, directed by Kaneharu Mitsumura
28. Look Out, Togakure-ryu: Touha is Whose Son? (あぶない戸隠流・闘破は誰の子?, Abunai Togakure-ryū: Tōha wa Dare no Ko?): written by Susumu Takaku, directed by Kaneharu Mitsumura
29. Olympic Zero-Grade Young Ninja (0点小僧の忍者オリンピック, Reitenkozō no Ninja Orinpikku): written by Tsuyoshi Koike, directed by Makoto Tsuji
30. Ninja Art: Flower Lanttern! (忍法・ハナちょうちん!, Ninpō: Hana Chōchin!): written by Nobuo Ogizawa, directed by Makoto Tsuji
31. Takeda Shingen's Love Katana is Found in Paris (パリで見つかった武田信玄の愛刀, Pari de Mitsukatta Takeda Shingen no Aitō): written by Susumu Takaku, directed by Akihisa Okamoto
32. The Beach Kunoichi's Ninja Art Notebook (渚のくの一忍法帖, Nagisa no Kunoichi Ninpōjō): written by Kunio Fujii, directed by Akihisa Okamoto
33. The Guitar-Desiring Bird:Lightning Ninja Wild (ギターかかえた渡り鳥・雷忍ワイルド, Gitā Kakaeta Watari Tori: Rainin Wairudo): written by Nobuo Ogizawa, directed by Kaneharu Mitsumura
34. Gotten Out!! Sorcerers' Giant Beast Greatest Crisis (出た!!妖魔巨獣史上最大の危機, Deta!! Yōma Kyojū Shijō Saidai no Kiki): written by Susumu Takaku, directed by Kaneharu Mitsumura
35. Raised in the Sky Jiraishin!! (天空に立つ磁雷神!!, Tenkū ni Tatsu Jiraishin!!): written by Susumu Takaku, directed by Kaneharu Mitsumura
36. Black Cat's Eye Shines in the Dark! Phantom Thief Devil Cats (闇に光る黒猫の目!怪盗デビルキャッツ, Yami ni Hikaru Kuroneko no Me! Kaitō Debiru Kyattsu): written by Nobuo Ogizawa, directed by Akihisa Okamoto
37. 2300-Year Old Man Space Ninja Demost (2300年生きた男宇宙忍デモスト, 2300 Nensei Kita Otoko Uchūnin Demosuto): written by Susumu Takaku, directed by Akihisa Okamoto
38. Outrageous!! Hundred-Faced Sorcerers Clan (奇っ怪!!百の顔の妖魔一族, Kikkai!! Hyaku no Kao no Yōma Ichizoku): written by Susumu Takaku, directed by Kiyoshi Arai
39. Poisonous Spider Explosion!! Good Luck? Bad Luck? (毒グモ爆弾!!吉か・凶か?, Dokugumo Bakudan!! Kichi ka・Kyō ka?): written by Susumu Takaku, directed by Kiyoshi Arai
40. Sadness' Jeanne (哀しみのジャンヌ, Kanashimi no Jannu): written by Noboru Sugimura, directed by Kaneharu Mitsumura
41. Optical-Magnetized Light Vacuum Sword VS Dark Sword (磁光真空剣VS暗黒剣, Jikkō Shinkū Ken VS Ankoku Ken): written by Susumu Takaku, directed by Kaneharu Mitsumura
42. Goodbye! Illusion Mother-sama (さよなら!幻の母上様, Sayonara! Maboroshi no Hahaue-sama): written by Nobuo Ogizawa, directed by Kaneharu Mitsumura
43. The Girl's Pray! Miraculous Ninja Strowver's 100,000 Volt Panic (少女の祈り!灼忍ストローボ百万ボルトの恐怖, Shōjo no Inori! Shakunin Sutorōbo Hyakuman Boruto no Kyōfu): written by Noboru Sugimura, directed by Akihisa Okamoto
44. Jiraishin's Great Explosion!! Father and Daughter's Battlefield (磁雷神大爆破!!戦場の父と娘, Jiraishin Dai Bakuha!! Senjō no Chichi to Musume): written by Tsuyoshi Koike, directed by Akihisa Okamoto
45. Jiraishin's Power! A Bridge of Love and Hope (磁雷神の力!愛と希望のかけ橋, Jiraishin no Chikara! Ai to Kibō no Kake Hashi): written by Kunio Fujii, directed by Kiyohiko Miyasaka
46. Black Rumor: Ninjas Running Towards Justice (黒い噂・駆けつけろ正義の忍者たち!, Kuroi Uwasa: Kaketsukeru Seigi no Ninja-tachi): written by Nobuo Ogizawa, directed by Kiyohiko Miyasaka
47. Manabu's First Love: Danger in Mount Kongo (学の初恋・あまりにあぶない金剛山, Manabu no Hatsukoi: Amari ni Abunai Kongō-san): written by Kunio Fujii and Yasuhiro Fujii, directed by Kiyoshi Arai
48. Finally Came Out!! Treasure of the Century Pako!! (遂に出た!!世紀の秘宝パコ!!, Tsui ni Deta!! Seiki no Hihō Pako!!): written by Susumu Takaku, directed by Kaneharu Mitsumura
49. World Ninja! Great Assemble in Mount Kongo (世界忍者!金剛山に大集結!!, Sekai Ninja! Kongō-san ni Daishūketsu): written by Susumu Takaku, directed by Kaneharu Mitsumura
50. The End of the Sorcerers Clan! Farewell, Pako and Jiraishin!! (妖魔一族の最後!さらばパコ＝磁雷神!!, Yōma Ichizoku no Saigo! Saraba Pako＝Jiraishin!!): written by Susumu Takaku, directed by Kaneharu Mitsumura

== Cast ==
- Tōha Yamaji (山地 闘破, Yamaji Tōha): Takumi Tsutsui (筒井 巧, Tsutsui Takumi)
- Kei Yamaji (山地 ケイ, Yamaji Kei): Megumi Sekiguchi (関口 めぐみ, Sekiguchi Megumi)
- Manabu Yamaji (山地 学, Yamaji Manabu): Takumi Hashimoto (橋本 巧, Hashimoto Takumi)
- Tetsuzan Yamaji (山地 哲山, Yamaji Tetsuzan): Masaaki Hatsumi (初見 良昭, Hatsumi Masaaki)
- Ryō Asuka (飛鳥 竜, Asuka Ryō): Issei Hirota
- Rei Yagyū (柳生 レイ, Yagyū Rei): Tomoko Taya (田谷 知子, Taya Tomoko)
- Benikiba: Hiromi Nohara (野原 ひろみ, Nohara Hiromi)
- Kumo-Gozen's "front" form: Machiko Soga
- Kumo-Gozen's "rear" form: Hizuru Uratani

=== Voice cast ===
- Tetsuzan Yamaji: Dai Nagasawa
- Dokusai: Shozo Izuka
- Retsukiba: Shingo Hiromori
- Karasutengu #1: Ittoku Yamanaka
- Karasutengu #2: Moichi Saitō
- Karasutengu #3, Gyuma, Gamesh: Toku Nishio
- Mafūba (49-50), Baron Owl, Alamsa, Uha, Strowver, Rocketman (14): Atsuo Mori
- Rocketman: Seiichi Hirai
- Beni Tokage: Takeshi Kuwabara (5), Teiji Oomiya (31)
- Beni Tokage (41), Chang Kung Fu, Macumba: Eiji Maruyama
- Chang Kung Fu's son: Michirō Iida
- Lulong, Parchis, Silva Shark, Demost: Eisuke Yoda
- Sylvia: Naoko Matsui
- Akunobo Sugitani: Takeshi Watabe
- Pako: Jun Yoshida
- Narrator: Toru Ohira

=== Guest cast ===
- Henry Rakuchin: Masayuki Suzuki (1, 3-4, 6, 25, 36, 46)
- Haburamu: Kin Oomae (3, 15)
- Abdad: Ulf Otsuki (8)
- Maira: Emi Sato (8)
- Dr. Smith: Chris "Akshara" Reynolds (11, 16, 23)
- Oruha: Shohei Kusaka (12, 26, 45)
- Kasumi Mimura: Megumi Ueno (12, 26, 45)
- Kensuke Mimura: Hiroshi Seigo (12)
- Tao (child): Yuki Shibuya (14, 44)
- Kaze: Jyunichi Haruta (16)
- Yumeha: Tamao Matsugi (17-18, 32)
- Kurozaru: Bun Nakamura (17-18)
- Genichiro Murakami (Flower Ninja's Leader): Koji Kawai (17)
- Satsuki: Ayako Kanda (22)
- Satsuki's father: Daisuke Fujimori (22)
- Satsuki's mother: Yasuko Kato (22)
- Dr. Brown: Ronnie Santana (23)
- Dr. Schmidt: Malcom McLeod (23)
- Kaiyo Tsumoto: Botan Senba (25)
- Kaiyo's Husband: Ippei Kawashima (25)
- Shintaro "Shin" Yazaka: Kaname Kawai (26)
- Development Company's President: Eiichi Kikuchi (26)
- Yajirō Iyo: Kenji Ohba (27)
- Chiyo: Miho Tojo (28, 42, 50)
- Hanzo: Koji Matoba (28, 42)
- Shogo: Eisuke Yoda (28)
- Doctor: Atsuo Mori (28)
- Katherine: Dorothée (29, 31)
- Kuroi Ibara: Kazuoki Takahashi (30)
- Genchi Koshimura: Jun Tatara (30)
- Devil Cats: Mickey Curtis (36)
- Jeanne: Sumiko Kakizaki (40)
- Sanae Yamaji/Akiko Matsumoto: Yukiko Yoshino (42)
- Tao (adult): Aya Shindo (44)
- Paper Ninja Clan Leader: Katsuhiko Kobayashi (45)

=== Stunt cast ===
- Jiraiya (Power Protect Suit): Koji Matoba (11-26, 29-40, 42-47), Takumi Tsutsui (28, 48-50)
- Org Ninja Dokusai/Ninja (13)/Kaze (16)/Akunobo Sugitani (28): Noriaki Kaneda
- Star Ninja Retsukiba: Ryo Nagamine
- Demonic Ninja Sylvia: Miyuki Nagato
- Wind Ninja Mafuuba: Jyunichi Haruta (16, 29, 40, 46), Shunya Shinoda (49-50)
- Anthropomorphic Ninja Vermillion Tokage: Toshiyuki Kikuchi, Hiroshi Seki
- Lightning Ninja Wild: Michael Callman, Jiro Ishii
- Holy Ninja Alamsa: Yasuhiro Takeuchi, Tetsuya Aoki
- Castle Ninja Baron Fukorou: Masahiro Sudo. Toshiyuki Kikuchi
- Explosive Ninja Rocketman: Hiroshi Seki, Yasuhiro Takeuchi
- Chinese Ninja Lulong: Tsutomu Kitagawa (2, 10-11), Satoru Katagiri (49)
- Fire Ninja Chang Kung-Fu (father and son): Hideo Ninomiya
- Feast Ninja Gyuma: Makoto Kenmochi (13), Haruyuki Higuchi (42), Hiroyuki Nonaka (49)
- Metallic Ninja Gamesh: Richii Seike, Shuji Sakamoto
- Space Ninja Demost: Richii Seike (37-39), Naoki Oofuji (40-41, 46, 48-49), Hirokazu Shoji (without head)
- Metallic Ninja Gamesh 002: Richii Seike
- Darkness Ninja Devil Cats: Naoki Oofuji (36, 48), Atsuya Nishimura (49)
- Changing Ninja Parchis: Toshiyuki Kikuchi (19, 22, 31, 40), Satoru Katagiri (48), Hiroki Nakayama (49)
- Fire: Hiroshi Seki
- Water: Shogo Shiotani
- Tree: Tetsuya Aoki
- Earth: Yukio Yada
- Beast Ninja Macumba/Miraculous Ninja Strowver: Hiroyuki Uchida
- Bird Ninja Karasutengus: Noriaki Kaneda, Hiroyuki Uchida, Takeshi Miyazaki, Shoji Hachisuka, Kazutoshi Yokoyama
- Jiraishin: Noboru Tsurumaki
- Beast Ninja Macumba's Brother: Hiroshi Seki

== Songs ==
Opening theme

- "Jiraiya" (ジライヤ)
  - Lyrics: Keisuke Yamakawa
  - Composition: Kisaburō Suzuki (鈴木 キサブロー, Suzuki Kisaburō)
  - Arrangement: Osamu Totsuka (戸塚 修, Totsuka Osamu)
  - Artist: Akira Kushida

Ending theme

- "SHI·NO·BI '88"
  - Lyrics: Keisuke Yamakawa
  - Composition: Kisaburō Suzuki
  - Arrangement: Osamu Totsuka
  - Artist: Akira Kushida

== International Broadcasts and Home Video ==
- In its home country of Japan, select episodes for the series was released on 2 VHS volumes as part of the Hero Club series by Toei Video for rental and sale. Then from November 21, 2008, to March 21, 2009, the series was released in full for the first time on DVD with a total of five volumes, with each volume containing 2 discs and 10 episodes.
- In France, the series was broadcast with a French dub and aired as Giraya Ninja on the Club Dorothée block on TF1 on May 24, 1989, with a French dub produced by AB Groupe with dubbing work by Studio SOFRECI. Just a bit over four months after the last episode aired in Japan. All 50 episodes were dubbed and aired on the block from start to finish in full. Dorothée herself made a guest appearance on Episodes 29 and 31, whereis she was dubbed over in the original Japanese broadcasting when she appeared. On June 1, 2023, the French dub of the series was made available on Amazon Prime Video.
- In Spain, the series did not air at all, but the toyline was released in Bandai, and given the same title as France, Giraya Ninja. Even the logo was the same.
- In Brazil, the series was broadcast with a Brazilian Portuguese dub on October 2, 1989, on Rede Manchete as Jiraiya: O Incrível Ninja and was proven very popular throughout the 1990s. It aired on the same channel again as late as 1998 and 1999. When it was changed to Rede TV! it still aired in late-1999 during the afternoons. Throughout the 2010s, the series aired on re-runs on many channels such as TV Diário, Rede Brasil de Televisão, Ulbra TV, Nova Geração de Televisão and TV Marajoara in Ananindeua.
- In Thailand, the series aired on Channel 7 with a Thai dub every Sundays mornings throughout 1990 as Ninja War Jiraiya's World (ศึกสงครามนินจาโลกจิไรยะ Ṣ̄ụks̄ngkhrāmnincā Lokcirịya).
- In the Philippines, the series aired on ABS-CBN from 1991 to 1992 with a Tagalog dub.
- In Indonesia, the series was achieved to be very popular with viewers. It first aired with an Indonesian dub on Indosiar from January 6, 1995, to August 23, 1998, with all episodes shown as well as re-runs.

== Adaptations ==
The suit for Jiraiya was used in Power Rangers Super Ninja Steel in the episode "Sheriff Skyfire" (which uses footage from episode 34 of Ninninger) for the titular character (voiced by Mark Mitchinson) who works as an intergalactic police officer. He crashed the latest episode of "Galaxy Warriors" to arrest Blammo for his illegal demolition activity. Madame Odius appeared where she tricks Sheriff Skyfire into going after the Rangers. Both sides duel until they rescue an elderly woman that nearly got caught in the crossfire. Realizing that he was lied to, Sheriff Skyfire agrees to help the Rangers while being informed of every monster that attacked Earth on Madame Odius' behalf. In addition, he gives a morality lesson to the Rangers on respecting law enforcement like when Hayley Foster got ticketed by Summer Cove High School's security guard Clint. When the bomb that Blammo planted was destroyed, Sheriff Skyfire assisted in fighting Blammo and lent his sword to Brody Romero to defeat Blammo. After Blammo was hit by the Gigantify Ray, Sheriff Skyfire watched the fight. Following Blammo's destruction, Sheriff Skyfire thanked the Rangers and teleported away to receive his next assignment from his superiors.
