= Toda Shinryuken Masamitsu =

Toda Shinryuken Masamitsu (戸田真竜軒正光) (1824–1909) is mentioned in the Bugei Ryuha Daijiten as being the head master of several styles of Japanese martial arts, including:

- Gyokko-ryū Kosshijutsu (玉虎流骨指術)
- Kotō-ryū Koppōjutsu (虎倒流骨法術)
- Shinden Fudō-ryū Dakentaijutsu (神伝不動流打拳体術)

During the later part of the Tokugawa period, the government ordered the building of a national military academy (kobusho). According to Bujinkan sources, in 1855 Toda was appointed as chief budo instructor by Matsudaira Noriyasu. The Bujinkan founder, Masaaki Hatsumi, indicates that Toda Shinryuken Masamitsu taught his skills to Toshitsugu Takamatsu, who later passed them on to him.

Masaaki Hatsumi have noted that the true names in the lineage have been obfuscated by Toshitsugu Takamatsu. The real historical figure has been skeptically identified as Toda Hisajiro, although to this date no accurate proof identifying his actual existence has been found (戸田久次郎).

Bujinkan sources indicate that Toda taught the following "five precepts for ninpo":

1. To know that patience comes first.
2. To know that the path of mankind comes from justice.
3. To renounce greed, laziness, and obstinacy.
4. To recognize sadness, worry, and resentment as natural and to seek the immovable heart (fudoshin).
5. To not stray from the path of loyalty and brotherly love and to delve always deeper into the heart of budo pursuing the ways of both the literary and martial arts with balanced determination.

He is also quoted by the Bujinkan as saying "Even when you are faced with certain death, die laughing."
