= Ninjatō =

Alleged ninja sword

Ninjatō (忍者刀)
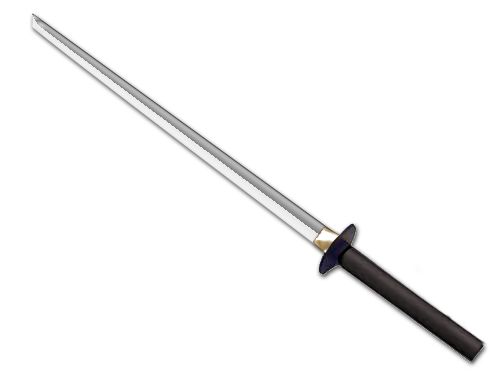
- A computer image sample depiction of the ninjatō
- Type: Short sword (single-edge)
- Place of origin: Japan

Service history
- Used by: Ninjutsu practitioners (allegedly)

Specifications
- Mass: ~0.42 kilograms (0.93 lb)
- Length: ~48 centimetres (19 in)
- Blade length: Blade length 46 centimetres (18 in) 46 cm 61 centimetres (24 in)

The ninjatō (忍者刀), ninjaken (忍者剣), or shinobigatana (忍刀) is alleged to be the preferred weapon of the shinobi of feudal Japan. It is portrayed by modern ninjutsu practitioners (including Masaaki Hatsumi and Stephen K. Hayes) as the weapon of the ninja and features prominently in popular culture. 20th-century examples of this sword are displayed at the Koka Ninja Village Museum in Kōka, Shiga, at the Gifu Castle Archives Museum in Gifu, Gifu Prefecture, Japan and at the Ninja Museum of Igaryu, established in the mid-1960s.

Historically, there is no evidence for the existence of this "katana-like short sword legendarily used by ninja" before the 20th century. Instead, the designs demonstrated by alleged replicas may be based on the design of wakizashi or chokutō swords or the swords associated with ashigaru—common infantrymen with no "ninja" aspects.

== History ==
Because of the lack of any physical evidence or antique swords from the Sengoku to the 20th century matching the description of the ninjatō, the history of the weapon can only be chronicled reliably from the 20th century onwards.

- 1956: The first known photograph of a straight-blade "ninja" sword is featured in a 26-page Japanese booklet entitled Ninjutsu by Heishichirō Okuse.
- 1964: The sword appears in the Japanese jidaigeki movie series Shinobi no Mono—Shinobi no Mono Kirigakure Saizō (忍びの者 霧隠才蔵) and Shinobi no Mono Zoku Kirigakure Saizō (忍びの者 続・霧隠才蔵), the 4th and 5th entries in the series—released in theaters in Japan. That same year, the Ninja Museum of Igaryu in Japan, which houses 20th-century examples of the sword, is established.
- 1973: Ads selling newly manufactured and imported "ninja" swords appear in the American magazine Black Belt.
- 1981: Books containing references to the sword written by Masaaki Hatsumi, the founder of the Bujinkan, and Stephen K. Hayes, an American who studied under Hatsumi in 1975, are published.
- 1981: The first Hollywood film to feature the ninjatō, Enter the Ninja, was released in theaters.
- 1983: The next Hollywood film to feature the ninjatō, Revenge of the Ninja, was released in theaters in September 1983.
- 1984: The first American television production to feature these swords, The Master, was broadcast on NBC from January to August 1984.

== Appearance ==
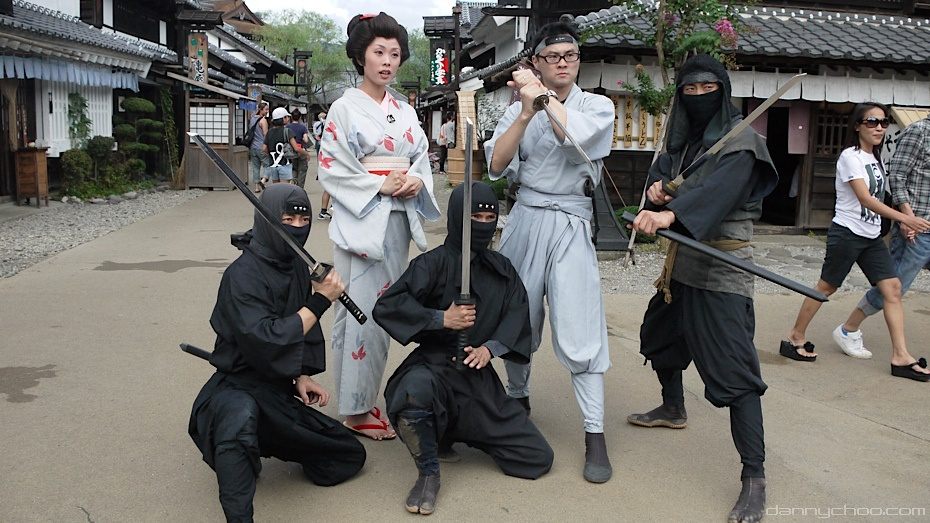
Ninjatō-wielding Edo Wonderland Nikko Edomura entertainers, October 2010

The ninjatō is typically depicted as being a short sword, often portrayed as having a straight blade (similar to that of a shikomizue) with a square guard. Usually of a length "less than 60 cm", the rest of the sword is comparatively "thick, heavy and straight". Despite the disputed historical existence of the ninjato, Hayes claims to describe it in detail, and states that the typical description of the ninjatō could be due to ninja having to forge their own blades from slabs of steel or iron with the cutting edge being ground on a stone, with Hayes alleging that straight blades were easier to form than the much more refined curved traditional Japanese sword. His second offered reason for ninjatō being described as a straight-bladed, rather short sword is that the ninja were emulating one of the patron Buddhist deities of ninja families, Fudo Myo-oh, who, per Hayes, is depicted brandishing a straight-bladed short sword similar to a chokutō.

== Usage ==
Due to the lack of historical evidence regarding the existence of the ninjatō, techniques for usage in a martial context are largely speculative. When used in film and stage, ninjatō are depicted as being shorter than a katana with a straight blade but they are utilized in a "nearly identical" manner as the katana. Books and other written materials have described a number of possible ways to use the sword including "fast draw techniques centered around drawing the sword and cutting as a simultaneous defensive or attacking action", with "a thrust fencing technique", and with a "reverse grip".

Contemporary sources allege the scabbard was used for various purposes, such as a respiration pipe (snorkel) in underwater activities or for secretly overhearing conversations. The scabbard is also said to have been longer than the blade of the ninjatō in order to hide various objects such as chemicals used to blind pursuers. The tsuba (hand guard) of the ninjato is described in one contemporary source as being larger than average and square instead of the much more common round tsuba. One source's belief about the ninjatō tsuba size and shape is that the user would lean the sword against a wall and would use the tsuba as a step to extend his normal reach, and the sword would then be retrieved by pulling it up by the sageo (saya cord).

== "Ninja swords" ban in the United Kingdom ==
In 2025, the British government banned the possession, manufacture, import and selling of knives deemed "ninja swords", describing the "majority" of the banned weapons as having "a blade between 14 inches and 24 inches with one straight cutting edge with a tanto style point."

== Literature ==
- A Glossary of Arms and Armor, ed. George C. Stone, Southworth Press, 1961, p. 469
