= Kaiten (disambiguation) =

Kaiten were a Japanese World War II suicide torpedo.

Kaiten may also refer to:

- Kaiten, a rolling maneuver in the martial art of taijutsu
- Kaiten, a program for effecting Denial-of-service attacks
- Japanese warship Kaiten, flagship of the breakaway Japanese Republic of Ezo
- Kaiten-zushi, the Japanese term for sushi served from a conveyor belt
