= To-Shin Do =

Martial art founded by Stephen K. Hayes in 1997

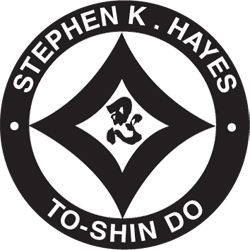
- Date founded: 1997
- Country of origin: (United States) USA
- Founder: Stephen K. Hayes
- Ancestor schools: Togakure-ryū
- Official website: https://toshindo.online/

To-Shin Do is a martial art founded by Black Belt Hall of Fame instructor Stephen K. Hayes in 1997. It is a modernized version of ninjutsu (ninpo taijutsu), and differs from the traditional form taught by Masaaki Hatsumi’s Bujinkan organization. Instruction focuses on threats found in contemporary western society. In addition to hand-to-hand combat skills, students are exposed to: methods for survival in hostile environments, security protection for dignitaries, how to instruct classes and run a school, classical Japanese weapons, meditation mind science, and health restoration yoga. The headquarters school (hombu) is located in the private residence of the founder near Dayton, Ohio, USA.

== History ==
In 1975, Hayes traveled to Japan to seek out authentic Ninja masters. He met Masaaki Hatsumi, the 34th grandmaster of the Togakure-ryū (戸隠流) ("School of the Hidden Door") lineage and became the first American to be accepted into the Ninja tradition.

Hayes returned to the U.S. in 1981, with a black belt in the Bujinkan organization under his teacher, Masaaki Hatsumi, who is the 34th Grandmaster of Togakure Ryu Ninpo Taijutsu. He founded the Shadows of Iga Society to serve as an organization for ninjutsu enthusiasts. During the 1980s Hayes gave seminars around the country, maintained a training group in Ohio, and often visited Japan for training with Hatsumi.

Retiring the Shadows of Iga Society, Hayes founded the Kasumi-An system of warrior training in 1989 on the first day of the Japanese Heisei (平成) Imperial era. Kasumi translates to English as "mist," which is supposed to evoke images of the misty Iga mountain home of the Ninja, as well as being a heterograph of the founder's name. An means hermitage or mountain retreat. The name reflects more permanency in Hayes' U.S. teachings, which were until this point limited to seminars and a small training group in the Dayton area.

In 1997, the first Quest Center was opened in Dayton, OH.

== Etymology ==
There is intended symbolism behind the To-Shin name. When written, To-Shin Do is formed of three kanji:

- 刀 – to – sword
- 心 – shin – heart
- 道 – dō – way, path

The literal Japanese to English translation of To-Shin Do is “Sword Spirit Path”. Practitioners of the art use a more developed translation where To = the skills and strategy, Shin = the intent and willpower, and Do = the path to mastery.

The kanji for to and the kanji for shin combine within the kanji symbol nin 忍, pronounced shinobi, which is the symbol for the ninja, although the top half of 忍 is actually ha/yaiba 刃 not tō 刀.

== Training ==
According to the To-Shin Do training workbook, Enlightened Self-Protection, color belts focus on the following five areas:

- grappling: throwing, choking, and joint-locking
- striking: kicking, and punching
- weapons: stick, blade, cord, and projectile
- application: handling multiple assailants and surprise attacks
- preservation: overcoming psychological intimidation or bullying

Students practice striking against pads, targets, and instructors clad in protective armor. However, there is no sparring as seen in many other combat systems. And, as in ninjutsu, To-Shin Do does not include tournament competition in its training curriculum.

Once a student attains the rank of black belt, the following optional advanced courses are offered:

- first-response emergency medical treatment
- methods for survival in hostile environments
- security protection for dignitaries
- law enforcement specialties
- intelligence gathering systems
- how to instruct classes and run a school
- classical Japanese weapons

== Relationship to Bujinkan ==
To-Shin Do is not a part of Hatsumi's Bujinkan organization. Consequently, speculation on various martial arts web discussion boards and blogs have theorized To-Shin Do represents a split between Hayes and Hatsumi. However published interviews do not support these rumors.

In interviews, Hatsumi explained that he did not feel it was appropriate to modify traditional techniques to apply to contemporary society or locales. Instead, he charged his trainees to make these adaptations. Black Belt magazine notes that as early as 1979, Hatsumi told his senior black belts that "it is the duty of every senior instructor to create a unique teaching vehicle from the historical material." Hatsumi reiterated when interviewed for Tales from a Grand Master, and that traditional weapons (e.g. tekagi, kusari gama, or toami) are still part of the core Bujinkan training.

Conversely, Hayes expressed a desire to apply ancient ninja tactics to modern Western society. In his 2008 book The Way of the Warrior: Martial Arts and Fighting Styles from Around the World author Chris Crudelli quotes Hayes as saying founding "To-Shin Do is the greatest tribute he can pay to Hatsumi." Clearly, it can be said that the two men disagreed on the topic of contemporary application of the art. But this disagreement did not sever the men's relationship. For Hayes' sixtieth birthday (in 2009), Hatsumi sent a rare hand-written card and painting to congratulate his American student.

== School locations ==
To-Shin Do has established presences on five continents. Because the style is licensed from SKH Incorporated, there are different levels of participation: Affiliate Instructors, Affiliate Schools, and Training Clubs.

Affiliate Instructors operate as independently owned businesses authorized to train the To-Shin Do martial arts curriculum under license agreement with Stephen K. Hayes.

Affiliate Schools are professionally run academies, with full-time facilities dedicated for To-Shin Do instruction, and are authorized to award To-Shin Do belt rank.

Training Clubs are groups of up to 35 members training together in the To-Shin Do martial arts curriculum under direction of either Hombu or a licensed Affiliate Instructor. Training Clubs are not professional schools, and often use shared facilities not exclusively dedicated for To-Shin Do instruction. Most clubs do not award belt ranks however, some have done so through their sponsoring teachers.

Long Distance Learning is available to students through the organization's official online dojo: To-Shin Do Online. The online dojo resembles a private social media site with student and instructor profiles and discussion groups for each rank where students can discuss and ask questions. To-Shin Do Online contains an extensive video training library including regular releases of new content and access to all materials previously published by Stephen K. Hayes for DVD and VHS. Remote students may test for color belts (kyu ranks) live on Zoom by appointment with an instructor. Black Belt testing must be conducted in person.

According to the Organization's web site, locations include:

- North America: US (16 schools), Canada
- Europe: United Kingdom
- Africa: South Africa
- Australia: Australia
- Asia: Iran

== Warrior scholar priests ==
Throughout To-Shin Do literature (in print, interview, or on the web) is an identification with ancient warrior-scholar-priests. Although other martial arts styles have ascribed to monastic or religious roots (e.g. Shaolin Kung Fu or Kalarippayattu), this concept manifests in senior To-Shin Do practitioners in two ways.

First, Black Belts promoted to 3rd Degree and higher become members of the Order of To-Shi (刀士), which means "sword" – "warrior, knight, gentleman" or succinctly, "Knight of the Sword." It is tradition that upon promotion, the candidate is given a 'warrior' name (Bugō), uniquely chosen by the Co-Founders.

Second, senior black belts have also taken the 'scholar' title literally, with several publishing books or articles in either martial arts or advanced psychological studies. Specific authors among the black belts include:

- Isler, Hakim. Modern Hand To Hand Combat: Ancient Samurai Techniques on the Battlefield and in the Street. Tuttle Press. 2010. ISBN 978-0-8048-4127-6.
- Sears, R. W. "Integrating Spirituality Into Clinical Practice." Innovations in Clinical Practice: A 21st Century Sourcebook, Vol. 2. E.M. Wolf, J.B. Allen, and L. Van de Creek, eds. Professional Resource Press. 2010. ISBN 978-1-56887-130-1.
- Denton, R.B., and R.W. Sears. "Use of Mindfulness in Clinical Practice." Innovations in Clinical Practice: A 21st Century Sourcebook, Vol 1. J.B. Allen and E.M. Wolf, eds. Professional Resource Press. 2008.
- Eldridge, Tori. Empowered Living. Publish America. 2005. ISBN 978-1-4137-8499-2.
- Russo, Mark. The Crap in my Cap. TQ Publishing. 2001. ISBN 1-59712-040-5.

== Sources ==
- Crudelli, Chris (2008). The Way of the Warrior: Martial Arts and Fighting Styles from Around the World. DK ADULT. ISBN 978-0-7566-6862-4.
- Hayes, Stephen K. (1992). Enlightened Self-Protection. SKH Quest Center Publishing. ISBN 0963247395.
- Toller, Dennis (October 1998). "Once the West's Most Celebrated Ninja, Stephen K. Hayes Has Moved Beyond the Assassin Image". Black Belt. pp. 32–36, 183 – via Google Books.
