= Stephen K. Hayes =

American martial artist and writer (born 1949)

- Born: September 9, 1949 (age 77); Wilmington, Delaware, United States
- Education: Miami University
- Occupations: Ninja master; martial arts; instructor; author; Buddhist priest
- Spouse: Rumiko Urata Hayes
- Children: Daughters: Reina and Marissa
- Website: https://www.stephenkhayes.com

Stephen K. Hayes (born September 9, 1949) is an American martial artist and writer.

== Early life ==
Stephen K. Hayes was born in Wilmington, Delaware, and raised in Dayton, Ohio. He graduated from Fairmont West High School in Kettering, Ohio, in 1967.

Hayes attended Miami University in nearby Oxford, Ohio, because he "heard they had a judo club". It turned out to be a Korean Tang Soo Do school, not judo, but Hayes remained. In 1971, he graduated from Miami with a Bachelor of Arts degree, having majored in speech and theatre.

== Martial arts career ==
In the 1970s, Hayes traveled to Japan. In June 1975, he met and began training under Tsunehisa Tanemura. He later trained under Masaaki Hatsumi, who refers to himself as 34th Grandmaster of Togakure-ryū ninjutsu and is the founder of the Bujinkan (武神館) organization.

Hayes returned to the United States with his wife, Rumiko, in late 1980 when his Japan residency visa expired, and began teaching and authoring numerous books and magazine articles.

In 1985, he was entered into the Black Belt magazine's Hall of Fame as Instructor of the Year. He was again featured on the cover of Black Belt in the March 2007 issue. The magazine's opening editorial described him as "one of the 10 most influential living martial artists in the world".

In 1993, Hayes was awarded the judan (tenth-degree black belt) in Bujinkan from Hatsumi.

In 1997, he founded the martial art of To-Shin Do, an art based in his experience of budō taijutsu.

In 2006, Hayes's name was removed from the display of active Bujinkan teachers, ending his official role within that organization. That his name plank was removed from the Bujinkan Honbu wall has been documented by both parties. However, the specifics regarding the motivation for the removal are in dispute. Some suggest Hayes was expelled from the organization. Hayes explains that he simply no longer participates as an active Bujinkan instructor. To-Shin Do is taught through his SKH (Stephen K. Hayes) Quest locations. The SKH Quest network now spans 31 schools across North America, Europe, Australia and Africa.

Hayes acted in the 1980 television miniseries Shogun and in 2004 was featured in the Discovery Channel documentary Unsolved History regarding ninja and their practices.

== Buddhism ==
Hayes is an ordained practitioner of esoteric Tendai Mikkyō Buddhism. He apprenticed under Dr. Clark Jikai Choffy, an ordained Tendai priest and personal disciple of Jion Haba, the bishop of Tokyo's Reisho-in temple. He received empowerments and teachings from Choffy, received transmission in the Homan Ryu school of Tendai esoteric Buddhism, and in 1991 he received Tokudo priesthood ordination in Tendai Buddhism. Hayes has founded a Buddhist Order based on his teachings and experiences with Tibetan Buddhism and Tendai, called the Blue Lotus Assembly.

While traveling through Tibet, Hayes met the Dalai Lama in 1987. During a conference in the United States when the Dalai Lama learned that he had received the 1989 Nobel Peace Prize Hayes assisted with the unexpected security concerns as reporters arrived. For many years in the 1990s, Hayes served as the Dalai Lama's personal protection escort and security adviser, especially during visits to the United States.

== Personal life ==
Hayes resides and works in Dayton, Ohio. He and his wife, Rumiko Hayes, have two daughters, Reina and Marissa.

== Books ==
Non-fiction

- Ninja: Spirit of the Shadow Warrior (1980), Ohara Publications
- The Ninja and Their Secret Fighting Art (1981), Charles E. Tuttle Co.
- Ninja vol. 2: Warrior Ways of Enlightenment (1981), Ohara Publications
- Ninja vol. 3: Warrior Path of Togakure (1983), Ohara Publications
- Ninjutsu: The Art of the Invisible Warrior (1984) Contemporary Books
- Wisdom from the Ninja Village of the Cold Moon (1984) Contemporary Books
- Ninja vol. 4: Legacy of the Night Warrior (1985), Ohara Publications
- The Mystic Arts of the Ninja: Hypnotism, Invisibility, and Weaponry (1985), Contemporary Books
- Ninja Realms of Power: Spiritual Roots and Traditions of the Shadow Warrior (1986)
- The Ancient Art of Ninja Warfare: Combat, Espionage, and Traditions (1988), Contemporary Books
- Ninja vol. 5: Lore of the Shinobi Warrior (1989), Ohara Publications
- Enlightened Self-Protection: The Kasumi-An Ninja Art Tradition: An Original Workbook (1992), Nine Gates Press
- Action Meditation: The Japanese Diamond and Lotus Tradition (1993), Nine Gates Press
- The Ninja Defense: A Modern Master's Approach to Universal Dangers (2012), Tuttle Publishing
- The Complete Ninja Collection (2013), Black Belt Communications

Fiction

- Tulku, a Tale of Modern Ninja (1985) Contemporary Books

== Filmography ==
- Shogun (1980), Ninja and Stunt double
- Ninja Vengeance (1988), Himself (as Ninjutsu Instructor)
- Black Creek (2024), Jake
