= Hōjutsu =

Japanese martial art

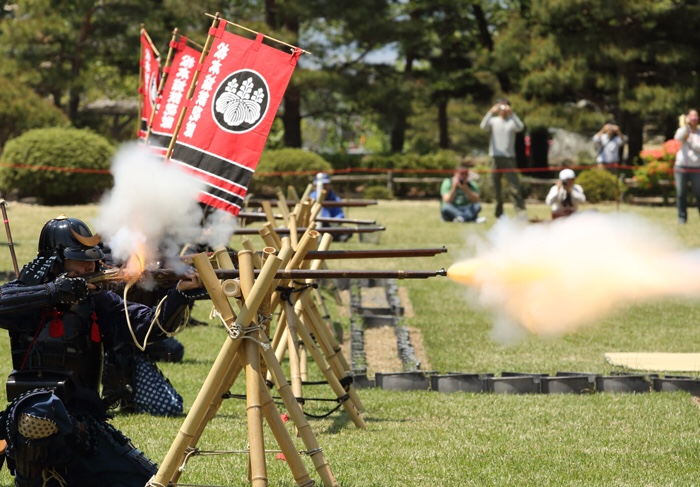
A samurai reenactor practicing hōjutsu at Matsumoto Castle. Japanese Gunnery is known as hōjutsu.

Hōjutsu (砲術) / Teppojutsu (鉄砲術), the art of gunnery, is the martial art of Japan dedicated to Japanese black powder firearm usage.

Hōjutsu is still practiced today, often with antique matchlock firearms such as the tanegashima. The martial art is most common in Japan where access to historical equipment is easier for practitioners. Groups such as the Matsumoto Castle Gun Corps maintain large collections of Edo era firearms.

== Schools ==
As with many Japanese martial arts, hōjutsu incorporates different styles of practice and traditional techniques. These styles (or schools) of shooting also have differing focuses as well as unique histories. Some of the most well known schools are:

- Buei-ryū (武衛流)

Founder: Unknown
Era: Early Edo, between 1638-1696
Place of Origin: Takeno, Tajima Province
Parent School: Tanegashima-ryu

- Fujioka-ryū (藤岡流)

Founder: Fujioka Rokuzaemon (藤岡六左衛門)
Era: Keicho (1596-1615)
Place of Origin: Okayama, Bizen (Founder was originally from Omi province)
Parent School: Inatomi-ryu

- Inatomi-ryū (稲富流)

Founder: Inatomi Sukenao (稲富 祐直)
Era: Keicho (1596-1615)
Place of Origin: Tanabe, Tanba Province
Parent School: Tanegashima-ryu

- Inoue-ryū/Geki-ryū (井上流)/(外記流)

Founder: Inoue Masatsugu (井上正継)
Era: Keicho (1596-1615)
Place of Origin: Harima Province
Parent School: Ise-no-Kami-ryu

- Ise-no-Kami-ryū (伊勢守流)

Founder: Mouri Takamasa (毛利高政)
Era: Eiroku Era 2nd year (1559) - Kan'ei 5th year (1628)
Place of Origin: Saiki, Bungo Province
Parent School: Tsuda-ryu

- Jiyusai-ryū (自由斎流)

Founder: Tsuda Shigetsugu (津田重次)
Era: Eiroku (Founded in 1568)
Place of Origin: Negoro-ji, Kii Province
Parent School: Tsuda-ryu

- Tabuse-ryū (田布施流)

Founder: Tabuse Gensuke Tadamune (田布施源助忠宗)
Era: Genki or Tensho Era (1570 - 1592)
Place of Origin: Kawachi Province (Modern Day Osaka Prefecture)
Parent School: Jiyusai Ryu [田布施一流炮術真業録秘書]

- Kasumi-ryū (霞流)

Founder: Maruta Kyuzaemon (?) (丸田九左衛門)
Era: Keicho (1596-1615)
Place of Origin: Yonezawa, Dewa
Parent School: Tanegashima-ryu

- Morishige-ryū (森重流)

Founder: Morishige Subeyoshi (森重都由)
Era: Kansei (1789-1801)
Place of Origin: Suetake Village, Suo Province
Parent School: Nakajima-ryu and Yasumori-ryu (Multiple non-shooting schools as well)

- Nakajima-ryū (中島流)

Founder: Nakajima Nagamori (中島長守)
Era: Early 18th Century (Earliest book is 1725)
Place of Origin: Unknown
Parent School: Buei-ryu, Jitoku-ryu and Sasaki-ryu

- Ogino-ryū (荻野流)

Founder: Ogino Rokubei Yasushige (荻野六兵衛安重)
Era: Mid-17th Century
Place of Origin: Unknown
Parent School: Tanegashima-ryu, plus 12 other schools including Masaki-ryu

- Takashima-ryū (高島流)

Founder: Akiho Takashima (高島 秋帆)
Era: Jōō Era (1834)
Place of Origin: Nagasaki, Hizen Province
Parent School: Dutch/European derived gunnery.

- Tsuda-ryu (津田流)

Founder: Tsuda Kenmotsu (津田監物)
Era: 1544 (First book produced in Eiroku era)
Place of Origin: Negoro-ji, Kii Province
Parent School: Tanegashima-ryu

Additional schools, or styles of shooting include:

- Namban-ryū (南蛮流)
- Seki-ryū (関流)
- Tanegashima-ryū (種子島流)
- Tazuke-ryū (田付流)
- Yō-ryū (陽流砲術)

== Gun groups ==
Gun groups were known as teppo tai (鉄砲隊). Teppo meaning "gun" and tai meaning "group", or "unit".

Recently the general media has come to view the samurai as warriors who were armed only with close combat weapons such as the katana. However, the Japanese were arguably relying more on firearms by the 17th Century than any other weapon. The Battle of Nagashino, where guns were deployed against samurai cavalry, is one of the most famous and influential battles in the history of the samurai.

== Ashigaru ==
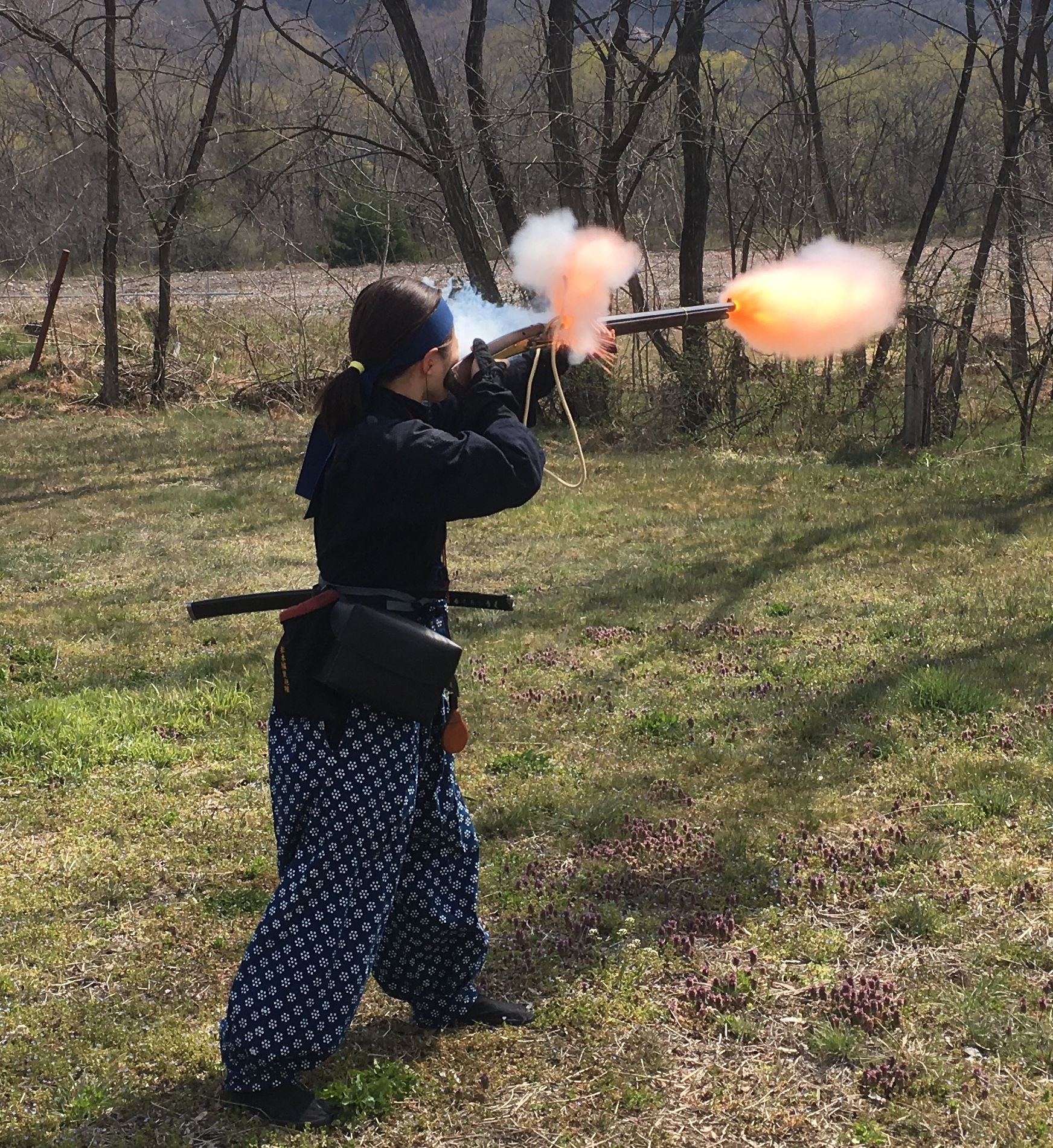
A hōjutsu gunner firing a tanegashima matchlock.

The ashigaru were the lowest class of soldier in feudal Japan and were formed as militia units during times of conflict. The arrival of guns in Japan in 1543 greatly increased the capability of the ashigaru units on the battlefield. Prior to the introduction of firearms, these men would often have to wield polearms and spears like yari or learn to fight with swords and bows. The matchlock, or tanegashima by comparison was easier to use. It did not rely on physical strength or regular practice to be effective. In addition the firearms could be stockpiled in great numbers when not required. As such, samurai and professional soldiers would train the lower classes in hōjutsu.

== See also ==
- Kayakujutsu
- Tanegashima (gun)
