= Kotō-ryū =

School of Japanese martial arts

Kotō-ryū (虎倒流) is a school of Japanese martial arts that specialises in koppōjutsu (骨法術). Kotō-ryū was founded by Sakagami Tarō Kunishige (坂上太郎国重) in the Muromachi period (1392–1573), originating from Gyokko-ryū. The sōke title was claimed to be passed down to Yukio Noguchi from Masaaki Hatsumi (1931–) who received it from Toshitsugu Takamatsu (1889–1972).
