= Masaaki Hatsumi =

Ninjutsu instructor

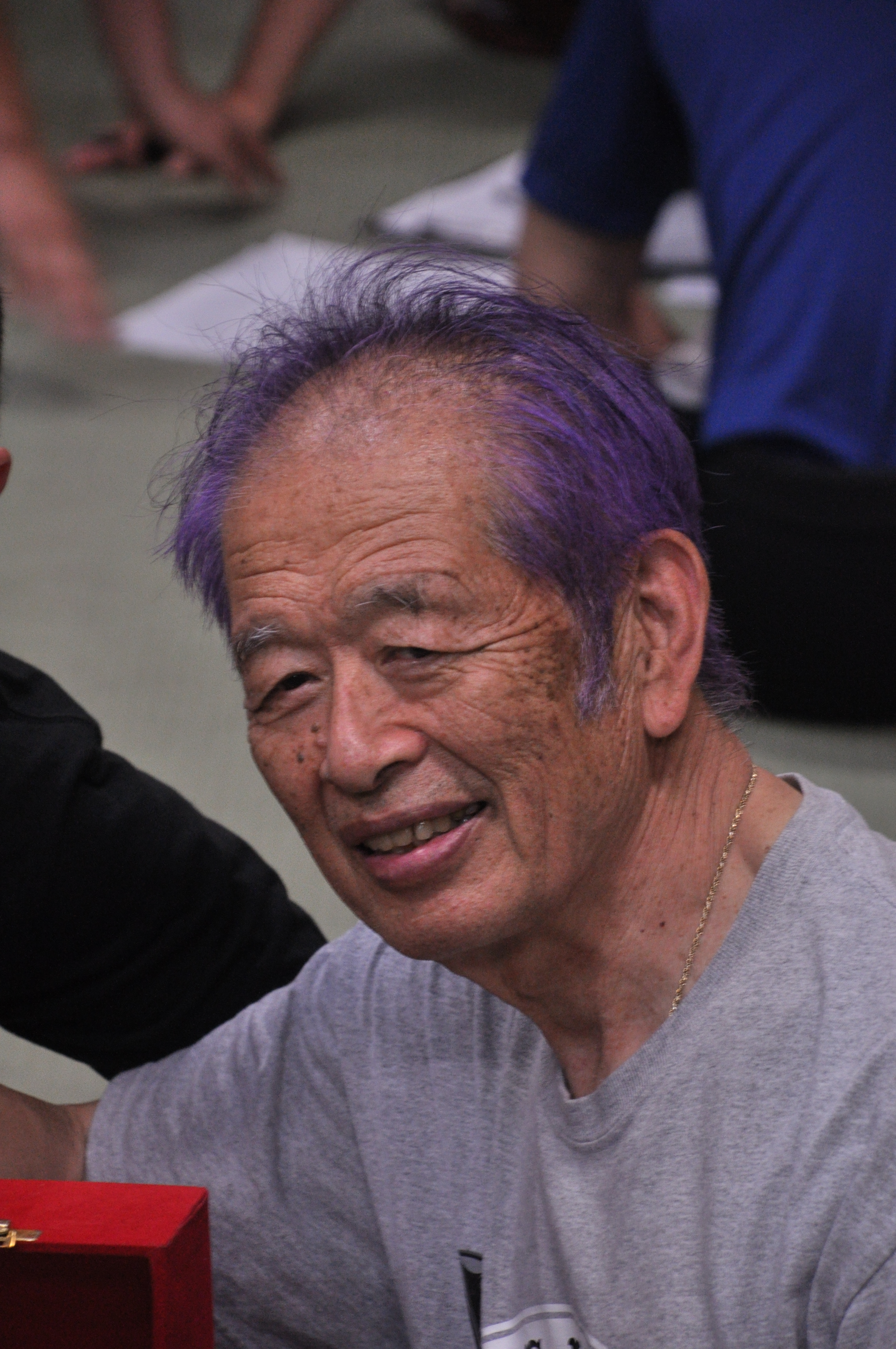
- Born: December 2, 1931 (age 94)
- Style: Ninjutsu
- Teacher: Toshitsugu Takamatsu
- Rank: Sōke

Masaaki Hatsumi (初見 良昭; born Yoshiaki Hatsumi on December 2, 1931) is a Japanese martial artist best known as the founder of the Bujinkan organization and the 34th Togakure-ryū ninjutsu grandmaster (soke). He studied various martial arts before becoming the student and successor of Toshitsugu Takamatsu. Hatsumi dedicated his life to preserving and teaching nine traditional Japanese martial lineages, collectively known as Bujinkan Budō Taijutsu. Through books, seminars, and international outreach, he introduced authentic ninjutsu principles to a global audience. His teachings emphasize natural movement, adaptability, and spiritual discipline, shaping modern perceptions of historical ninja traditions. He is no longer active as a teacher and passed over his grandmaster titles to his students.

== Early life ==
Masaaki Hatsumi was born in Noda, Chiba, on December 2, 1931. During his school years, he participated heavily in sports, along with martial arts and theater, and became "captain of the football team." While attending Meiji University, he continued learning judo and eventually rose to the rank of black belt. He also began teaching judo during his time at the university to American soldiers at the nearby Yokota Air Base. After graduating, Hatsumi searched for a teacher to further his study of martial arts. He began his kobudo training under Chosui Ueno. When he was 26 he met Ueno's teacher, Toshitsugu Takamatsu, known as "the Tiger of Mongolia." Hatsumi was accepted as Takamatsu's student and spent fifteen years learning various ninjutsu styles from Takamatsu and his family, while he continued to study judo, Shito Ryu karate, aikido, and kobudo.

Takamatsu died in Nara in 1972, after advancing Hatsumi from student to grandmaster, and bestowing on him "all the art of the nine schools" and the grandmaster's scrolls, three of which he indicated were of ancient ninja schools and six of samurai jujutsu schools of martial arts. Hatsumi went on to found the Bujinkan Dojo in Noda, to teach the nine schools to other students. His first trip to the United States was in 1982 and he has since continued to participate in yearly ninjutsu taikai (gatherings) around the world.

Hatsumi also worked as a seikotsu-in (整骨院) bonesetter after his graduation, and was chairman of the Writers Guild of Japan at one point in time. He was the writer of a martial arts magazine Tetsuzan, which was distributed in 18 countries.

== Schools ==
Hatsumi inherited the position of sōke (grandmaster) of nine ryū (schools of martial arts):

- Togakure-ryū (戸隠流)
- Gyokko-ryū (玉虎流)
- Kuki Shinden Happō Biken Jutsu (九鬼神伝流八法秘剣術)
- Kotō-ryū (虎倒流)
- Shinden Fudō-ryū Dakentai Jutsu (神伝不動流打拳体術)
- Takagi Yōshin-ryū Jūtai Jutsu (高木揚心流柔体術)
- Gikan-ryū Koppō Jutsu (義鑑流骨法術)
- Gyokushin-ryū Ninpō (玉心流忍法)
- Kumogakure-ryū Ninpō (雲隠流忍法)

At around the time of Hatsumi's 88th birthday on 2 December 2019, he announced his successors for most of the above schools:

- Togakure-ryū: Tsutsui Takumi
- Gyokushin-ryū: Kan Jun'ichi
- Kumogakure-ryū: Furuta Kōji
- Kotō-ryū: Noguchi Yukio
- Gyokko-ryū: Ishizuka Tetsuji†
- Kukishin-ryū: Iwata Yoshio
- Shinden Fudō-ryū: Nagato Toshirō
- Takagi Yōshin-ryū: Sakasai Norio
- Gikan-ryū: Sakasai Norio

== Teachings ==
Hatsumi focused Bujinkan training on the "feeling" of technique, or what he termed the feeling of real situations. Hatsumi had a teaching approach that lead Black Belt magazine to call him "wild, funny, unpredictable, and a cross between Charlie Chaplin and Obi-Wan Kenobi."

Hatsumi focused on teaching taijutsu to his students, as the other ninja arts have no need to be practiced in modern times other than for "historical study."

== Films ==
Hatsumi has also served as a martial arts advisor for various film and television productions, including the James Bond movie You Only Live Twice, and in the first film of the popular Japanese series Shinobi no Mono. He also appeared in and was stunt coordinator for the Japanese tokusatsu television series Sekai Ninja Sen Jiraiya, playing the titular hero's mentor and father figure, Tetsuzan Yamaji.

- You Only Live Twice (1967) – Photographic Assistant to Tanaka on Train (uncredited)

== Ninjutsu lineage ==
Hatsumi claims that ninjutsu was developed by Japanese mountain clans, using "esoteric skills and philosophies" brought to Japan by Tang dynasty exiles.

The Iga-ryū Ninja Museum, a privately-owned museum in Japan lists the only legitimate inheritor of authentic ninjutsu as honorary director, Jinichi Kawakami.

The 1978 edition of the Bugei Ryūha Daijiten (Encyclopedia of Martial Arts Styles) includes the full sōke lists for Masaaki Hatsumi's ryūha.

According to Donn Draeger "The late Fujita Seiko was the last of the living ninja, having served in assignments for the Imperial Government during the Taisho and Showa eras. No ninja exist today. Modern authorities such as T. Hatsumi are responsible for most research being done on ninjutsu."

== Criticism of historical claims ==
Modern Togakure-ryu and various historical claims were disseminated by Hatsumi and the Bujinkan organization. Criticisms of the historical accuracy of the Bujinkan's claims of lineage have arisen from several issues of the Bugei Ryūha Daijiten:

- The 1978 edition of the Bugei Ryūha Daijiten states that Toshitsugu Takamatsu's Togakure-ryu "genealogy includes embellishments by referring to data and kuden about persons whose existence is based on written materials and traditions in order to appear older than it actually is."
- The 1969 edition of the Bugei Ryūha Daijiten states that Takamatsu's Togakure-ryu "is a genealogy newly put together by Takamatsu Toshitsugu, who made use of (took advantage of) the popularity of written materials on ninjutsu after the Taishō era" and that "there are many points where it has added embellishments, it has made people whose real existence is based on written records older than is actually the case, and so it is a product of very considerable labor."
- The 1963 edition of the Bugei Ryūha Daijiten states of Takamatsu's Togakure-ryu "this genealogy refers to various written records and oral transmissions and there are many points/places where embellishments have been added and people appearing in the genealogy are also made older than they actually are."

== Awards ==
- 1986 – Instructor of the Year, Black Belt magazine
- 1994 – Hatsumi claims to have received the title of "knight", from the German government; however, the concept of nobility was abolished in Germany in 1919, and there is no such title given out by the German government
- 2000 – International Culture Award, Japan Cultural Promoting Association (physically issued by the Japanese imperial family)
- 2001 – Lifetime Achievement Award, USMA International Hall of Fame
- 2013 – Inducted into the CBME's Dutch National Hall of Fame

== Publications ==
- Masaaki Hatsumi, The Complete Ninja: The Secret World Revealed (2014), Kodansha International, ISBN 978-1568365473
- Masaaki Hatsumi, The Essence of Budo, The Secret Teachings of the Grandmaster (2011), Kodansha International, ISBN 978-4-7700-3107-5
- Masaaki Hatsumi, Unarmed Fighting Techniques of the Samurai (2008), Kodansha International, ISBN 978-4-7700-3059-7
- Masaaki Hatsumi, Japanese Sword Fighting (2006), Kodansha International, ISBN 978-4-7700-2198-4
- Masaaki Hatsumi, Advanced Stick Fighting (2005), Kodansha International, ISBN 978-4-7700-2996-6
- Masaaki Hatsumi, The Way of the Ninja (2004), Kodansha International, ISBN 978-4-7700-2805-1
- Masaaki Hatsumi, Ninpo: Wisdom for Life. 1999, Kihon Press, ISBN 978-1-58776-206-2
- Masaaki Hatsumi, Essence of Ninjutsu. The Nine Traditions 1988, Contemporary Books, ISBN 0-8092-4724-0
- Masaaki Hatsumi and Quintin Chambers, Stick Fighting (1981), Kodansha International, ISBN 978-0-87011-475-5
