= Shinden Fudo-ryū =

Traditional school of jujutsu

Shinden Fudo-ryū Dakentaijutsu
- Ko-ryū

Foundation
- Founder: Izumo Kanja Yoshiteru
- Date founded: 1113 AD
- Period founded: Yeikyu era

Current information
- Current headmaster: Nagato Toshirō

Arts taught
- Art: Description
- Dakentaijutsu: Hybrid art
- Jutaijutsu: Hybrid art

Ancestor schools
- Historic Chinese martial arts, various medieval Japanese martial arts

Descendant schools
- Genbukan, Jinenkan, Bujinkan, Akban

Shinden Fudo-ryū (Immovable Heart School) was a school of Japanese martial arts.

Founded in around 1113 AD by Izumo Kanja Yoshiteru, Shinden Fudō ryū is one of the oldest styles of Jujutsu. It focuses on working with one's natural surroundings, and as such most training takes place outside using natural objects as training aids. The school puts emphasis on fighting from any posture one finds themselves in at the time a fight begins, rather than needing to prepare by getting into a stance first. This allows the practitioner to remain receptive to sudden attacks. As an extension of this principle, the school has no formal stance (kamae); all techniques start from a natural, loose, standing posture. The curriculum is entirely unarmed; there are no weapons used in this system.

It was a blend of Indigenous Japanese and Chinese styles (primarily Japanese). It was not one of the styles studied by Edward William Barton-Wright, the founder of Bartitsu, and one of the first Westerners to practice Japanese martial arts. The style studied by William Barton-Wright was Shinden Fudō ryū Kempo, which is not connected to the Shinden Fudō ryū Dakentaijutsu.
