= Tojutsu =

Tōjutsu (刀術, tou-jutsu) translates literally as "sword techniques". Tō is a very general Japanese word for sword, and has no connotations with particular sizes, lengths or styles except that it implies the curvature of the blade, like the European sabres. The term Tōjutsu is rarely used or mentioned in martial arts sources. Tōjutsu is encompassed by, and often confused with Kenjutsu, which is the Japanese word representing use of the straight-bladed swords.
