= AKBAN =

Martial arts school

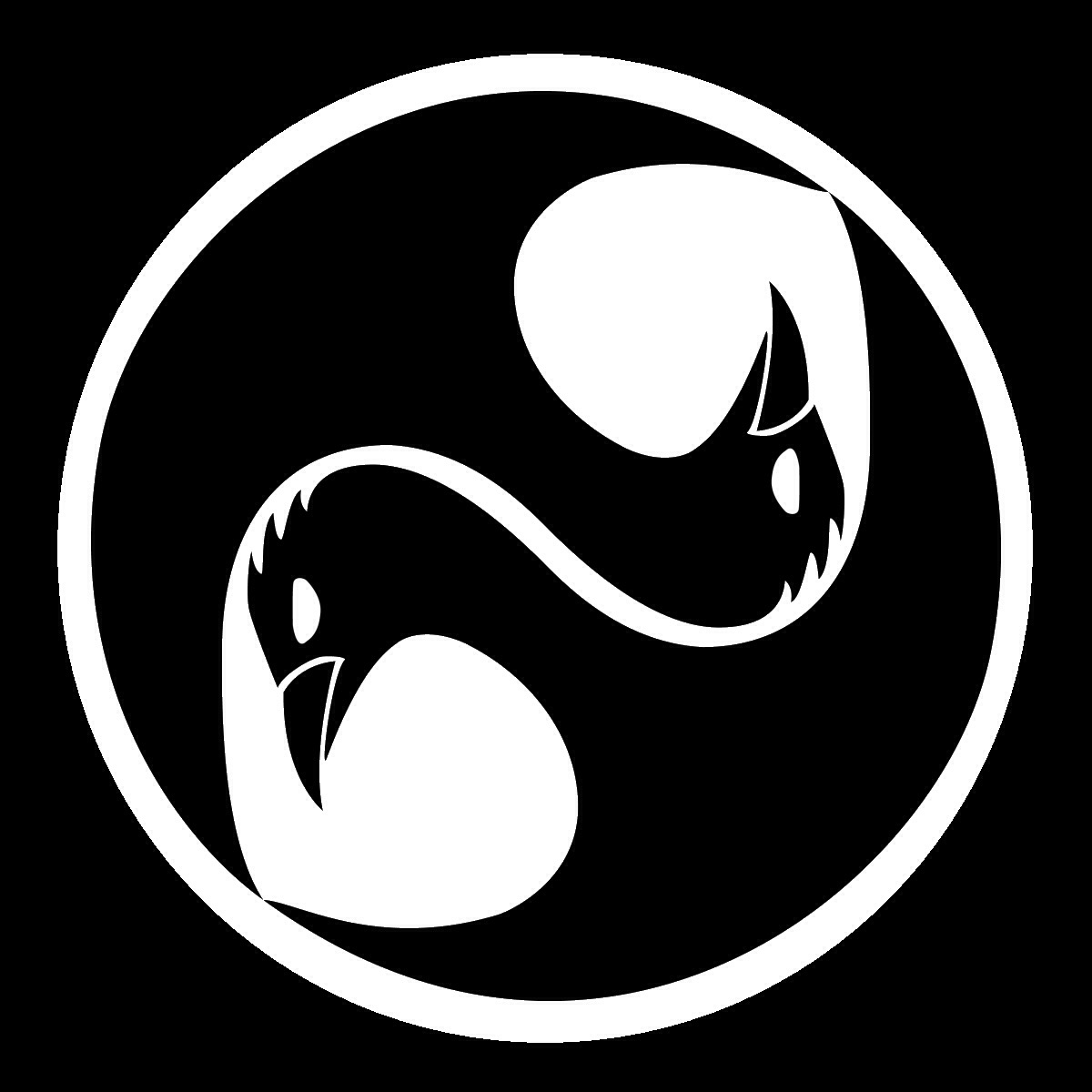
- The AKBAN Kamon
- Date founded: 1986
- Country of origin: Israel
- Founder: Yossi Sheriff
- Arts taught: Ninjutsu
- Ancestor schools: Bujinkan
- Official website: www.akban.org

AKBAN is a martial arts school founded in Israel in 1986. The name AKBAN corresponds to the Arabic عقبان (ʿuqbān), meaning 'eagles' or 'hawks' (plural of عقاب ʿuqāb), which is reflected in the organization's logo featuring two birds of prey.

The school was founded as a Bujinkan Ninjutsu academy with a curriculum that includes martial arts, fitness training, and emotional regulation. The curriculum has diversified to include Historical European martial arts, MMA and Brazilian Jiu Jitsu while maintaining traditional Japanese martial arts elements. AKBAN operates dojos in Israel, Europe, and North America. The school has been involved in search and rescue operations, with Israeli media reporting on AKBAN's volunteer rescue team activities.

== History ==
AKBAN was founded in 1986 in Jerusalem by Yossi Sheriff, a student of Doron Navon. Navon was the first non-Japanese to receive the rank of Shihan in the Bujinkan Ninjutsu organization.

In 1992, AKBAN collaborated with Bujinkan Israel to develop Israel's first state-sanctioned Ninjutsu instructor certification course.

== Training approach ==
According to a 2013 interview with Shinobi Exchange magazine, AKBAN founder Yossi Sheriff described fitness as "a necessary prerequisite to everything we do," noting that the school maintains traditional sparring and fitness regimens that were historically part of Bujinkan training.

Shinobi Exchange reported that Sheriff stated AKBAN veterans should be able to "easily run half marathon" and participate in an annual 24-hour continuous sparring event. The curriculum incorporates instruction from guest teachers in related martial arts, including Brazilian Jiu-Jitsu practitioners Renzo Gracie and Ricardo de la Riva.

The school has been described by Israeli media as having lengthy training requirements, with candidates typically training 12-13 years before black belt examination.

== International locations ==
AKBAN-affiliated clubs advertise training in Tel Aviv, Israel, Berlin, Germany, Santiago, Chile, Athens, Greece, and Canada.

The organization has also been noted for community service activities, with reports of AKBAN members participating in search and rescue operations.

== Documentation project ==
AKBAN maintains a Creative Commons-licensed martial arts encyclopedia launched in 1998. The project began as a database for organizing traditional Japanese martial arts techniques and has evolved to include thousands of articles and instructional videos covering martial arts, fitness, and emotional regulation topics.

== 24-hour sparring events ==
AKBAN has organized extended sparring events, including attempts at endurance records. In October 2002, Israeli media reported on the school's attempt to set a Guinness World Record for continuous martial arts sparring. The event was completed with participants sparring for 15 hours continuously.
