= Boryaku =

Bōryaku (謀略) is one of the 18 fundamental skills of the Togakure-ryū school of ninjutsu.

Alongside more orthodox and mainstream measures, Bōryaku includes use of unorthodox strategies and tactics, as well as manipulation of politics and exploitation of other current events to assist in subtle influence of the opponent.

== See also ==
- The Art of War
- Electoral fraud
