= Hensōjutsu =

Hensōjutsu (変装術) was a Japanese martial art skill involving disguise, impersonation, and infiltration.

In some ninja clans it was known as the "Shichi Hō De" (七方出), or "seven ways of going" (one form of ninjutsu that has a person play a role much like an actor does in impersonating people). A ninja had to appear either as a priest, samurai, merchant, craftsman, performer, puppeteer, or farmer. To accomplish this, the ninja was a well studied sociologist, observing people in other towns for long periods of time until, just like actors, ninjas could blend into the crowd.

They acted like either one of the major social classes to spy on people. Ninja thus sometimes carried one or two costumes to look like the other classes and kunoichi were specialists at Hensojutsu due to the importance of close contact missions. It also included the art of camouflage, such as mesh covered with leaves, grass, mud, bark etc. It is heavily reliant upon shadows and form manipulation..such as crouching to resemble a rock, twisting to match a bush, and also includes various ways one can "meld" into foliage to virtually disappear.

This is different from other methods in that the ninja needs only to appear like someone else for a short period of time. Ninja typically must learn the character traits of another class quickly and then impersonate the members of that class. For instance, if workers were walking in large numbers toward a worksite, using this skill the ninja observes the worker, copies the same clothing and walking style of the workers, then follows the crowd in just like the other workers. A good ninja ought to be able to impersonate anybody in terms of appearance.

== Animal footprints ==
Part of this was to tie carved wooden pads to the feet to lay tracks of animals or children so the ninja could not be tracked easily. Impressions of birds, wolves and many other animals would have been used.

== Tonpo ==
Hensōjutsu is a sub-category of the "thirty methods of becoming invisible/escape" - it is a part of the Jintonpō (人遁法) - or "Use of People Method of attaining invisibility".

== See also ==
- Covert operation
- Clandestine operation
- Espionage
- Grey man theory
