= Tenmon =

Ninja meteorological art

Tenmon (天門, Tenmon) is the ninja art of understanding and using meteorology as a strategic weapon. It allowed ninja to foresee weather changes and to use them as an advantage. By knowing nature's changes, animal behaviour, or atmospheric/astronomic signs, one could use rainy weather or a hot sunny period as strategic elements to weaken and defeat the enemy.

== See also ==
- Military strategy
