= Kayakujutsu =

Kayakujutsu (火薬術, literally "the art of gunpowder") is the use of firearms, gunpowder and explosives especially by ninja. The history and mythology surrounding ninjutsu and kayakujutsu are similar to the history of chemistry and the mythology surrounding alchemy. Thus kayakujutsu mysticism refers to elements like the Earth (Chi) to develop Fire (Kaji) just as alchemy referred to elements just as air, earth, fire and water.

== See also ==
- Hōjutsu
- Weapons training
