= Gyokko-ryū =

School of Japanese martial arts

Gyokko-ryū (Japanese: 玉虎流) is a school of Japanese martial arts that specialises in kosshijutsu (骨指術), shitōjutsu (指頭術) and ninjutsu (忍法). Gyokko-ryū was founded by Tozawa Hakuunsai Hogen (戸沢白雲斎, 1156–1159) in the Heian period (794–1192). The sōke title is claimed to be passed down to Tetsuji Ishizuka from Masaaki Hatsumi (1931–) who in turn received it from Toshitsugu Takamatsu (1889–1972). Tetsuji Ishizuka has died on March 15, 2025, no successor has been appointed yet.
