= Taijutsu =

Japanese martial art

Taijutsu (体術)
- Also known as: Taijitsu
- Focus: Hybrid, grappling, striking
- Country of origin: Japan
- Parenthood: Judo, aikido, karate, kenpō
- Olympic sport: No

Taijutsu (体術; literally "body technique" or "body skill") is a Japanese martial art blanket term for any combat skill, technique, or system of martial art using body movements that are described as an empty-hand combat skill or system. Taijutsu is a synonym for jujutsu (method of close combat either unarmed or with minor weapons), and the words jujutsu, taijutsu, and yawara can be used interchangeably. The term is commonly used when referring to traditional Japanese martial arts but has also been used in the naming of modern martial arts such as Bujinkan Budo Taijutsu. Taijutsu is similar to karate but is more focused on the body techniques. More specific names than taijutsu are typically used when describing a martial art: judo (focusing on throwing, taking of balance and grappling), aikido (focusing on harmonizing, throwing, and joint locks) as well as karate and kenpō (focusing through striking).

== In popular culture ==
- The Japanese anime and manga Naruto mentions Taijutsu as one of the three basic ninja methods, the others being Ninjutsu and Genjutsu based on the Japanese Buddhist and Shinto philosophy of Godai.

== See also ==
- AKBAN
- Bujinkan
- To-Shin Do
- Ninjutsu
