= Sōke =

Japanese term

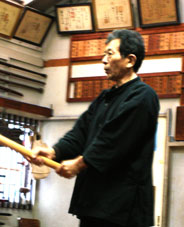
The sōke Yoshimitsu Katsue.

Sōke (宗家), pronounced [soːke], is a Japanese term that means "the head family [house]." In the realm of Japanese traditional arts, it is used synonymously with the term iemoto. Thus, it is often used to indicate "headmaster" (or sometimes translated as "head of the family" or even "grand master".) The English translation of sōke as "grand master" is not a literal translation but it does see use by some Japanese sources. It can mean one who is the leader of any school or the master of a style, but it is most commonly used as a highest level Japanese title, referring to the singular leader of a school or style of martial art. The term, however, is not limited to the genre of martial arts.

Sōke is sometimes mistakenly believed to mean "founder of a style" because many modern sōke are the first generation headmasters of their art (shodai sōke), and are thus both sōke and founder. However, the successors to the shodai sōke are also sōke themselves. Sōke are generally considered the ultimate authority within their art, and have final discretion and authority regarding promotions, curriculum, doctrine, and disciplinary actions. A sōke has the authority to issue a menkyo kaiden certificate indicating that someone has mastered all aspects of his style.

In some schools such as Kashima-Shinryu there is a related position called Shihanke (師範家 hiragana: しはんけ) meaning "Instructor Line" that fills a very similar role. A Shihanke is essentially a second training lineage that exists autonomously from the Sōke. In arts where there is a Shihanke and a Sōke it is possible for the position of Sōke to essentially be a hereditary honorary title in the Iemoto system while the Shihanke is responsible for the actual teaching and operation of the school

The widespread use of the term "sōke" is controversial in the martial arts community. Traditionally it was used very rarely in Japan, typically only for very old martial arts, although it has become a somewhat common term for headmasters of schools created in the last few decades that attempt to reconstruct or emulate older styles of martial arts. Some modern western sōke have used the title Sōke-dai (宗家代) as a title for their assistant as the leader of their school. The Japanese character dai used in this context translates as "in place of." Thus, a shihan-dai, sōke-dai, or sōke-dairi means "someone who teaches in temporary place of" the main instructor, for reasons such as the incapacity of the sōke due to injuries or illnesses.

== See also ==
- Doshu
- Grandmaster (martial arts)
- Sensei
