= Czech hedgehog =

Static anti-tank obstacle defense

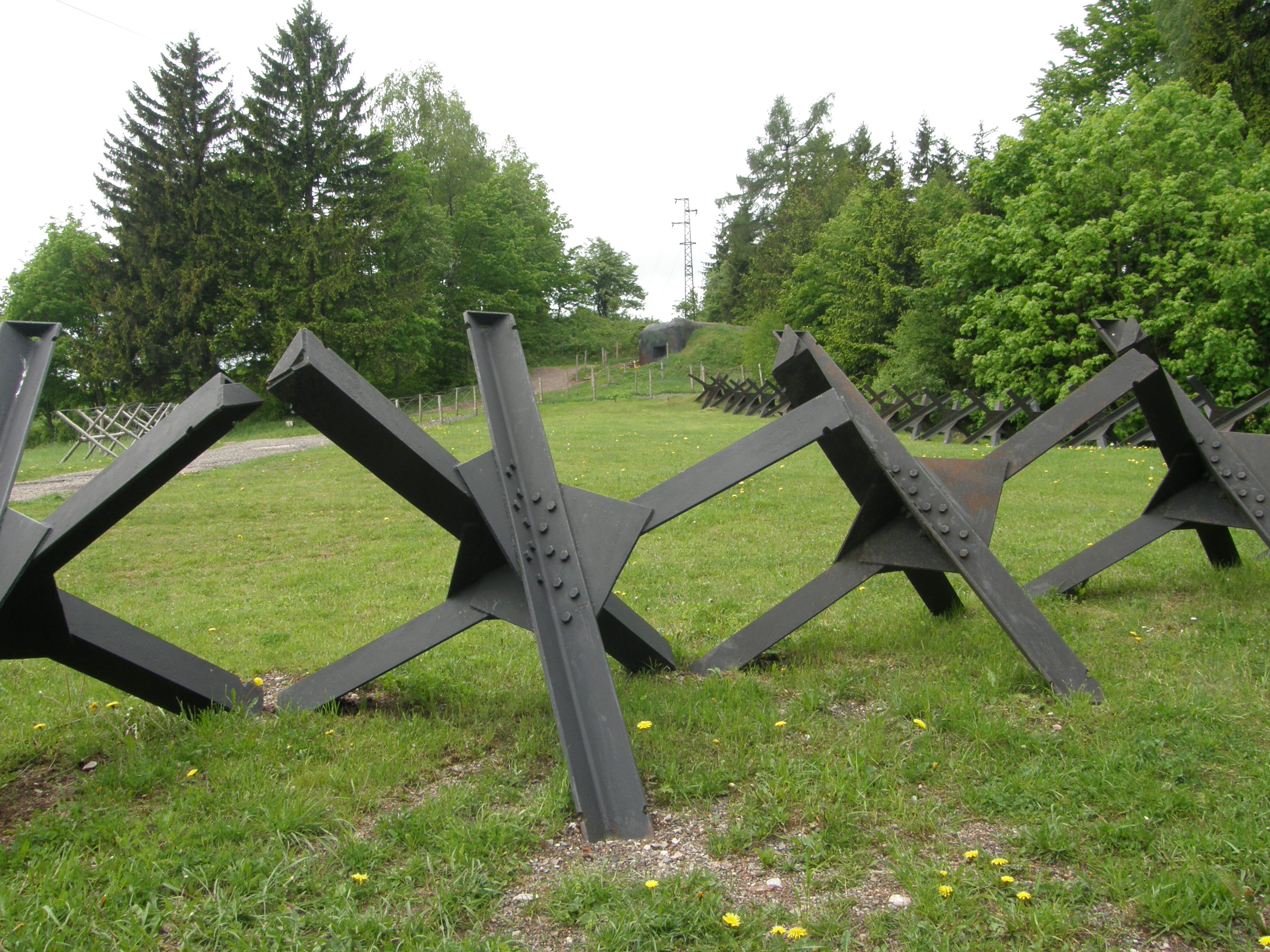
Czech hedgehogs deployed at the Stachelberg fortress in the Czech Republic

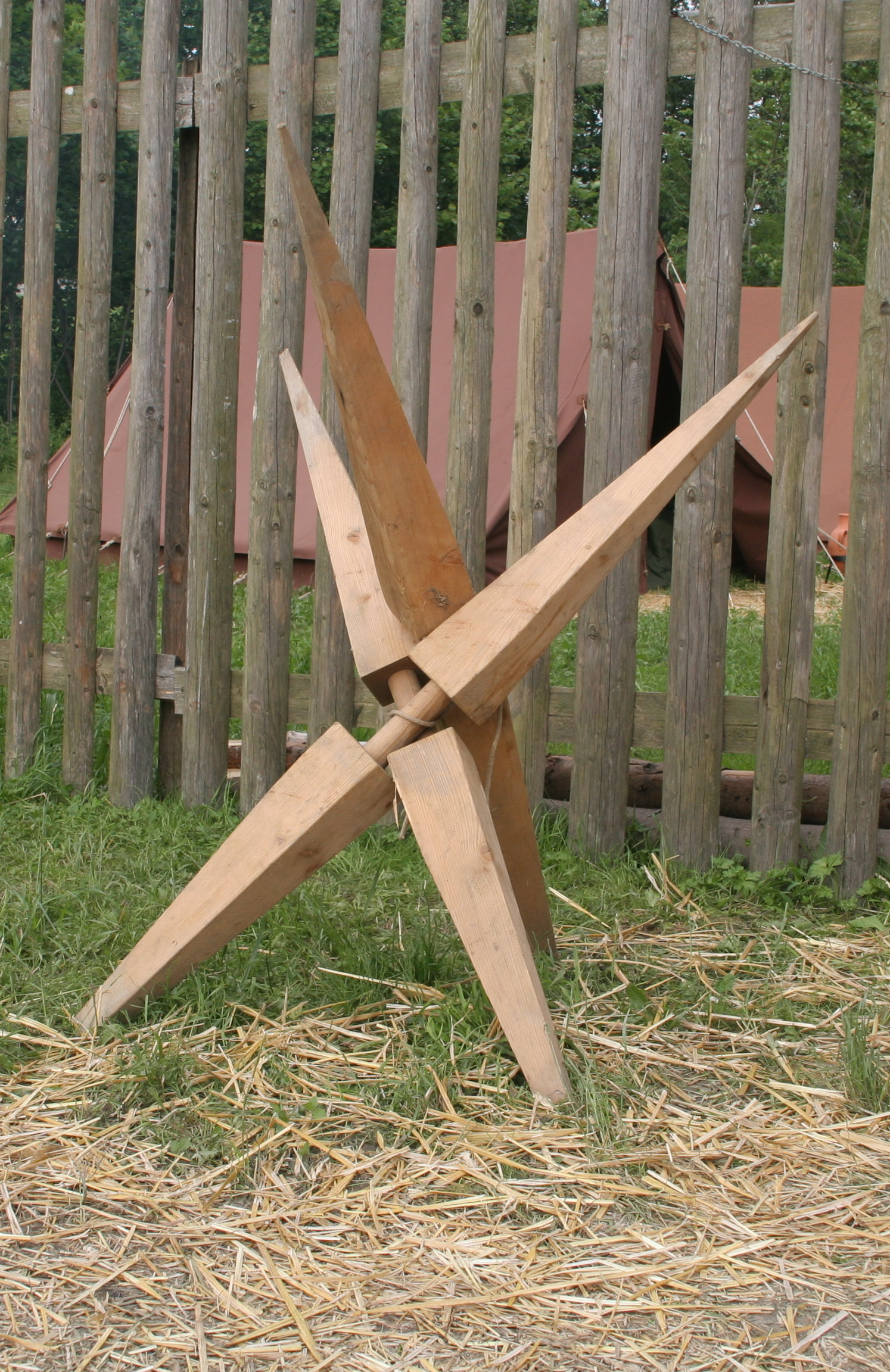
Ancient Roman sudes arranged to resemble a Czech hedgehog

The Czech hedgehog (Czech: rozsocháč or ježek) is a static anti-tank obstacle defense made of metal angle beams or I-beams (that is, lengths with an L- or I-shaped cross section). It is similar in shape to metal knucklebones, although on a much larger scale. The hedgehog is very effective in keeping light to medium tanks and vehicles from penetrating a line of defense; it maintains its function even when tipped over by a nearby explosion. Although Czech hedgehogs may provide some scant cover for attacking infantry, infantry forces are generally much less effective against fortified defensive positions than mechanized units. Their invention is credited to a Czechoslovak officer, Major František Kašík.

== History ==
=== Origin ===
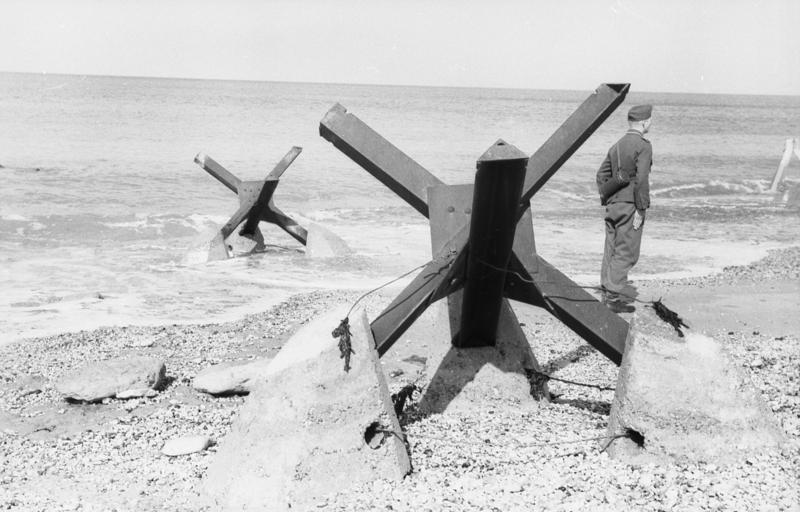
Examples of Czech hedgehogs deployed on the Atlantic Wall in the vicinity of Calais

The Czech hedgehog's name refers to its origin in Czechoslovakia. The hedgehogs were originally used on the Czech–German border by the Czechoslovak border fortifications—a massive but never-completed fortification system that was turned over to Germany in 1938 after the occupation of the Sudetenland as a consequence of the Munich Agreement.

The first hedgehogs were built of reinforced concrete, with a shape similar to later metal versions. However, the concrete hedgehogs proved ineffective during tests as they could be substantially damaged by machine gun fire. Once they were fragmented, the debris provided more cover for enemy infantry than did their metal counterparts. Therefore, only the oldest sections of the Czechoslovak defensive line, built in 1935–1936, were equipped with concrete hedgehogs, and usually only in the second line.

=== World War II ===
The Czech hedgehog was widely used during World War II by the Soviet Union in anti-tank defense. They were produced from any sturdy piece of metal and sometimes wood, like railway sleepers. Czech hedgehogs were especially effective in urban combat, where a single hedgehog could block an entire street. Czech hedgehogs thus became a symbol of "defense at all costs" in the Soviet Union; hence, the memorial to Moscow defenders, built alongside the M-10 highway in 1966, is composed of three giant Czech hedgehogs.

Czech hedgehogs were part of the German defenses of the Atlantic Wall. During the invasion of Normandy, the Allies cut up sizable numbers of intact and wrecked hedgehogs and welded them to the front of their M4 Sherman and M5 Stuart tanks. Known as Rhino tanks, these proved very useful for clearing the hedgerows that made up the bocages across Normandy.

=== Cold War ===
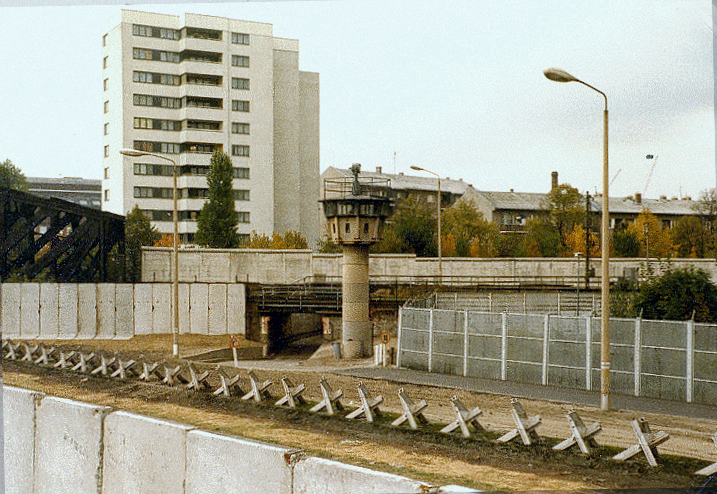
Entry point of the West Berlin S-Bahn into East Berlin near the Berlin Wall in Liesenstrasse/Gartenstrasse, 1980

Postwar tests conducted by the Czechoslovak army proved the low efficiency of the metal hedgehogs against heavy armored vehicles such as the Soviet ISU-152 and T-54 or German Panther. As many as 40% of attempts at breakthrough were successful; therefore, the army developed new anti-tank obstacles for the border fortifications instituted during the Cold War. Nevertheless, the metal hedgehog was still used as a quick road-block against wheeled vehicles.

=== Russo-Ukrainian War ===
In early 2022, during the Russian invasion of Ukraine, hedgehogs were used in conjunction with concrete barriers and other techniques to thwart Russian forces. The Ukrainian Railways repurposed new tracks to make hundreds of hedgehogs at 33 of its own shops and some other sites. The railroad estimated it had enough material for some 1,800 hedgehogs. The Ukrainian military in Odesa, Kyiv and Lviv also made hedgehogs to be distributed to strategic locations. In Kyiv, hedgehogs from WWII were brought out of a museum and used at a roadblock.

== Technical details ==
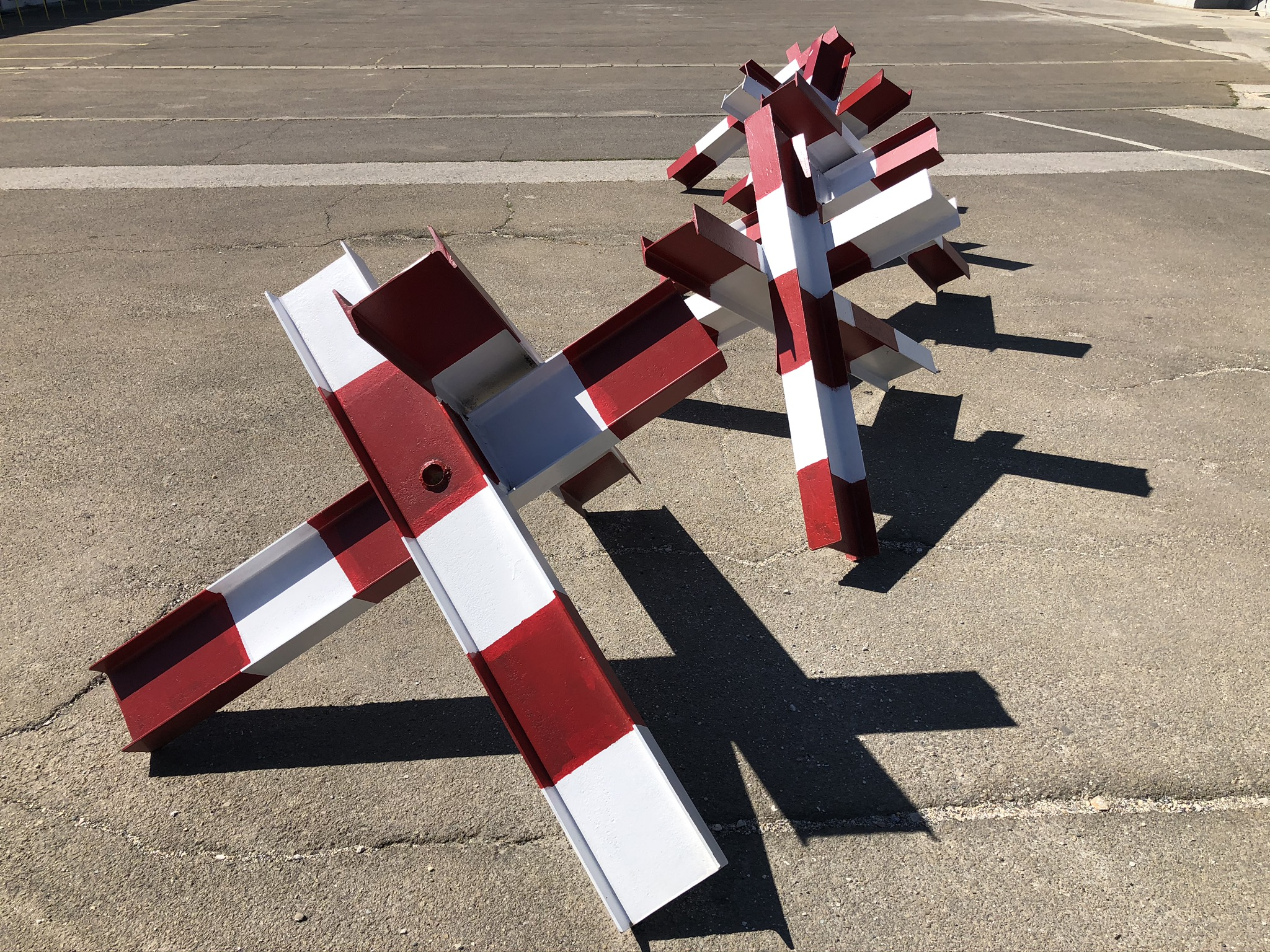
Modern Czech hedgehog in MSU base (Kosovo)

The hedgehog is not generally anchored to prevent movement, as it can be effective even if rolled by a large explosion. Its effectiveness lies in its dimensions, combined with the fact that a vehicle attempting to drive over it will likely become stuck (and possibly damaged) through rolling on top of the lower bar and lifting its treads (or wheels) off the ground.

Industrially manufactured Czech hedgehogs were made of three pieces of metal angle (L 140/140/13 mm, length 1.8 metres (6 ft), weight 198 kilograms (440 lb); later versions: length 2.1 metres (7 ft), weight 240 kilograms (530 lb) joined by gusset plates, rivets and bolts, or welded together into a characteristic spatial three-armed cross with each bar at right angles to the other two, this pattern forming the axes of a cube. Two arms of the hedgehog were connected in the factory, while the third arm was connected on-site by M20 bolts. The arms were equipped with square "feet" to prevent sinking into the ground, as well as notches for attaching barbed wire.

== See also ==
- Caltrop
- Cheval de frise, a portable frame covered with many long iron or wooden spikes used in medieval times to deter cavalry.
- Dragon's teeth (fortification)
- Makibishi
- Sudis, an Ancient Roman stake which may have been lashed together to form a similar fortification
- Tetrapod (structure)
