= Artillery Fort Hůrka =

Czechoslovak fortification in the Czech Republic

- Near Králíky, Czech Republic

Site information
- Type: Artillery fort
- Condition: Museum

Site history
- Built: 1938

Artillery Fort Hůrka is a Czechoslovak fortification located near the town of Králíky in the northeastern Czech Republic. The fort was first built under the name Berghöhe, but the Directorate of Fortification Works decided to use exclusively Czech names, so the name was changed to Horka. The fort is now known as Hůrka, even on official documents; a mystery still surrounds how the fort got the name. The fort was completed shortly before Germany occupied the Sudetenland in September 1938, but never saw combat. Today, the fort is a museum.

== Description ==
Artillery Fort Hůrka consists of 5 reinforced concrete bunkers and a lone observation post. In the Autumn of 1935, a tunnel was dug into the rock to test its durability. At 23m, groundwater started to rush into the tunnel, with the commander stating "the water is increasing, it needs to be pumped constantly". The construction of the fort was awarded to Karel Skorkovský, whose company operated out of Prague and constructed many fortifications for the Czech government. Thousands of cubic meters of concrete and hundreds of tons of steel were used to build the fort. In September 1938, the structure of the fort was completed, but much of the equipment had not been added yet. The fort was equipped with a narrow gauge railway for moving supplies and men around the fort. Much of the original equipment that was installed in the fort before it was occupied by the German in March 1939 remains and has been preserved. The construction of the fort cost 3 workers' lives.

K-Bg-S-10

KS 10, severely damaged from German weapons testing

K-Bg-S-10 is one of the 5 concrete fortifications constructed aboveground in Artillery Fort Hůrka. KS was the designation for the sector, and 10 means it was the 10th bunker in that sector. The Bg stands for Border Guards, who manned the entire fort. Being part of a fort, the bunker was built to a Grade IV resistance standard, meaning it had 3.5m thick walls, and could withstand direct hits from siege guns up to 420mm. Unlike many of the smaller fortifications along Czechoslovakia's borders, KS 10 did not have a conventional entrance accessed from the outside. The bunker was accessed via an elevator or stair from the underground portion of the fort. The bunker was supposed to be armed with a machine gun dome, but it was still being designed by Skoda in September 1938, and thus was never installed. Since then, the shaft for it has sat empty. The bunker was severely damaged by German tests in 1938 and 1939, which tested the resistance of the concrete and possible anti-fortification weapons. In 1940, the bunker was reequipped with so-called “DZ” equipment from the Brno Arms Factory. These were German-designed pieces for fortifications i.e. periscopes, firing embrasures, doors, armored domes. The aim of this was to test how German equipment fared against weapons before being mass-produced. These tests carried on until 1942.

K-Bg-S-11

The heavily damaged KS 11, the 3 vertical terraces are where the planned 100mm guns would have gone.

Artillery Bunker KS 11 was built between 6–10 September and 4–13 October 1937, with the evident purpose of providing housing for artillery. The construction of the building used 5,350 m³ of concrete and an unspecified amount of steel. When the building was completed, it was one of the largest Czech artillery blocks. The bunker measured 48m long, and was only slightly smaller than the other artillery blocks in Czechoslovakia, which used on average 5,500 m³. The main armament was supposed to be 3 vz. 38 100mm howitzers, but these were still under development at Skoda when Germany took control of the fort. Instead, the bunker was armed with 3 75mm mountain guns with an effective range of 8km compared to the estimated 11.7 km of the 100mm guns. The guns were placed in a protective ditch, which was accessed via the bunker. The guns were protected by some wood and camouflaged using camo nets over the top. The emergency exit from the bunker leads to the protective ditch where the mountain guns were placed. A 8ft wide stairwell led down to the underground portion of the fort, while 2 Type IV elevators with a lift capacity of 2,500 kg ran in a separate shaft. After the Munich Agreement in September 1938, Germany fired 210mm shells at the bunker to test weapons.

K-Bg-S-12A

Bunker KS 12A, restored and now part of a museum

KS 12A was the entrance for supplies for Artillery Fort Hůrka. It was the second largest building in the fort, behind the artillery block. The bunker was located behind the hills the fort was built into, in the rear of the hill to protect it from artillery fire. The entrance was closed by 3 different gates. The first was a 240 kg lattice gate, the second was a 6 ton vertical armored gate which could close in 15 seconds, and the third was a 4 ton sliding gate around the corner. This bunker was the only one built out of 5 planned across Czechoslovakia. The Germans used the bunker for weapons testing, and equipped it with their so-called “DZ” equipment for testing.

K-Bg-S-12B

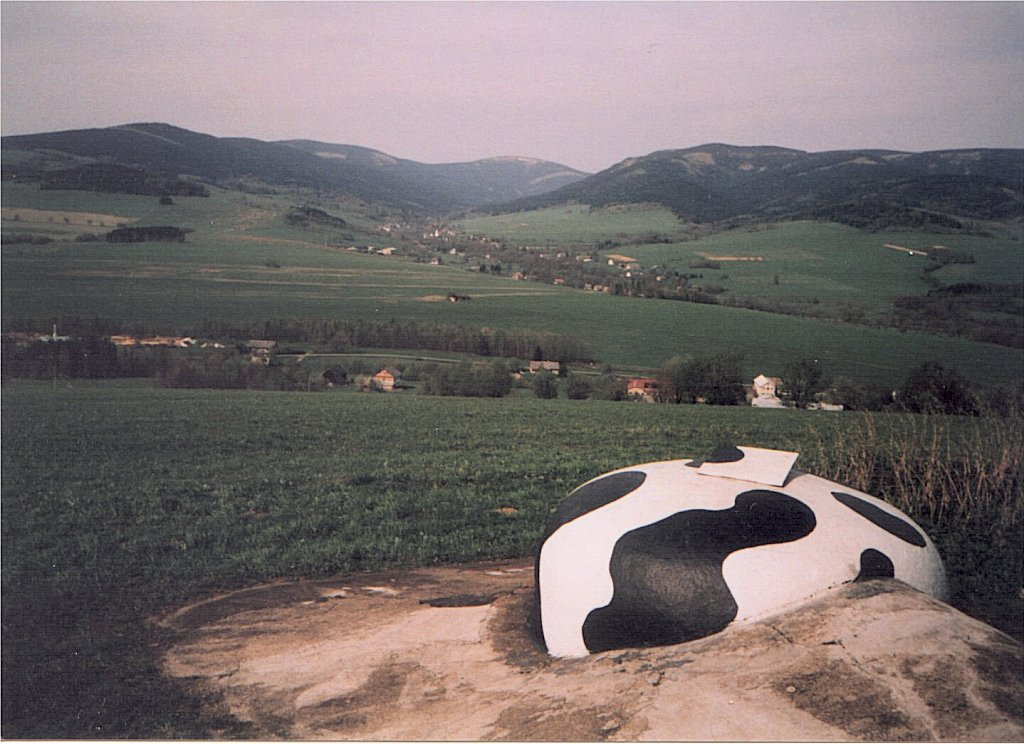
One of two remaining Czechoslovak observation domes

KS 12B is a lone observation post located a few km from Artillery Fort Hůrka. The Germans called the observation post the “Lustberg Object”. The observation post was to mainly serve Fort Hůrka, but also built to serve Artillery Forts Bouda and Adam, as well as an independent artillery block near Branna. The concrete for the structure was poured between Aug. 16 and 21, 1937. The observation post was classified as a Grade III resistance durability, meaning it had 2.5m thick walls and 3m thick roofs. The bunker was garrisoned by 18 men from the border guards, who also garrisoned Artillery Fort Hůrka. It also meant that the observation post could resist direct hits from a 305mm howitzer or mortar. The observation post consumed 1,343 cubic meters of concrete, and was 3 stories tall. Despite being 3 stories tall, almost all of the observation post was below ground. The observation post is the only 3 story observation post in the Czechoslovak border fortifications. The observation post was not meant to fight, which is why they are situated just behind the main defensive line. Since they were not meant to fight, great efforts were made to camouflage the observation post. In 1940, the Germans planned to equip the observation dome with an experimental periscope, which was relocated from the Kummersdorf Proving Grounds to Králíky. However, this was never carried out, and the observation dome was preserved the way it was built.

The bunker's entrance

The observation dome is the only one remaining in Sector III of the border defenses, and is one of a few that remain across the Czech Republic and Slovakia. The observation dome was never armed, and has 4 observation holes. Separate from the main part of the observation dome was a 20mm inner lining which served to stop shell fragments that got through the outer lining. The dome weighed anywhere between 20 and 52 metric tons. On the top of the dome was a vz. 38 10/6 x periscope, which was armored. The dome still shows dents and damage from German tests conducted between 1938 and 1940.

K-Bg-S-13

The heavily damaged KS 13

KS 13 is one of only 2 3 story infantry bunkers in what was formerly Czechoslovakia, the other being the unfinished T-S72 bunker in the Artillery Fort Stachelberg. KS 13 is the second largest built infantry bunker in what was once Czechoslovakia. The 3 story layout was due to the steep hills, which meant the bunker could not be wider. The bunker was also heavily armed, on the left side there was fittings for 2 twin-gunned heavy machine gun domes, in the center there was an observation dome with a light machine gun, and on the right there was fittings for 2 domes for 1 light machine gun each. The bunker's crew was 37 men, who accessed the bunker from an underground shaft connected to the main complex. The bunker was built to a Grade IV resistance durability, meaning it could withstand direct hits from a 420mm siege gun.

== History ==
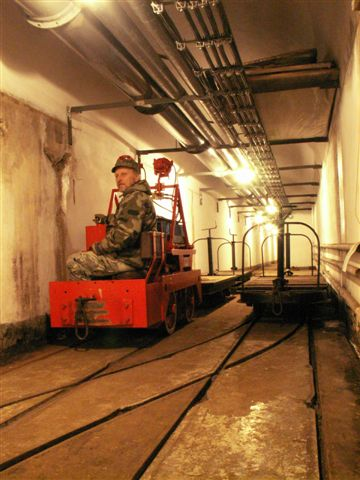
A museum worker drives a small engine on the short-gauge track running throughout the tunnels of the fort.

Artillery Fort Hůrka was built in response to the growing Fascism in Germany in the 1930s. The Czechs worried that Hitler would try to take over their country, so they built state of the art border defenses modeled on the French Maginot Line. One of those defenses modeled off the French was the artillery fort. The fort's jobs were to provide artillery support for the more numerous independent bunkers commonly built along frontiers. The construction of Artillery Fort Hůrka began in 1935 with the testing of the rock to see if it was durable enough. Most of the bunkers were constructed in the late summer and early fall of 1937. By September 1938, 1.75km of underground passageways and 5 heavily reinforced concrete bunkers had been built.

The fort was not completed before Nazi Germany took control of the area in the Munich Agreement. Adolf Hitler, as well as the heads of the Wehrmacht personally visited the fort and toured it. Many stayed around, including Hitler, for the weapons tests conducted by German engineers. German engineers tested the Czechoslovak constructions with 210mm guns, experimental anti-fortification weapons, and explosive gas. KS 11 was fired at by 210mm guns to test the durability of the concrete, and whether the recipe should be used in German fortifications. Röchling shells were tested on some of the bunkers, and summarily they were put into production. One of the bunkers was filled with the explosive gas Taifun, which after being filled was detonated. In 1940, the Brno Arms Factory equipped the bunkers with so-called "DZ" equipment, which was German-designed fortification equipment. Tests on the bunkers lasted between May 1940 and 1942. The findings from these tests were later used to help construct the Atlantic Wall.

Towards the end of the war, an arms company called FAMO relocated to the fort, and planned to utilize the underground portion of the fort for arms production. In Nov 1944, construction of a camp was underway, which was meant to house slave labor from the Gross Roben Concentration Camp. These prisoners were meant to produce the weapons, but the necessary machinery for arms production never made it to the fort, and the slave labor camp was not finished before Soviet forces overran the area in April 1945.

Between March and May 1948, the fort was cleaned up. 600 cubic metres (21,000 cu ft) of debris was removed and 329 pieces of unexploded German ordnance was defused and removed. In 1956, Artillery Fort Hůrka was renovated to be an ammunition depot. The fort was equipped with air conditioning, as well as its own 40 Kw diesel generator. In 1961, the fort was inspected by the Ministry of the Interior, which had hoped to repurpose the fort as a protected workplace, but found the fort too leaky and wet. The fort summarily went on as an ammo depot. This had an unexpected benefit, regular maintenance. During Czechoslovakia's communist government, the fort was restored to its former glory, being reconstructed from the original plans of the fort. Despite this, some of the bunkers still show signs of damage, and one, KS 13, is severely damaged. The fort was an ammo depot until 2008. Today, Artillery Fort Hůrka is part of the Králíky fortress complex, alongside the nearby Bouda Artillery Fort. Both have been turned into museums and can be toured.
