= Caltrop =

Area-denial weapon

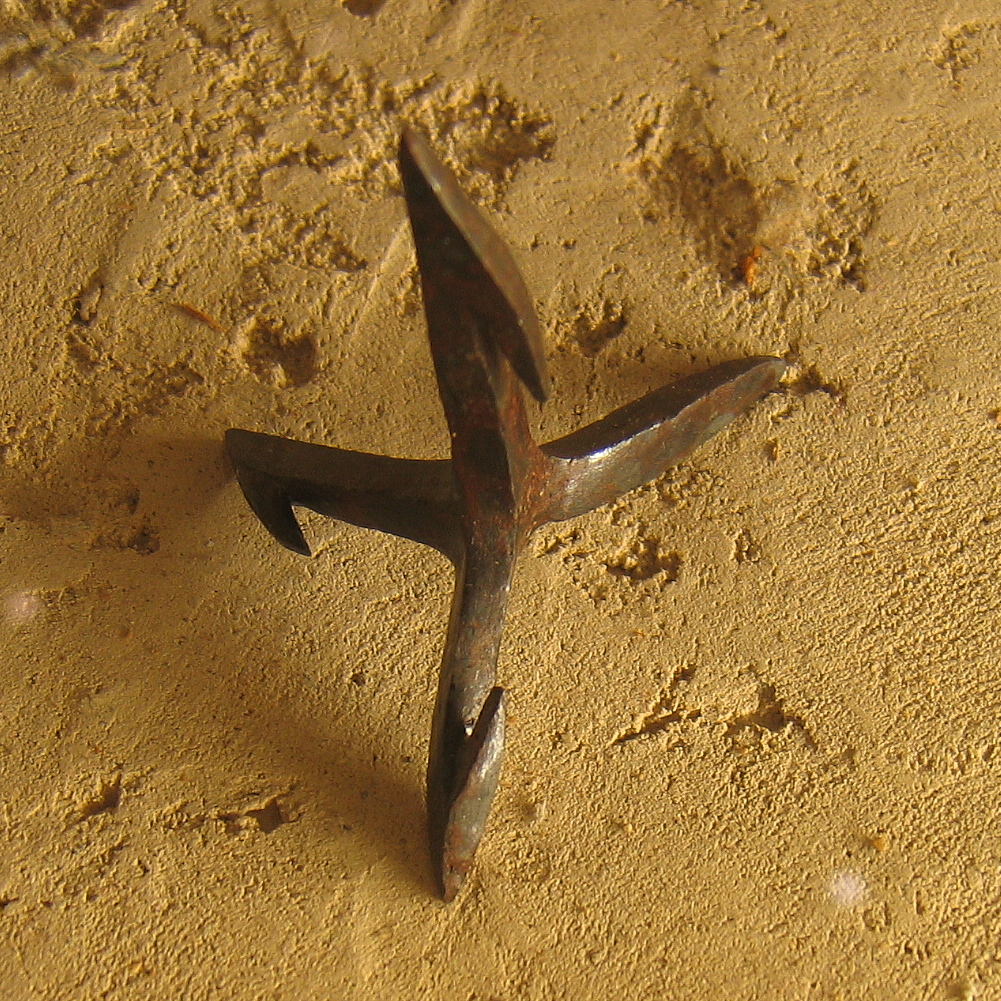
Roman caltrop at the Westphalian Museum of Archeology (German: Westfälisches Museum für Archäologie), Herne, North Rhine-Westphalia, Germany

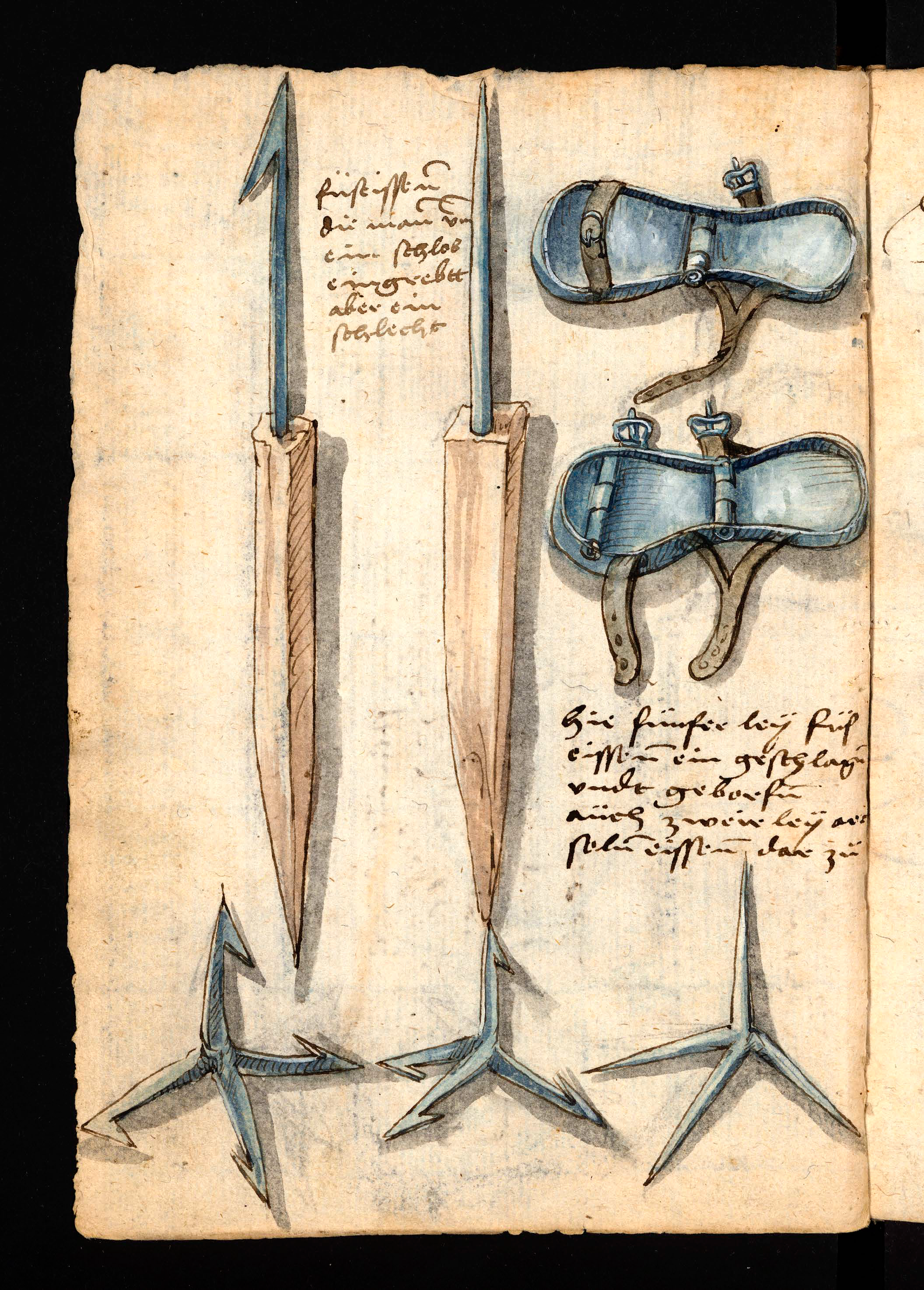
Different types of caltrops and metal soles that can be buckled underneath as a countermeasure from Codex Löffelholz, Nuremberg, 1505

A caltrop (/ˈkæl.tɹəp, ˈkal.-, ˈkɔːl.-/; also known as caltrap, galtrop, cheval trap, galthrap, galtrap, calthrop, jackrock or crow's foot) is an area denial weapon made up of usually four, but possibly more, sharp nails or spines arranged in such a manner that one of them always points upward from a stable base (for example, a regular tetrahedron). Historically, caltrops were part of defences that served to slow the advance of troops, especially horses, chariots, and war elephants, and were particularly effective against the soft feet of camels. In modern times, caltrops are effective when used against wheeled vehicles with pneumatic tyres.

== Name ==
The modern name "caltrop" is derived from the Old English calcatrippe (heel-trap), such as in the French usage chausse-trape (shoe-trap). The Latin word tribulus originally referred to this and provides the generic name of a plant commonly called the caltrop, Tribulus terrestris.

== History ==
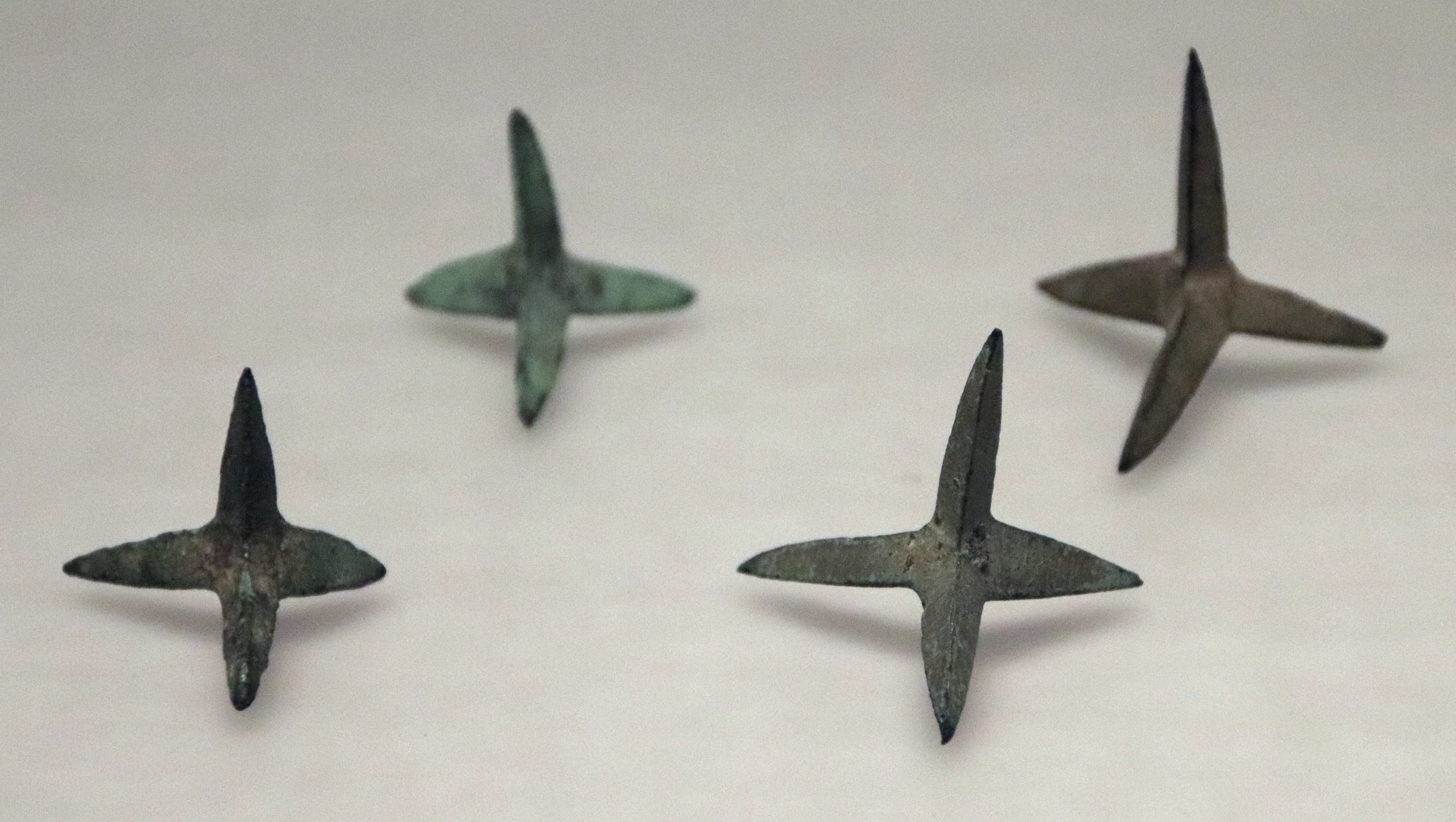
Bronze caltrops from the Three Kingdoms era

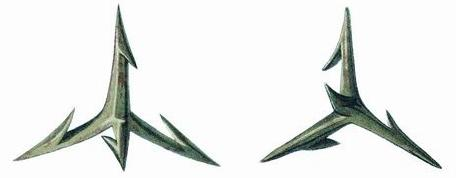
A 16th-century caltrop

Illustration from the 18th-century Chinese book Gujin Tushu Jicheng, showing caltrops with spikes that stick in the ground

The caltrop was called tribulus by the ancient Romans, or sometimes murex ferreus, the latter meaning "jagged iron" (literally "iron spiny snail-shell"). The former term derives from the ancient Greek word tribolos meaning three spikes.

The late Roman writer Vegetius, referring in his work De re militari to scythed chariots, wrote:

The armed chariots used in war by Antiochus and Mithridates at first terrified the Romans, but they afterwards made a jest of them. As a chariot of this sort does not always meet with plain and level ground, the least obstruction stops it. And if one of the horses be either killed or wounded, it falls into the enemy's hands. The Roman soldiers rendered them useless chiefly by the following contrivance: at the instant the engagement began, they strewed the field of battle with caltrops, and the horses that drew the chariots, running full speed on them, were infallibly destroyed. A caltrop is a device composed of four spikes or points arranged so that in whatever manner it is thrown on the ground, it rests on three and presents the fourth upright.

Another example of the use of caltrops was found in Jamestown, Virginia, in the United States:

Undoubtedly the most unusual weapon or military device surviving from seventeenth-century Virginia is known as a caltrop, a single example of which has been found at Jamestown. It amounts to a widely spread iron tripod about three inches long with another leg sticking vertically upward, so that however you throw it down, one spike always sticks up. ... The fact that only one has been found would seem to suggest that they were used little, if at all. As with all military equipment designed for European wars, the caltrop's presence in Virginia must be considered in the light of possible attacks by the Spaniards as well as assaults from the Indians.

In China, caltrop is called Jili(蒺藜) and comes in different shapes and materials. It is thrown on the ground to stop people and horses, and sometimes it is coated with poison. Some styles are also called Jizhuading(雞爪釘) because they resemble chicken claws.

The Japanese version of the caltrop is called makibishi. Makibishi were sharp spiked objects that were used in feudal Japan to slow pursuers and also were used in the defence of samurai fortifications. Iron makibishi were called tetsubishi, while the makibishi made from the dried seed pod of the water caltrop, or water chestnut (genus Trapa), formed a natural type of makibashi called tennenbishi. Both types of makibishi could penetrate the thin soles of shoes, such as the waraji sandals, which were commonly worn in feudal Japan.

As a protective measure and countermeasure, European late medieval military engineers proposed iron soles that could be strapped under shoes like pattens to protect the feet from hidden traps.

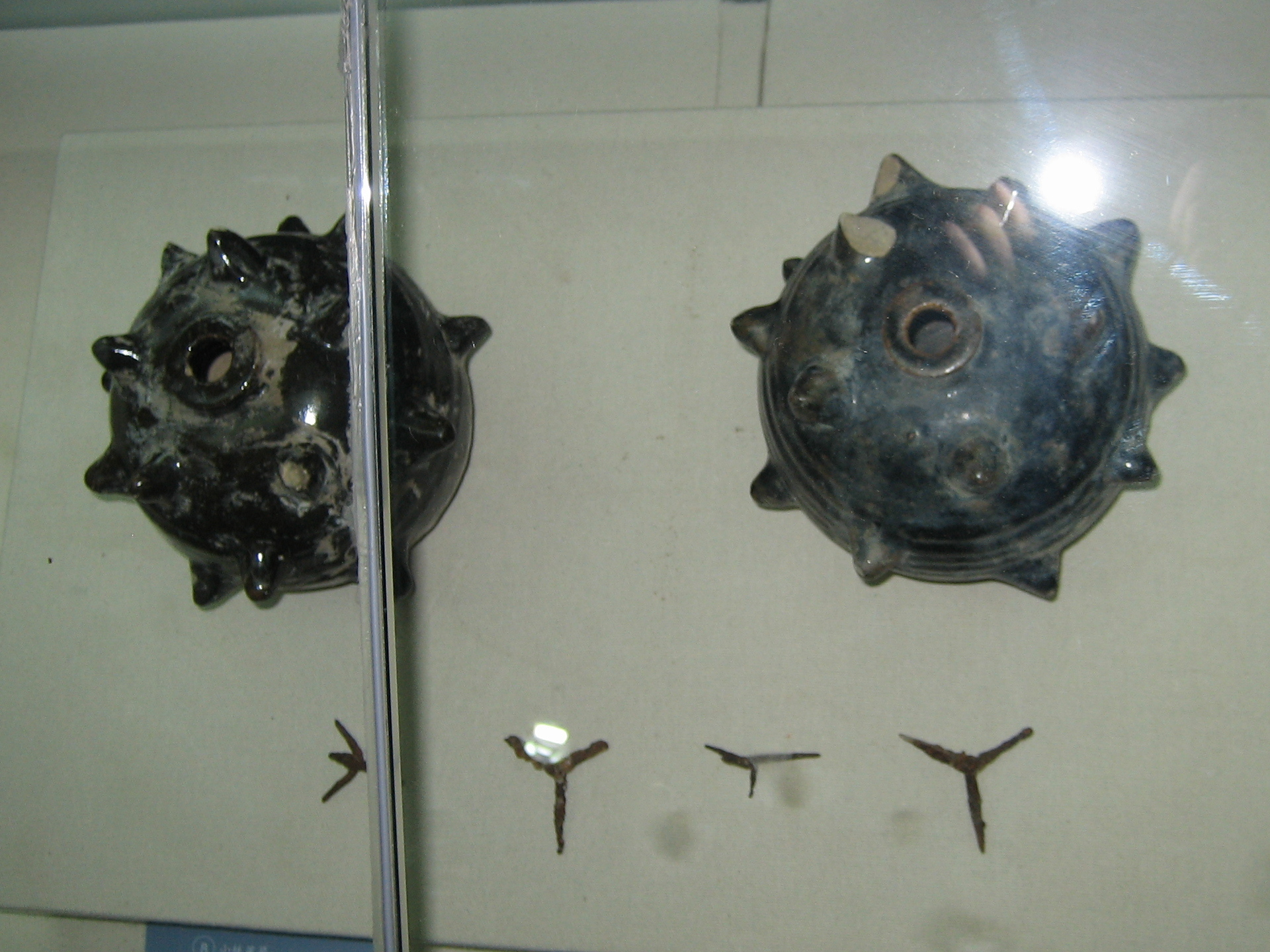
Traditional caltrops and mines from the Mongol Empire

== Modern uses ==
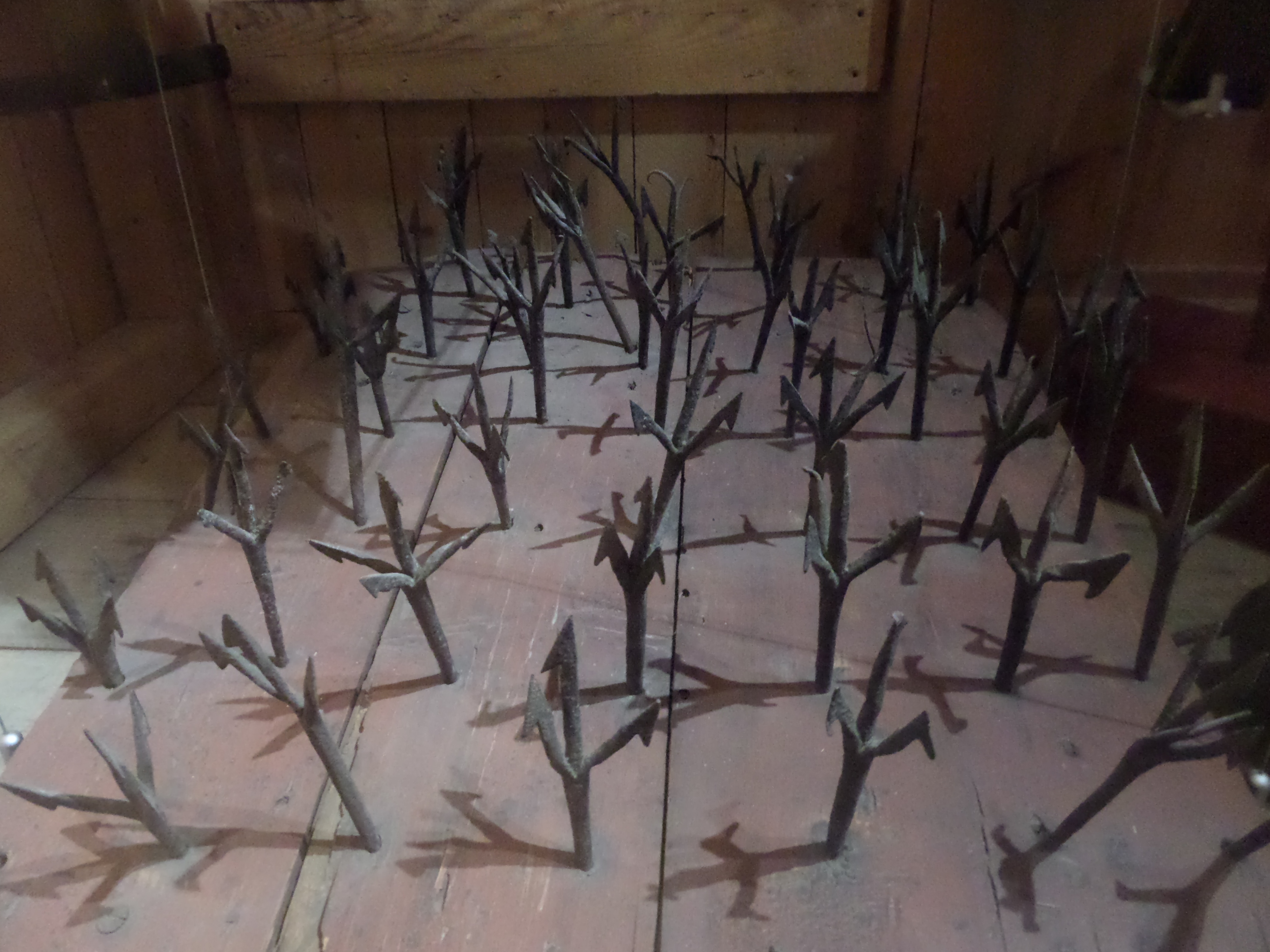
Crow's feet boards studded with spikes. These were laid on the ground to prevent the enemy from approaching the defences. This board was used by the Russian Army during the Battle of Balaclava. On display at Royal Engineers Museum, Kent.

=== World War I ===
During service in World War I, Australian Light Horse troops collected caltrops as keepsakes. These caltrops were either made by welding two pieces of wire together to form a four-pointed star or pouring molten steel into a mould to form a solid, seven-pointed star. The purpose of these devices was to disable horses. They were exchanged with French troops for bullets. The Australian Light Horse troops referred to them as "Horse Chestnuts".

=== World War II ===
Caltrops were used extensively and effectively during World War II. The modifications and variants produced by the Special Operations Executive (SOE) and the Office of Strategic Services (OSS) of the United States are still in use today within special forces and law enforcement bodies.

The Germans dropped "crows' feet" (German: Krähenfüße). These were made from two segments of sheet metal welded together into a tetrapod with four barbed points and then painted in camouflage colours. They came in two sizes with a side length of either 65 or 75 millimetres (2.6 or 3.0 in). They were dropped from aircraft in containers the same size as 500 kg (1,100 lb) bombs and were dispersed by a small explosive charge.

=== Tire deflation device ===
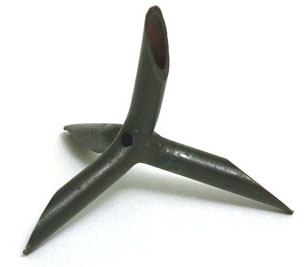
Caltrop used by the US Office of Strategic Services. The hollow spikes puncture self-sealing rubber tyres. The hole in the centre allows air to escape even if other ends of the tube are sealed by soft ground.

Inventors patented caltrop-like devices to deflate vehicle tyres in a manner useful to law enforcement agencies or the military. They are currently used by the military and police.

=== Labour disputes ===
Caltrops have been used at times during labour strikes and other disputes. Such devices were used by some to destroy the tires of management and replacement workers.

Caltrops, referred to as "jack rocks" in news articles, were used during the Caterpillar strike in 1995, puncturing tires on vehicles crossing the picket line in Peoria, Illinois. Because of their small size and the difficulty proving their source, both the company and the United Auto Workers blamed each other. Collateral damage included a school bus and a walking mail carrier. In Illinois, the state legislature passed a law making the possession of such devices a misdemeanor.

=== Via drones ===
During the Russian invasion of Ukraine, Ukraine has used drones to drop caltrops on key roads to disrupt wheeled vehicles carrying Russian military materiel, and make them easier to target with loitering munitions.

== Symbol ==
A caltrop has a variety of symbolic uses and is commonly found as a charge in heraldry. For instance, the Finnish noble family Fotangel (Swedish for 'caltrop') had arms gules, three caltrops argent.

It has also been adopted by military units: the caltrop is the symbol of the US Army's III Corps, which is based at Fort Hood, Texas. III Corps traces its lineage to the days of horse cavalry, which used the caltrop as a defensive area denial weapon.

The caltrop is also the symbol of the United States Marine Corps' 3rd Division, formed on 16 September 1942.

Coat of arms of Stirling

Shoulder insignia of III Corps (United States)

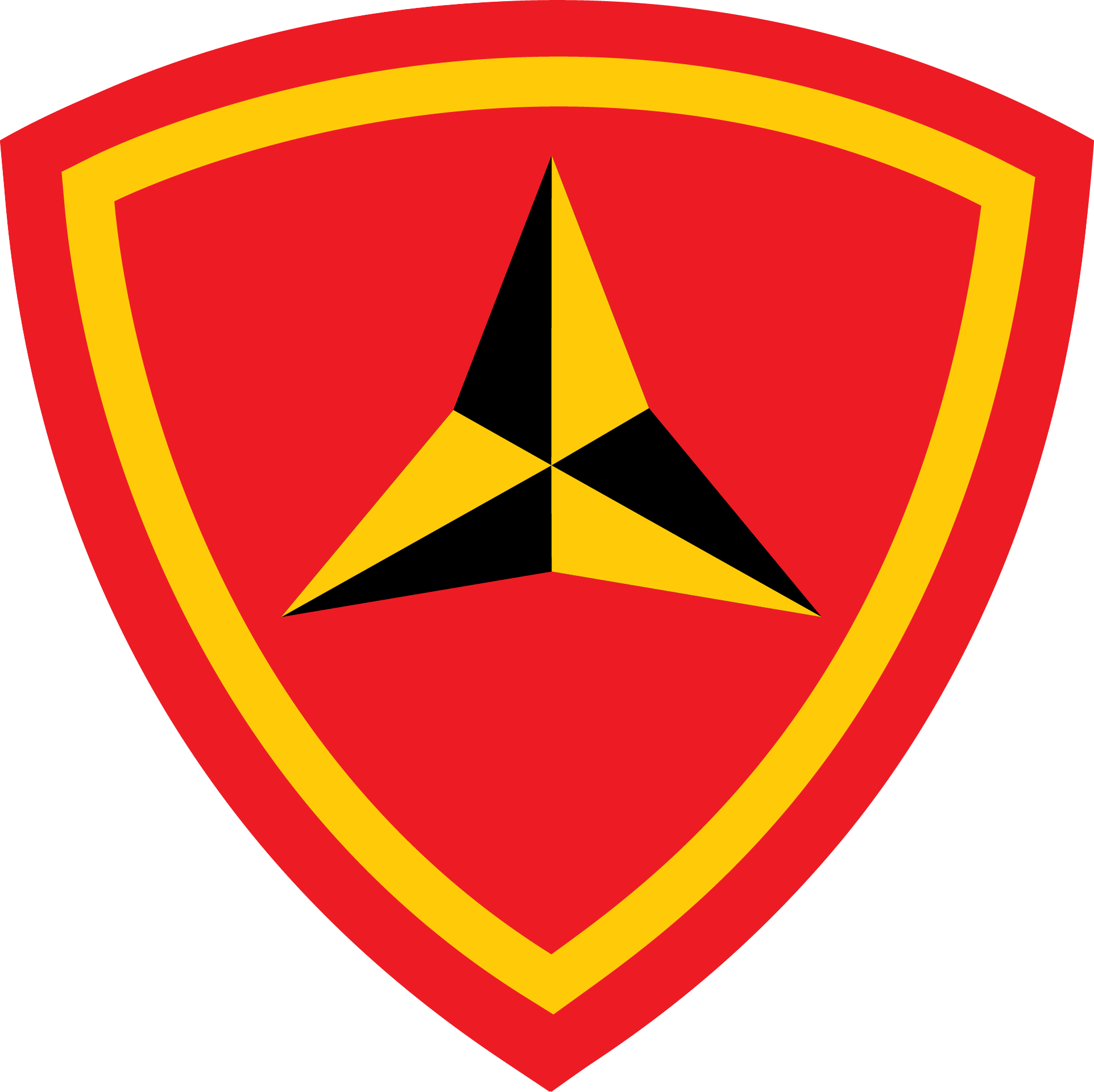
3rd Marine Division (United States)

== Similar devices ==
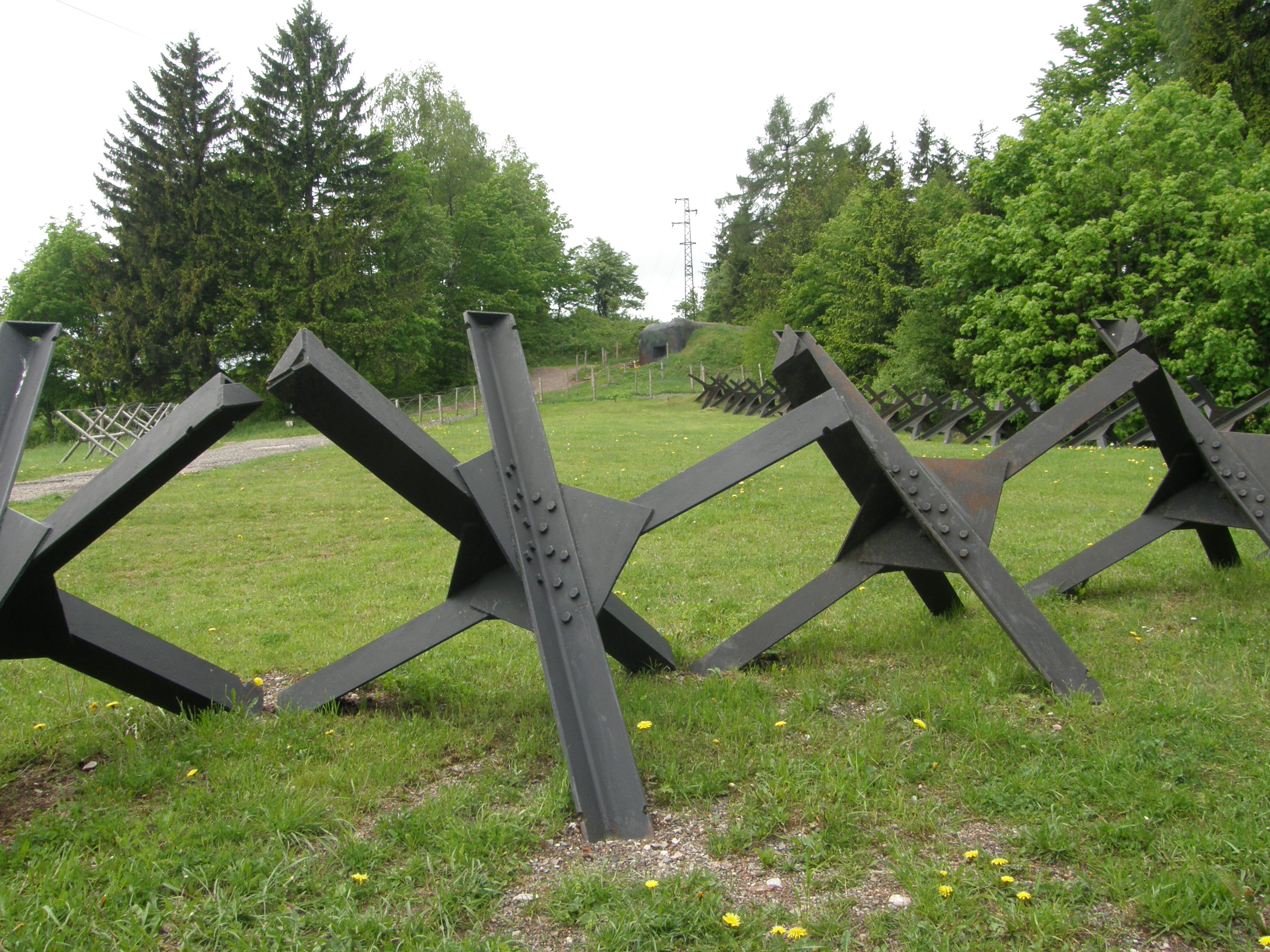
Czech hedgehogs deployed at the Stachelberg fortress in Czechoslovakia in 1938

Punji sticks perform a similar role to caltrops. These are sharpened sticks placed vertically in the ground. Their use in modern times targets the body and limbs of a falling victim by means of a pit or tripwire.

During the Second World War, large caltrop-shaped objects made from reinforced concrete were used as anti-tank devices, although it seems that these were rare. Much more common were concrete devices called dragon's teeth, which were designed to wedge into tank treads. Large ones weighing over 1 tonne (1.1 tons) are still used defensively to deny access to wheeled vehicles, especially in camp areas. Because dragon's teeth are immobile, the analogy with the caltrop is inexact. Another caltrop-like defence during World War II was the massive steel, freestanding Czech hedgehog; the works were designed as anti-tank obstacles and could also damage landing craft and warships that came too close to shore. These were used by the Germans to defend beaches in Normandy and other coastal areas. Czech hedgehogs are heavily featured and plainly visible in the 1998 Steven Spielberg-directed American epic war film Saving Private Ryan, throughout the scenes early in the film depicting the June 6, 1944 Omaha Beach assault (part of the Normandy landings during World War II).

Tetrapods are concrete blocks shaped like caltrops, which interlock when piled up. They are used as riprap in the construction of breakwaters and other sea defences, as they have been found to let the water pass through them and interrupt natural processes less than some other defences.

== See also ==
- Punji stick
- Booby trap
- Knucklebones, a game, with similar hazards
- Triskelion
- D4, a four-sided die commonly used in roleplaying games
