= LO vz. 37 =

Type of Czechoslovak fortification

Bunker 195 in the 62 Sector with a 140 degree firing angle.

The LO vz. 37 Bunker, also called the Řopík, is a Czechoslovak type of fortification constructed between 1935 and 1938. The type of bunker is not to be confused with the Czech machine gun called the ZB vz. 37. The bunker is the most common type of Czechoslovak bunker, with around 8,200 built in what is now the Czech Republic and around 1,800 built in what is now Slovakia. The total deployment in the former territories of Czechoslovakia was around 9,600 bunkers. Many of the bunkers were abandoned having seen no combat, but some have been turned into museums or lodging.

== Description ==
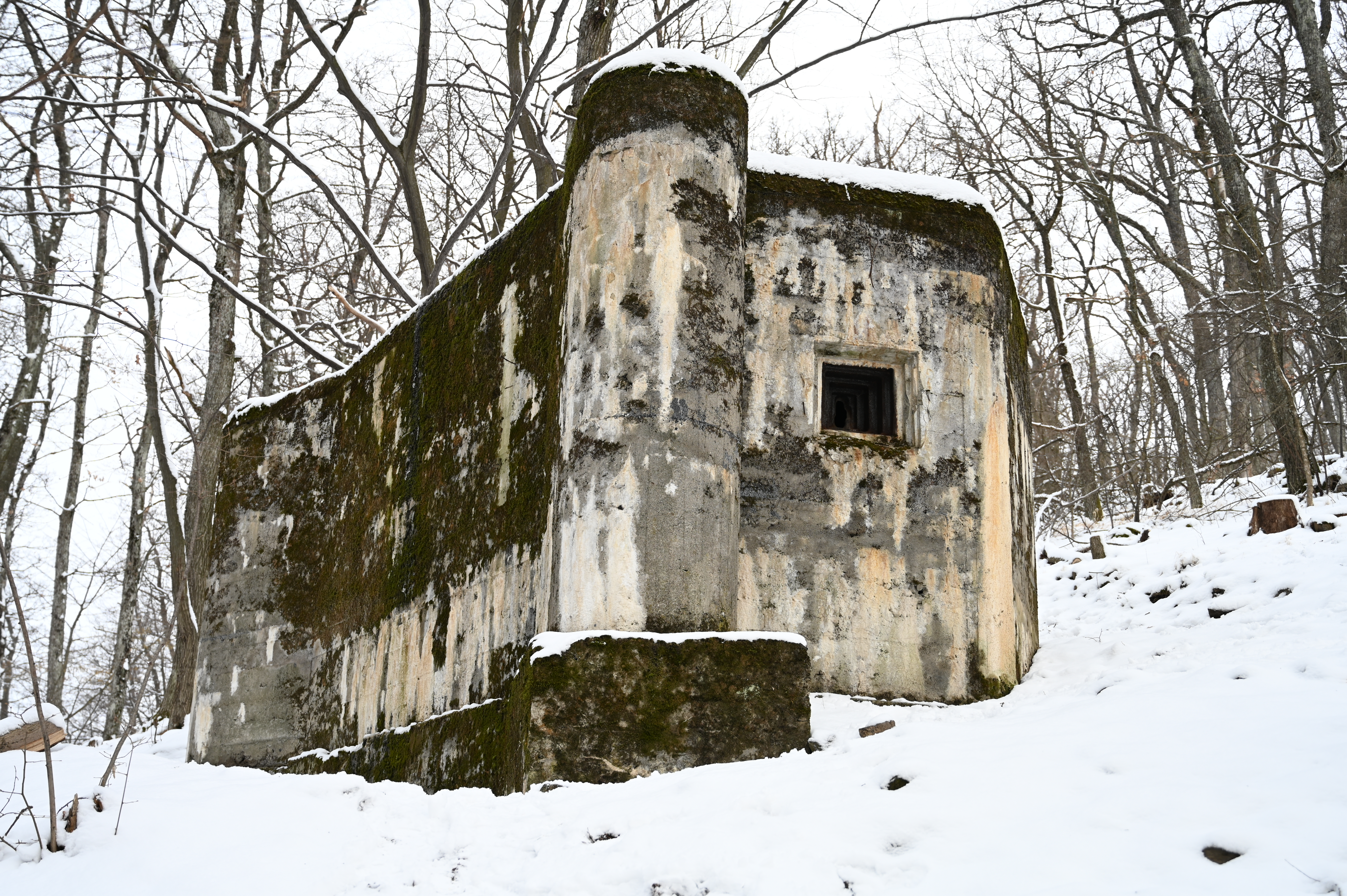
A Type A LO vz. 37 bunker in Eastern Slovakia. The large wall shown is the "back wall", which was usually placed into a hillside.

The LO vz. 37 is the shorter name for the Lehký objekt vzor 37, also known as the Řopík. The bunker gets its name, Řopík, from the military unit who oversaw the construction the bunkers, ŘOP, or the Directorate of Fortification Work. The full name translates to light object M. 37, for the year it was designed, 1937. The vz. 37 is one of the most widely deployed uniform fortifications in history, as well as in the Czech Republic. If you encounter an armed bunker in a Czech forest, there is a 95% chance that it is a LO vz. 37. The bunker type was closely modeled on French designs, as was most of Czechoslovakia's defenses. The Czechs made their own version of the Maginot Line, only on a smaller scale and built years quicker.

== Reasons for design and construction ==
When the President of Germany, Paul von Hindenburg died in early August 1934, Hitler decided to try and pass an emergency powers act that would give him full control for 4 years. This disturbed the Czechs, and 19 days after Hindenburg's death they decided to build extensive border fortifications against some of Poland and Hungary's borders, and fortify all of the German border. On March 20, 1935, the ROP was created, with Gen. Karel Husarek in command. They proceed to design the vz. 36, the precursor to the vz. 37, however the bunker was not widely deployed and was rather weak. When the vz. 36 was tested by Czech engineers, they realized that it was weak, and that they needed to create a stronger bunker with the same purpose. The vz. 36 also had a critical flaw, it was meant for frontal fire, exposing it to direct artillery. They drew up plans for the vz. 37, tested it, and realized that they had found a bunker that could withstand both tank guns and artillery. Unlike the vz. 36, the vz. 37 was a flanking fire bunker, meaning it did not fire head on at the enemy, rather at their sides. In the next 15 months, 9,600 vz. 37 bunkers were built along border areas.

== Characteristics ==
A cast steel machine gun embrasure, one of a few that remain in their original housings. the writing on the wall reads: "Military Facility, deadly danger".

The LO vz. 37 measures 7 (L) x 5 (W) x 3m (H), and is made of reinforced concrete. Most of the bunkers were built into hills or slopes, so that only the firing embrasures protruded above the surface. Inside the bunkers are 2 rooms for the machine guns, and 1 room for the crew. Observation was done using a periscope, and to dislodge any infantry on top of or in the blind spots of the MGs was a grenade shoot for dropping grenades. Each bunker was armed with 2 ZB vz. 37 heavy machine guns in embrasures, and when you look at the bunker from the entrance, the guns fire left and right. The bunkers were constructed in pairs, so that 2 machine guns could control an area. The bunker was constructed with varying wall thicknesses depending on where they were built. The bunkers with the weakest walls were usually in places farther from the border. Bunkers with medium thickness walls were constructed the most commonly and were emplaced in wooded terrain, which is very common in Northern Czech Republic, and to a certain extent, Slovakia. Bunkers with the thickest walls were placed in places where terrain could not hide the bunkers, such as on mountains or on plains.

The bunkers were built in 24 to 36 hours, and were made using continuous pours, meaning that the concrete would chemically bond together and make the overall structure stronger. The walls were reinforced with steel mesh as well as 12mm or 20mm thick rebar, which boosted the durability of the walls. The entrance door, called a Type N, was made of cast steel with a thickness of anywhere between 3 and 5cm. On the inside of the bunker, there was cast steel armor which hung on the walls to prevent a bullet or shell from going through either the shooting room wall or the entrance corridor into the other. The periscope, which was mounted on every type of vz. 37 bunker, was made out of cast steel to make it more durable under fire. In each firing room there was a cast steel chimney for wicking away the carbon monoxide fumes from the machine guns, which if not dealt with, could kill the crew. Depending on the bunker, the chimney was operated by hand or by electricity. Each of the firing rooms for the machine guns in the conventional Type A vz. 37 bunker was 6 m2, whereas the smallest of any type vz. 37 bunker was 4 m2.

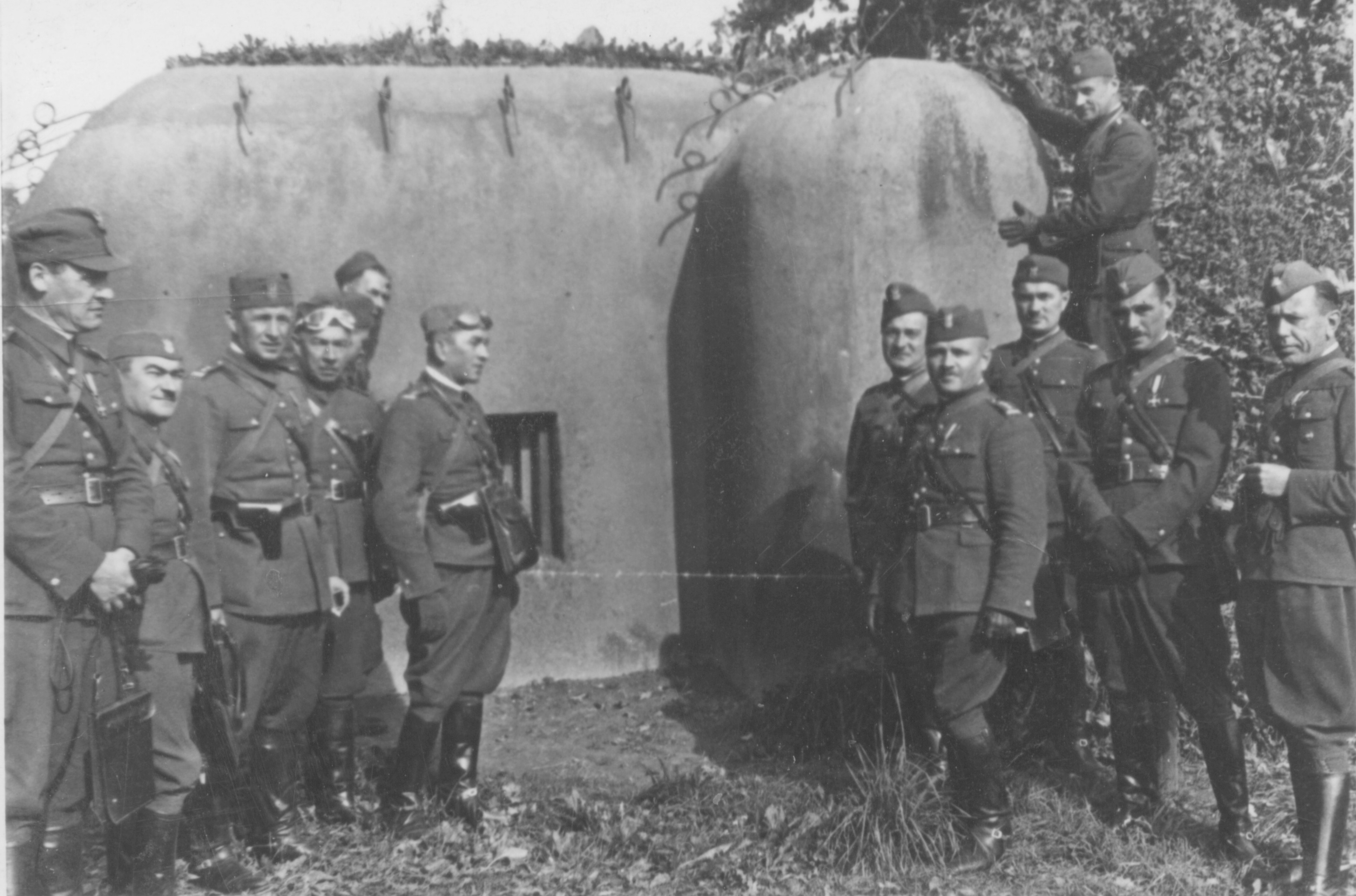
A group of high-ranking officers gather around a newly-made LO vz. 37.

Depending on the crew of each type of bunker, the bunker would be equipped with beds for half the amount of crew members, so while half the crew slept, the other half were on watch. Each bunker was equipped with 8,000 rounds for each machine gun, stored in wooden crates. The bunkers had dry toilets, meaning that chemicals dissolved the waste rather than water flushing it away. Each bunker was equipped with 60 liters of water and enough food for 5-7 days. Overall, the bunkers were not meant to be garrisoned for long periods of time, since ventilation was poor, as well as supplies and hygiene. In some bunkers when the machine gun in the armored dome was firing, the noise level reached 120 decibels. The average construction time was 6-8 weeks, but after the Anschluss in May 1938, the construction time was reduced to 4 weeks. The average cost of a vz. 37 bunker was anywhere between 130,000 and 150,000 CZK (Czechoslovak koruna).

In the colder border areas, all types of bunker were equipped with the necessary facilities to make life more comfortable. Some of the features included a double door for insulation, a wood or coal stove, metal panes for closing the firing embrasure, frost resistant foods, and heated water. A curtain was placed over the light to dim the light escaping so that it did not give away the bunker's position. The periscope was also tinted for nighttime use.

== Different types of LO vz. 37 bunkers ==
a Czechoslovak soldier posing next to a Type A bunker. The earth on the left side of the photo was common with Type A bunkers since they had to frontal-firing machine guns.

The rear of a Type B bunker, which is part of a museum now

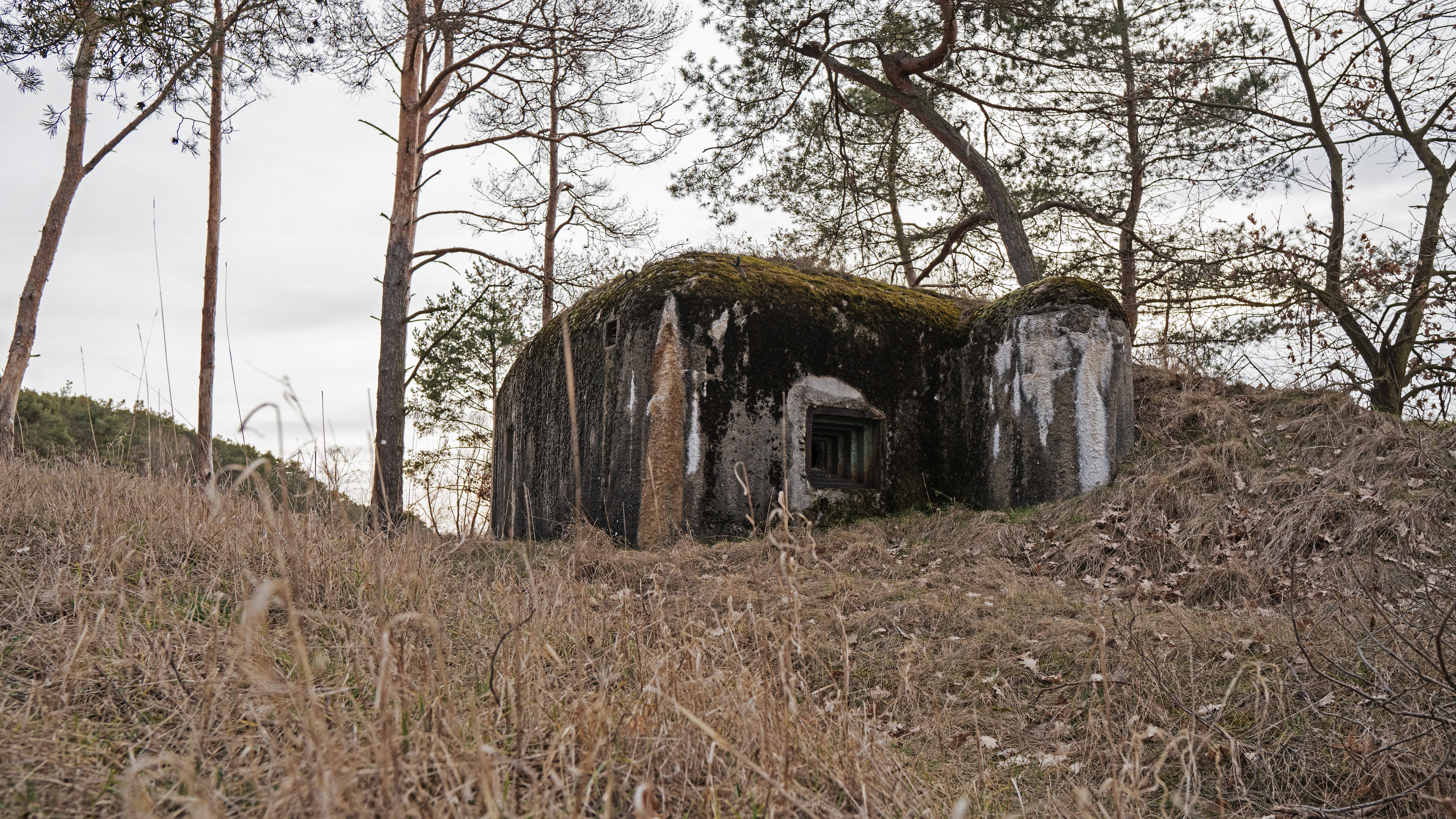
A Type D bunker in Gajary, Slovakia. The embrasure shown is for a 37mm anti-tank gun.

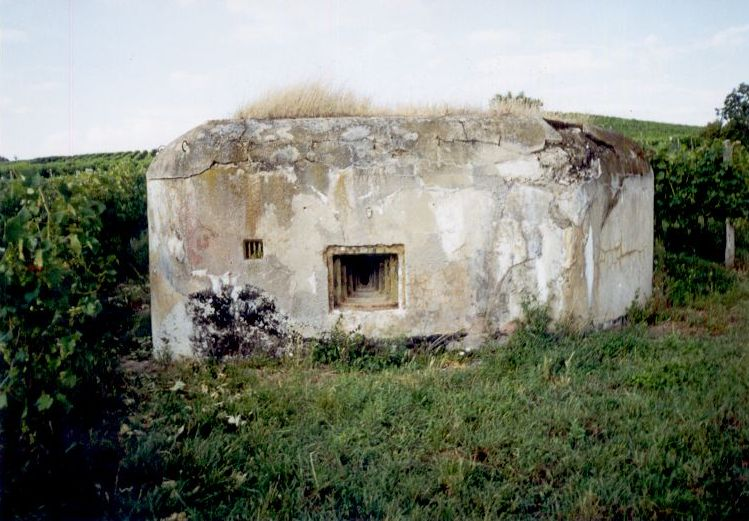
A Type E1 Bunker in the Břeclav region

A barred of entrance to a Type H bunker

There were 5 different types of vz. 37 bunkers, designated A though E.

Type A: Type A bunkers were the most widely deployed bunkers out of all 5 different types at nearly 85%. It has 2 side embrasures, which mounted heavy machine guns in cast steel embrasures. Each of the firing rooms faces the opposite of the other, usually left-right. The bunker was crewed by 7 men, 1 commander, 2 gunners, 2 reloaders, 1 periscope operator, and 1 radio/signalman. The Type A has several sub-types based on the firing radius degrees. The sub-types are: A-120, A-140, A-160, A-180, A-200, and A-220.

Type B: Type B bunkers were minorly deployed, and only had 1 machine gun. 1 wall faces the expected line of attack by the enemy, while one of the sides contains the cast steel embrasure. The other 2 walls were usually covered by earth or built directly into hills or stone. The side that contained the gun embrasure depended on the sub-type. Sub-type B1's machine gun embrasure was on the left, while sub-type B2's embrasure was on the right.The bunkers were crewed by 7 men, doing the exact same jobs as in a Type A.

Type C: Type C bunkers were rarely deployed, and were meant for frontal fire. The only wall exposed was the frontal wall, where the machine gun embrasure was. The bunker was designed to be placed in areas where it complemented other bunkers, such as a few hundred meters behind the main line where it could fire on the rears of the frontal bunkers. The use of a frontal embrasure represents a step back from the lessons learned from the vz. 36, and were thus employed in very few areas. The bunker was crewed by 4 men, 1 commander, 1 gunner, 1 reloader, and 1 spotter.

Type D: Type D bunkers represents one of the smallest minority of all types of LO vz. 37 bunker built at only 4.6% of all vz. 37 bunkers. The bunker is only found near large artillery forts and is only used to protect the entrances to the artillery forts. The bunker was crewed by 4 men doing the exact same jobs as Type C bunkers.

Type E: The Type E is the rarest of all types of LO vz. 37 bunkers at only 2.9% of vz. 37 bunkers built. The bunker was designed to be small and low to the ground. The bunker was designed for areas with low camouflage. The bunker was also designed for small heights where the machine gun would need to go lower. The bunker was crewed by 2 men, 1 gunner and 1 spotter.

Type F: Type F bunkers were built to house a 37mm anti-tank gun and its ammo. The first design for the bunker type was drawn up in May 1937, and began being built during the same time as the Type A. The gun the bunkers mounted was either a vz. 34 or a vz. 37. The gun had a 60 degree traverse within its embrasure. Unlike all other types of the vz. 37, the Type F was not equipped with ventilation or a periscope. The ROP realized this, and only 1 type of this bunker was ever built. Although the entrance was protected from direct fire by a corner, the door was only made of mesh.

Type G: The Type G bunkers were the exact same design as the Type F, but was produced later. Only one of this type exists, and it has been heavily damaged by combat and bricked off. The bunker is in the Orava Region.

Type H: Type H bunkers were built to store a 37mm anti-tank gun and its related supplies. The bunker design was drafted in July 1938, and the bunker is divided into 3 rooms. The largest room stored the gun, the medium sized room was for housing the gun crew, and the smallest room was for the anti-tank gun's ammo. The height of the bunker was only 140cm (4ft 7in), so working and living inside would have been cramped. The area around the bunker would have contained a field position for the AT gun, as well as supporting trenches. Only one of this type was built, near Bratislava. While the bunker is in good shape, it is very remote and hard to reach.

== Regional deployal ==
Overall, 9,632 LO vz. 37 bunkers were built all across Czechoslovakia, out of 15,463 planned. The only interruption in construction was when Hitler took the Sudetenland in Sept. 1938, which is where most of the bunkers were located, as well as many raw materials and heavy industries. 5 to 7 bunkers were deployed per km. This could vary in some sectors due to terrain or natural obstacles inhibiting the construction of bunkers. The bunkers were mainly built in the northern regions, such as northern Moravia, Northern Bohemia, and southern Silesia. Despite the large deployments in the north, they were also constructed in what is now Slovakia, such as along the Danube near Bratislava. The less heavily reinforced bunkers were constructed in inland defensive lines such as the Brno and Prague Lines.

Northern Border Regions: Constructed mainly in the mountains to guard passes

Northern Moravia and Silesia: Mainly constructed to guard the large artillery forts

Southern Moravia and Slovakia: Constructed after the Anschluss in March 1938 near Bratislava. Also constructed on the border with Hungary, which had claimed the area.

Inland: Mainly built in the Prague and Brno Lines, which were constructed as secondary defenses around their respective cities.

== 1937 to March 1939 ==
The LO vz. 37 design was first drafted in 1937, and was tested and implemented the same year. The bunkers were garrisoned every month as a precaution and for training. After the Anschluss in March 1938, new bunkers being constructed along the border with Austria were given an elevated status for building due to the German occupation. The bunkers were partially mobilized when info gained from the Soviet Union said that Germany planned to invade the country. It was later found out that this info was false and was sent to try and trigger a war in Western Europe.

On Sept. 21, Czechoslovakia agreed to give Sudetenland to the Germans, but at the same time ordered the full occupation of the bunkers by border troops. On Sept. 23, a new cabinet ordered full mobilization, and all bunkers, artillery forts, and other types of border fortifications were garrisoned by regular troops from the Czechoslovak army. On Sept. 29, Britain, France, Italy, and Germany all signed an agreement in Munich, called the Munich Agreement, which removed the Sudetenland from Czechoslovakia. No Czechoslovak was in attendance and thus no opposition was voiced.

The Czechoslovak army was ordered to abandon all bunkers in the Sudetenland within 10 days without damaging them. Most of the Czechoslovak defenses were concentrated in this area, so most of the 9,600 vz. 37 bunkers fell within German control. Only a small amount remained in Czechoslovakia, mainly near Bratislava and in the Prague and Brno Lines. By March 1939, every single vz. 37 bunker existed outside of Czechoslovakia's borders, with a majority in Germany, but some were in Hungary, Poland, which gained some Czechoslovak lands after the First Vienna Award. Germany occupied the rest of Czechoslovakia in March 1939, carving it up into German protectorates or puppet states. German authorities feared that local resistance groups would use the bunkers for operations, so many were intentionally destroyed.

== April 1939 to May 1945 ==
A damaged bunker from German tests

Soon after German troops occupied the Sudetenland, German engineers began testing Czechoslovak bunkers with tanks, artillery and infantry weapons. They soon found out that Czech concrete was very durable, and later used the recipe for constructing their Atlantikwall fortifications. The findings from these tests were used to neutralize fortification in France and the “Low Countries” in May 1940. A comprehensive study was done in 1941 to study the design, weakness and possible anti-fortification weapons. Between 1939 and 1942, many German officials who occupied Czechoslovakia worried that the bunker would be used for resistance activity, much the same way they had thought in March 1939. They decided the best way to prevent this was to destroy many of the bunkers around Prague. Summarily, many were destroyed. When Hitler ordered the construction of the Atlantic Wall in 1942, German engineers took the cast iron pieces from Czechoslovak bunkers to be used in German bunkers.

== June 1945 to today ==
After World War II, Czechoslovakia was under heavy Soviet influence and became a Communist country. At first, the bunkers were dismantled and scrapped, but in 1948 this practice stopped in favor of using the bunkers again. In the 1950s and 1960s, there was a fear of a NATO invasion, so the bunkers were pressed into use. Many operated as small warehouses, but some were equipped for combat operations. In the 1970s and ‘80s, the bunkers started to be abandoned in favor of newer, more protected bunkers. Some still garrisoned troops or stored supplies, much like the large artillery forts constructed around the same time. In 1989, the communist government in Czechoslovakia bloodlessly fell in what was called the “Velvet Revolution”. All of the bunkers were abandoned by the authorities.

A LO vz. 37 Type A bunker in Karlštejn, Czech Republic. Today it is a museum of fortifications.

When the Czech Republic and Slovakia separated in 1992, most of the bunkers ended up in the Czech Republic. The main concentration of bunkers in Slovakia are along the Hungarian border, some near the Polish border, and around Bratislava, their capital. Since the 1990s, many bunkers have been restored, some as museums, others as monuments. Since 2020, a Czech-Danish architectural firm has been turning bunkers into cabins and other buildings, such as saunas, wine cellars, and viewpoints. Many of the bunkers still remain, nearly 6,000 out of the original 9,600 built.

== See also ==
- Czechoslovak border fortifications
