= Czechoslovak border fortifications =

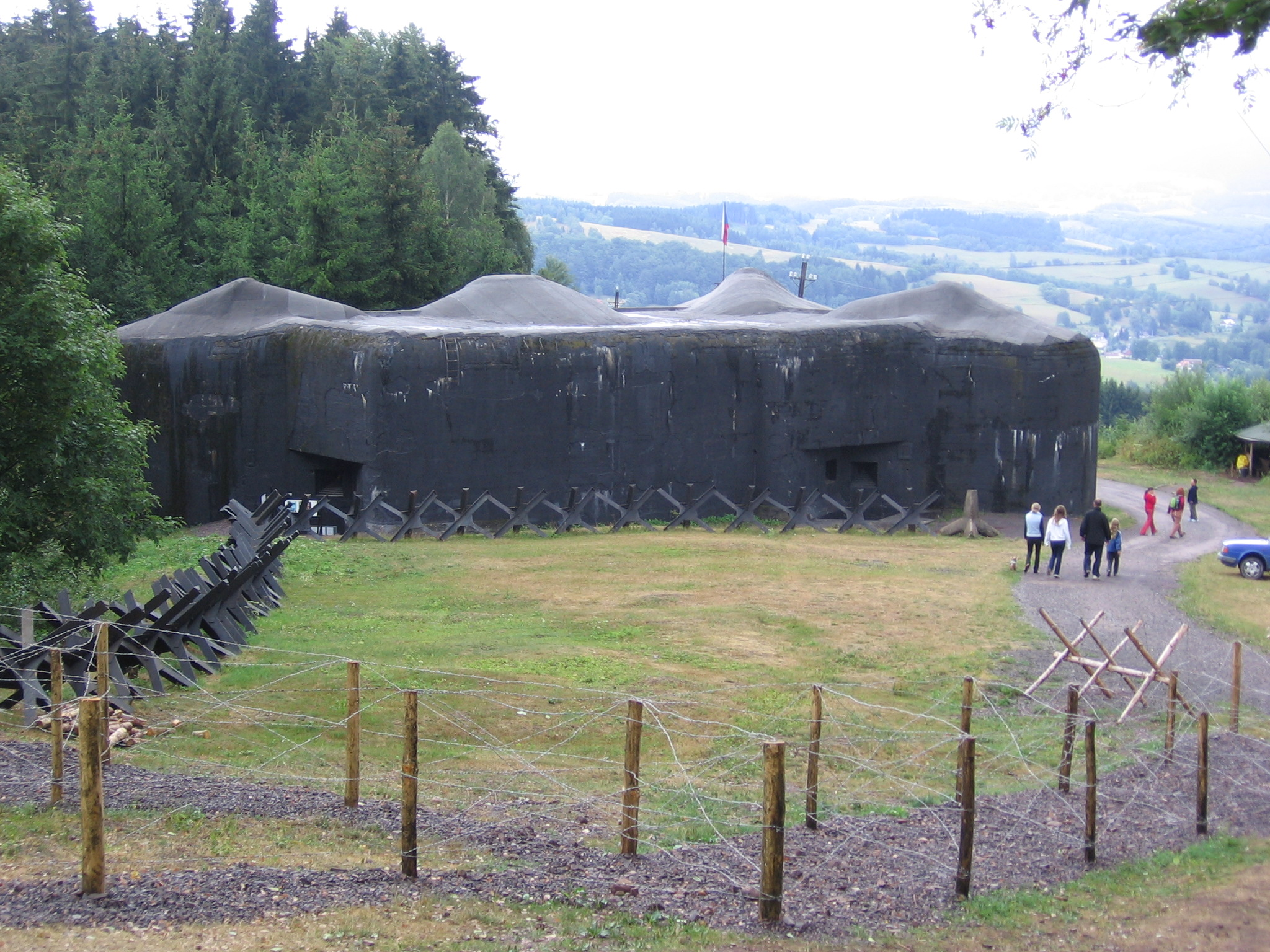
T-S 73 Polom

Czechoslovakia built a system of border fortifications as well as some fortified defensive lines inland, from 1935 to 1938 as a defensive countermeasure against the rising threat of Nazi Germany. The objective of the fortifications was to prevent the taking of key areas by an enemy—not only Germany but also Hungary and Poland—by means of a sudden attack before the mobilization of the Czechoslovak Army could be completed, and to enable effective defense until allies—Britain and France, and possibly the Soviet Union—could help.

== History ==
With the rise of Hitler and his demands for unification of German minorities, including the Sudeten Germans, and the return of other claimed territories—Sudetenland—the alarmed Czechoslovak leadership began defensive plans. While some basic defensive structures were built early on, it was not until after conferences with the French military on their design that a full-scale effort began.

A change in the design philosophy was noticeable in the "pillboxes" and larger blockhouses similar to the French Maginot Line when the massive construction program began in 1936. The original plan was to have the first stage of construction finished in 1941–1942, whilst the full system should have been completed by the early 1950s.

Construction was very rapid, and by the time of the Munich Agreement in September 1938, there were completed in total 264 heavy blockhouses (small forts or elements of strongholds) and 10,014 light pillboxes, which means about 20 percent of the heavy objects and 70 percent of the light objects. Moreover, many other objects were near completion and would have been functional at least as shelters despite missing certain heavy armaments in some structures.

After the German occupation of Czechoslovakia border regions as a result of the Sudeten Crisis, the Germans used these objects to test and develop new weapons and tactics, plan, and practice the attacks eventually used against the Maginot Line and Belgium's forts, resulting in astounding success. After the fall of France and the Low Countries, the Germans began to dismantle the "Beneš Wall", blowing up the cupolas, or removing them and the embrasures, some of which were eventually installed in the Atlantic Wall.

Later in the war, with the Soviet forces to the east collapsing the German front, the Germans hurriedly repaired what they could of the fortifications, often just bricking up the holes where the embrasures once were, leaving a small hole for a machine gun. The east–west portion of the line that ran from Ostrava to Opava, a river valley with a steep rise to the south, became the scene of heavy fighting.

During World War II the Germans had removed many armored parts like domes, cupolas and embrasures from the majority of the objects. Some objects became subjects of German penetration shells or explosives testing and are heavily damaged. In the post-war period, many of the remaining armoured parts were scrapped as a result of a loss of their strategic value and general drive for steel.

After the war they were further stripped of useful materials and then sealed. A couple of the large underground structures continued to be used long after as military hardware storage, and some still are to this day, by the once again independent Czech Army.

== Design ==
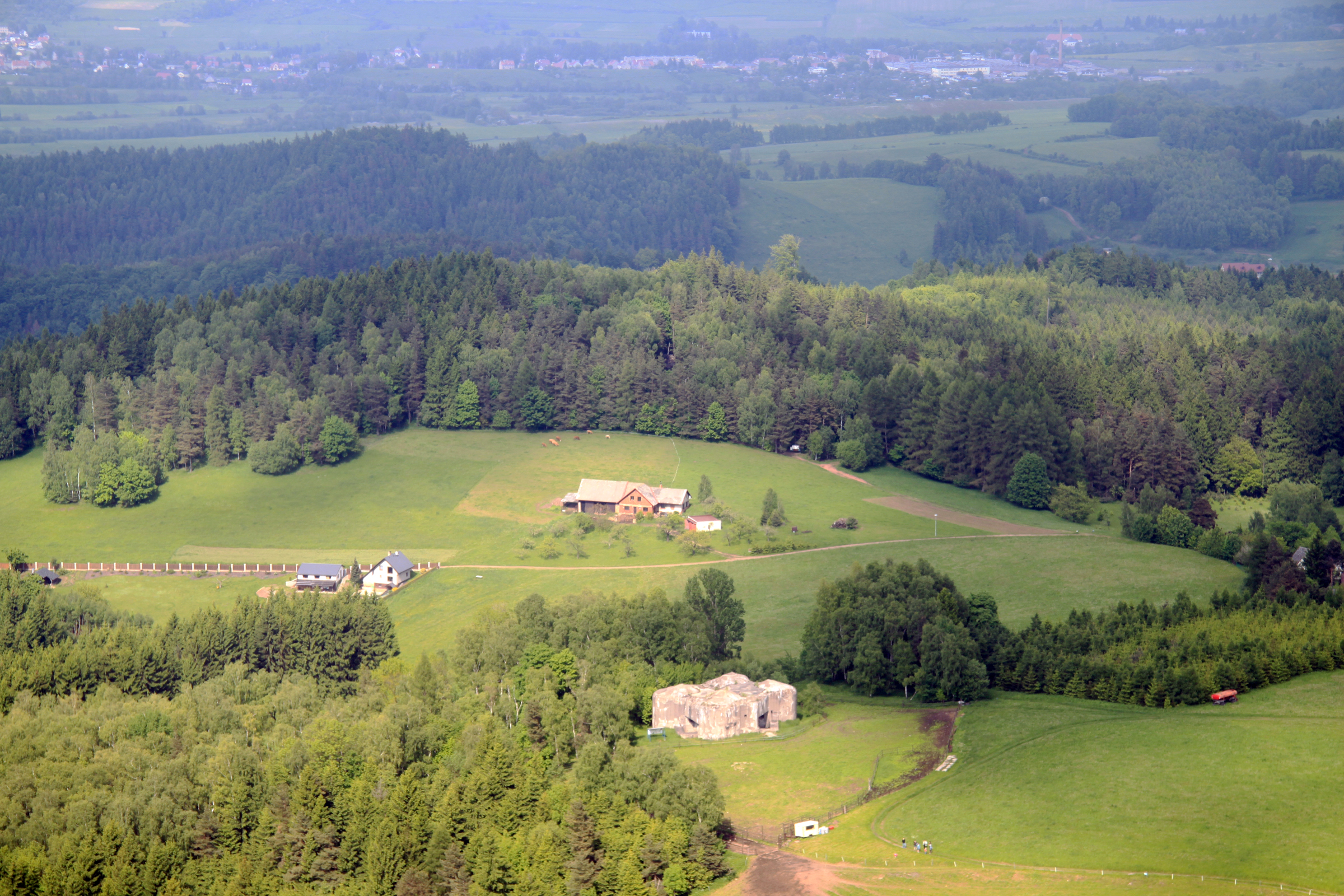
N-D-S 73 Jeřáb, part of fortress Dobrošov near Náchod

The basic philosophy of the design was a mutual defensive line, that is, most of the firepower was directed laterally from the approaching enemy. The facing wall of all the fortifications, large and small, was the thickest, covered with boulders and debris, and covered again with soil so even the largest caliber shells would have lost most of their energy before reaching the concrete. The only frontal armament was machine gun ports in cupolas designed for observation and anti-infantry purposes. Any enemy units that tried to go between the blockhouses would have been stopped by anti-tank, anti-infantry barricades, machine gun and cannon fire. A few of the larger blockhouses, or artillery forts, had indirect fire mortars and heavy cannon mounts. Behind the major structures were two rows of smaller four-to-seven-man pillboxes called LO vz. 37 that mirrored their larger relatives, with a well protected front and lateral cross fire to stop any enemy that managed to get on top of the fort, or come up from behind. Most of the lines consisted of just the smaller pillboxes.

The "light objects" were simple hollow boxes with one or two machine gun positions, a retractable observation periscope, grenade tubes, a hand-operated air blower, and a solid inner door at 90 degrees to a steel bar outer door. The machine gun was mounted near the end of the barrel, so that the port hole was only large enough for the bullets and a scope to see through, unlike most other designs where a large opening is used. A heavy steel plate could be slid down to quickly close the tiny hole for added protection.

The "heavy objects" were infantry blockhouses very similar to the southern part of the Maginot Line, but with substantial improvements. Just like the pillboxes, the cannons and machine guns were pivoted at the tip, and this time fully enclosed, protecting the occupants from all but the heaviest of cannons. The fortresses had a full ventilation system with filtration so even chemical attacks would not affect the defenders. Besides grid power, a two-cylinder diesel engine provided internal power. These fortifications also had full toilet and wash basin amenities, a luxury compared to its French counterpart casemates – however, these facilities were designed to be used only during the combat. While largely hollow with a few concrete walls as part of the structure, each chamber was further divided into smaller rooms by simple brick and mortar walls, with a last gap at the ceiling filled with tarred cork, since construction of a few of the casemates stopped before the internal walls were finished.

== Current state ==
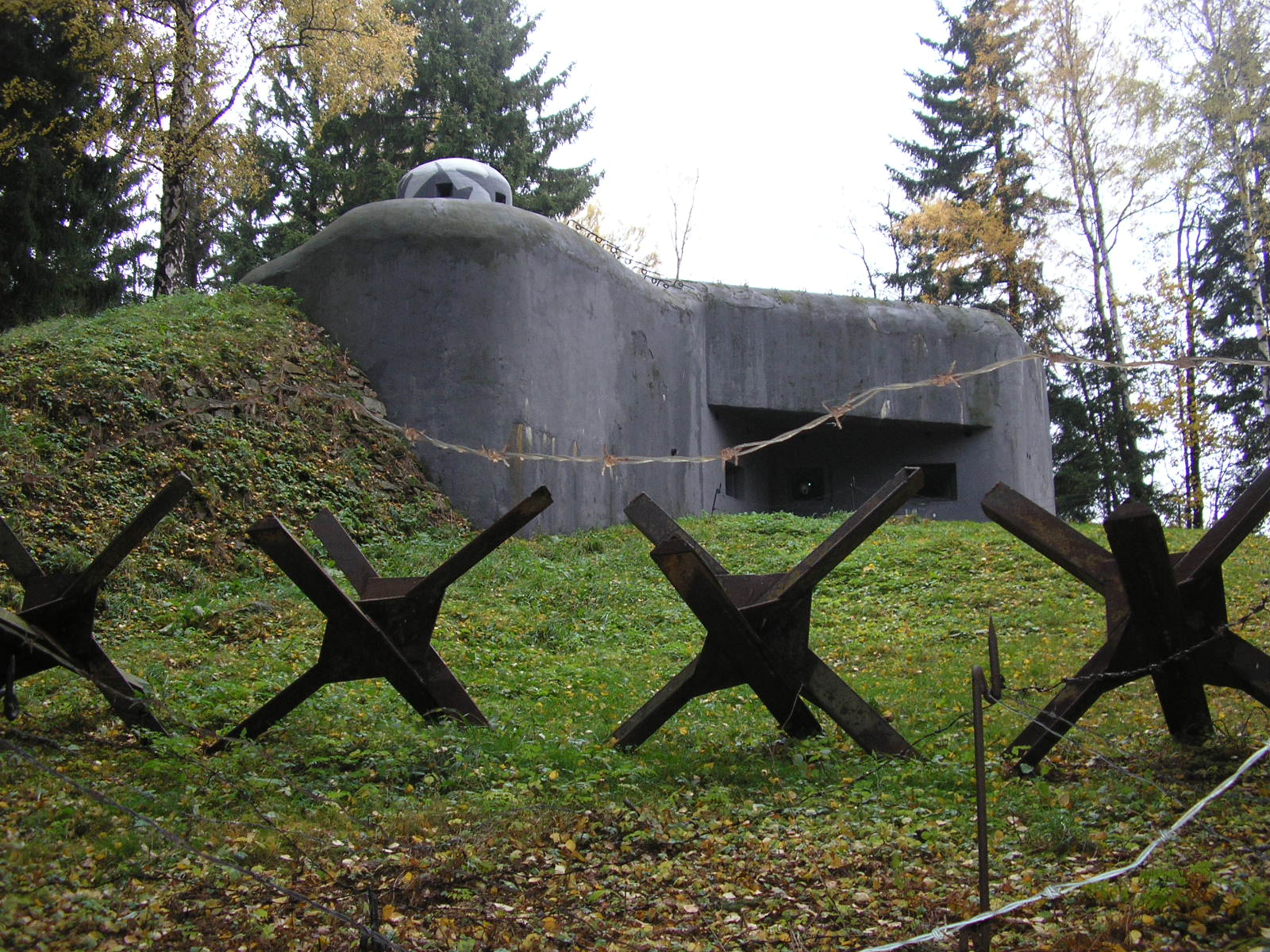
K-S 5 U potoka

Today almost all of the remaining light objects are freely accessible. Some of the heavy objects are also accessible, others may be rented or sold to enthusiasts. A certain number were turned into museums and two of the artillery fortifications, namely "Adam" and "Smolkov" are military munitions depot, with Artillery Fort Hůrka being a munitions depot until 2008, it is now a museum. The "Hanička" Artillery Fort was being rebuilt into a modern shelter for the Ministry of Interior between 1979 and 1993 but declared unneeded in 1995. A museum has been created there.

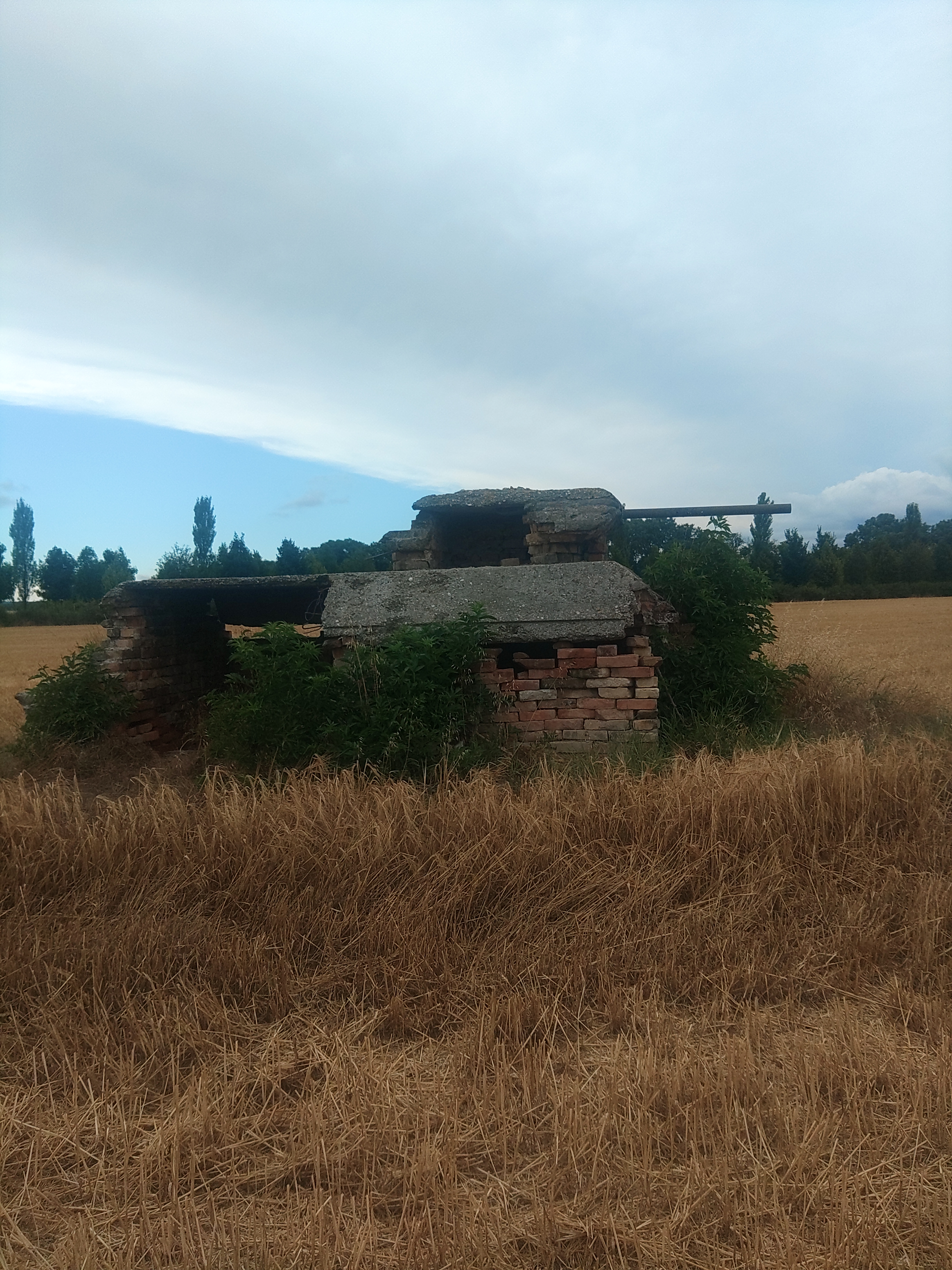
Betónový tank south of Bratislava

Many of the open museums are located between Ostrava and Opava, with more being near the town of Králíky near Kłodzko close to the present Polish border, which had been the German border before World War II. Of the nine artillery forts that were either completed or under construction by September 1938, six now function as museums while two are still used by the military with a further one not accessible.

== See also ==
- Czechoslovak border fortifications during the Cold War
- Fall Grün
- Museum of the fortifications in Hlučín
- Rupnik Line
- Çakmak Line
