= Makibishi =

Japanese version of the caltrop

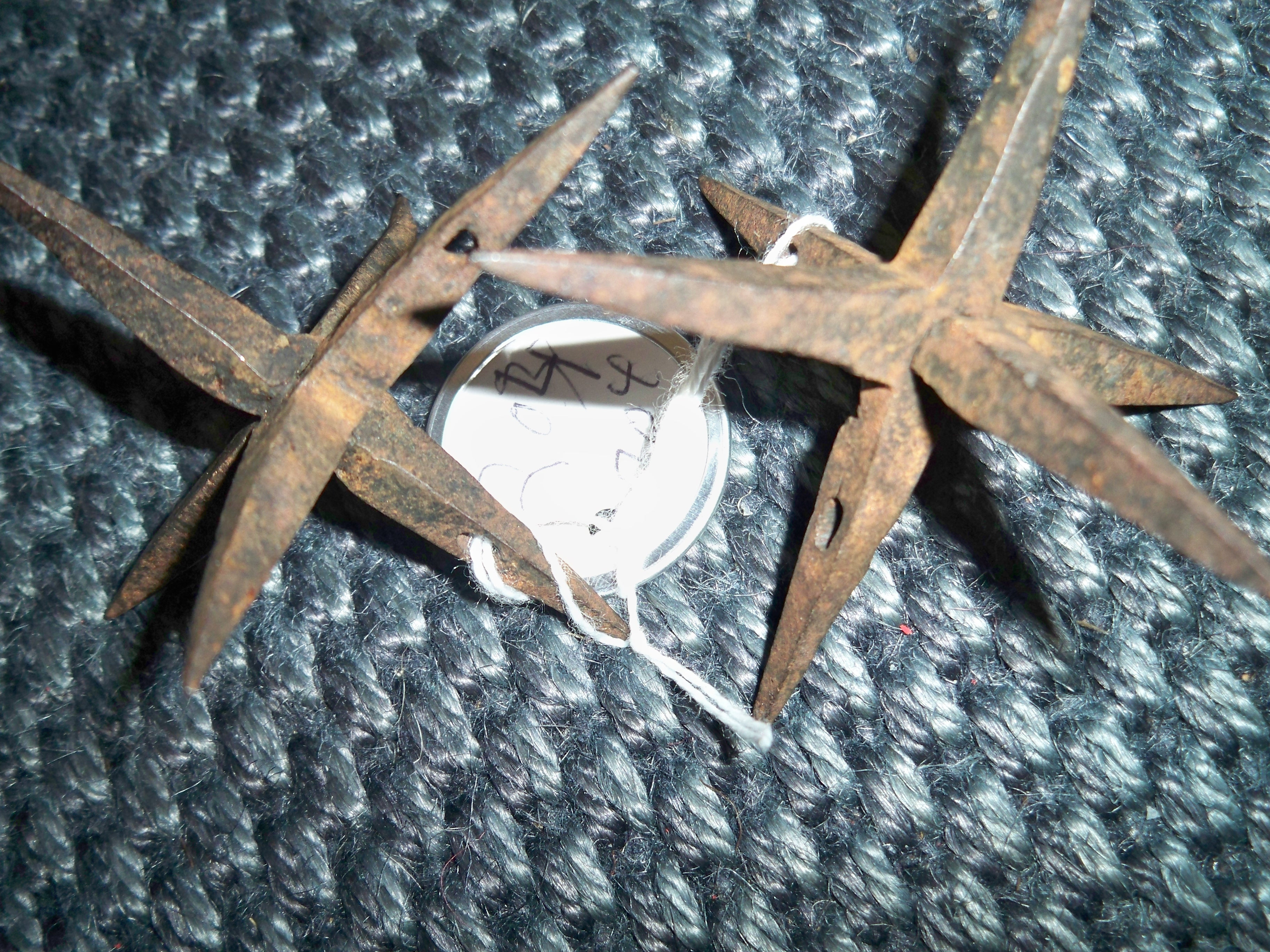
Japanese "makibishi" iron spikes, a type of caltrop

A makibishi (撒き菱 or 撒菱) is the Japanese version of the caltrop. The tool (igadama) is a sharp spiked object that was used in feudal Japan to slow down pursuers and also was used in the defense of samurai fortifications.

== Description ==
Makibishi was one of the items supposedly used by the ninja. It had six or eight pointed spikes. Iron makibishi were called tetsubishi while the makibishi made from the dried seed pod of the water caltrop formed a natural type of makibishi called tennenbishi. The term makibishi literally means "scattered water chestnut" in Japanese. Both types of makibishi could penetrate the thin soles of the shoes such as the waraji sandals that were commonly worn in feudal Japan when the makibishi was dropped on the ground or planted in advance.

Makibishi could be carried in a bag attached to a belt along with other commonly carried weapons and/or tools such as shuriken and kaginawa. Makibishi could be thrown like a shuriken and could also be used against an enemy on horseback. Modifications made by the ninja included serrated tips, which were also said to be occasionally coated with poison.
