= Czechoslovak border fortifications during the Cold War =

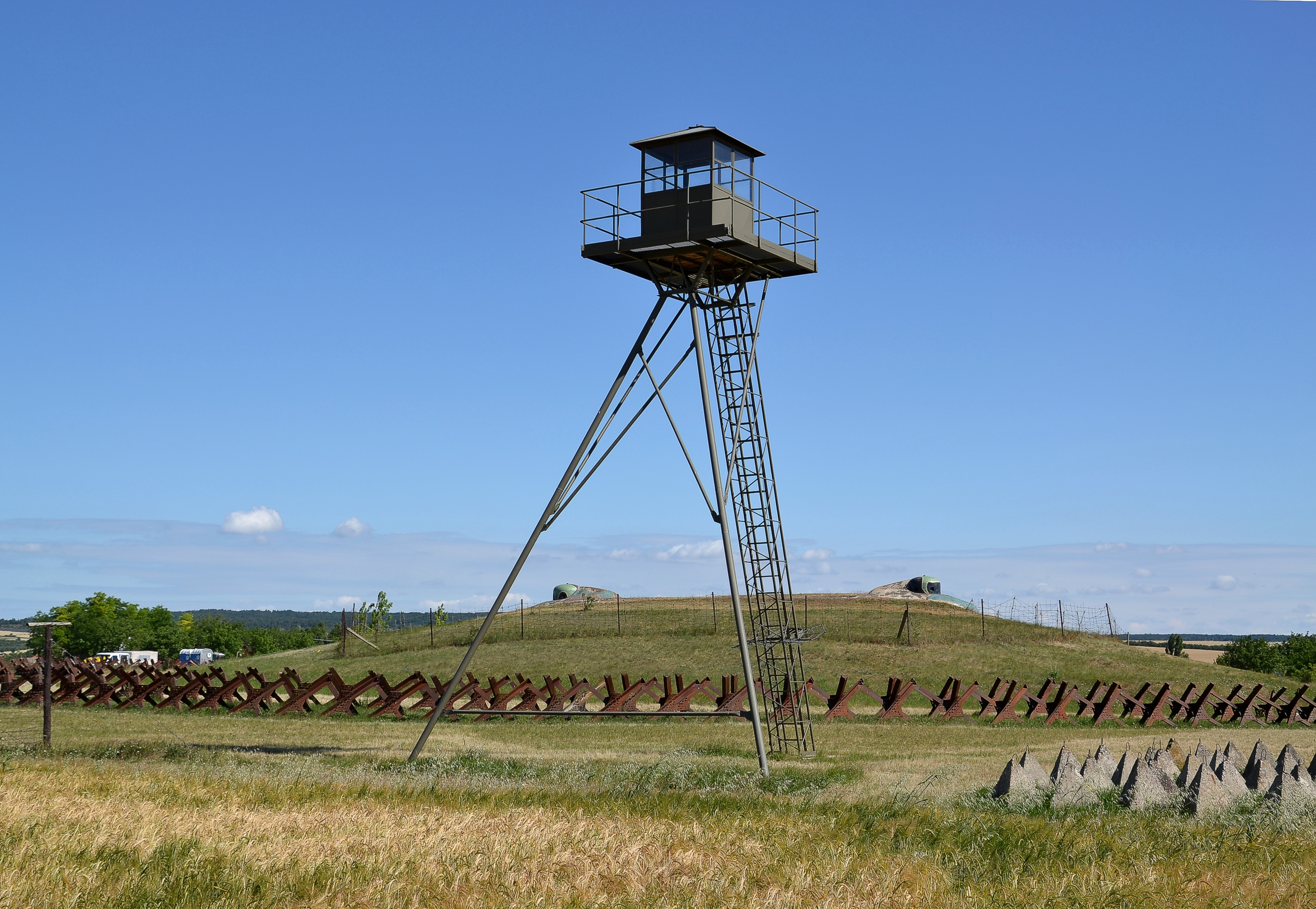
Reactivated Czechoslovak blockhouse and watch tower of the border guard near Šatov

From 1946 to 1964, Czechoslovakia built fortifications along the south and south-western frontier, on the common border with the capitalist countries of West Germany and Austria. Unlike the Czechoslovak section of the Iron Curtain, whose main function was to prevent citizens of the Eastern Bloc escaping to the West, the purpose of these border fortifications was defence against possible German revanchist aggression and later also against possible attack by NATO forces.

At the outset, the defence system was based on the installations of the pre-war permanent fortifications, repaired and re-equipped in the years 1946–1953. After 1950, due to the increased tension between the Eastern and Western Blocs, a more sophisticated system of pillboxes and shelters was built. While the pre-war blockhouses and pillboxes were designed as monoliths of reinforced concrete, the new cold-war bunkers followed the Soviet paradigm and were more like reinforced field fortifications, built from stone and prefabricated concrete elements. Many of the installations from the period 1953–1964, especially those built at the time of Berlin and Cuban crises, were designed for conditions of nuclear war, and many older installations were given enhanced protection against weapons of mass destruction.

Unlike the Iron Curtain installations, most of the installations were unmanned and unarmed and were to be manned only in the case of war, by the regular army, although some of the light pillboxes could be used also by Border guard. Only the large fortresses were permanently crewed, by a specially trained heavy fortification company.

The special fortification unit of the Czech Army was disbanded in 1999. Since then, the bunkers were sealed and abandoned. In recent years some of the bunkers were purchased or leased by reenactment groups or private persons, reconstructed and opened as the museums of Czechoslovak military.

== Bibliography ==
- DUBÁNEK, Martin; LAKOSIL, Jan; MINAŘÍK, Pavel. Utajená obrana železné opony: Československé opevnění 1945–1964. Praha : Mladá fronta, 2008. 216 s. ISBN 978-80-204-1758-9.
- LAKOSIL, Jan. Utajená obrana Šumavy: Lehké opevnění jihozápadních hranic Československa od Mnichova po současnost. Praha : Mladá fronta, 2012. 328 s. ISBN 978-80-204-2791-5.
