= Stachelberg =

Fortress in the Czech Republic

Coordinates: 50°37′49.9″N 15°54′42.8″E

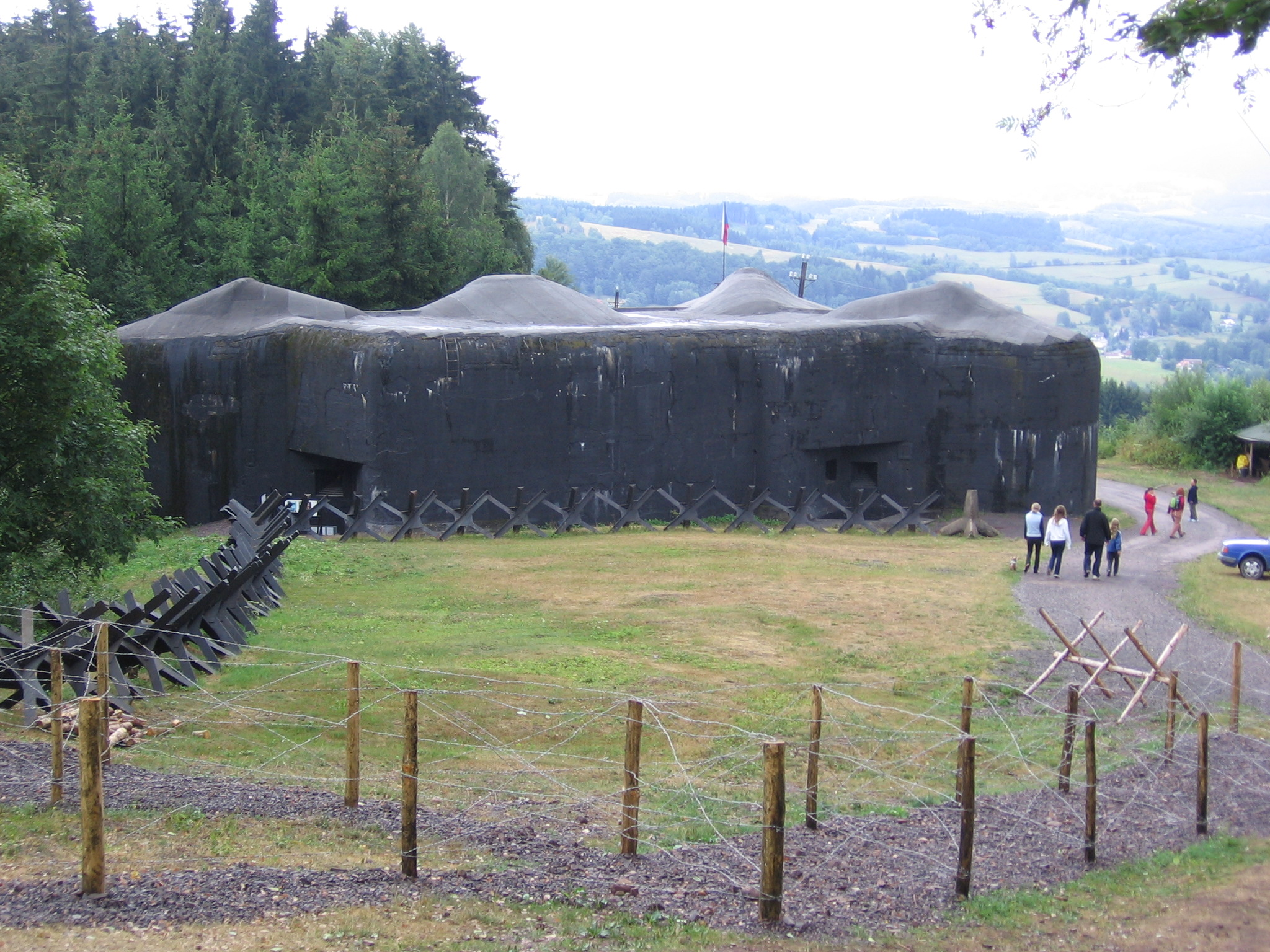
Stachelberg

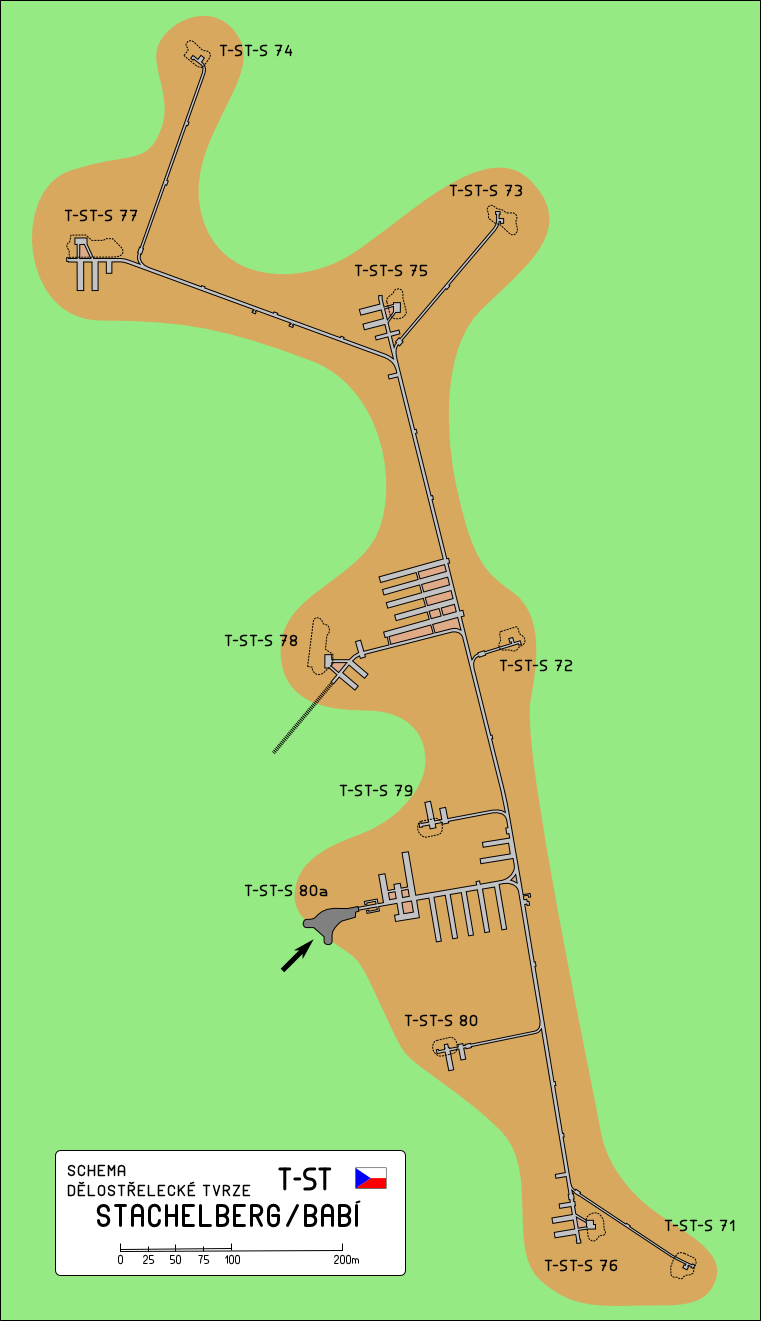
Map of underground

The Stachelberg fortress (Czech: Dělostřelecká tvrz Stachelberg) also known as Ježová hora, is one of the largest fortresses in the Czech Republic. It was being built as a complex of 12 bunkers between 1937 and 1938 as a Czechoslovak fort. However, the process of construction was stopped due to the Munich Agreement in 1938. As a result, the fortress has never been finished.

== Location ==
The Stachelberg fortress is located just northwest of Babí, between Trutnov and Žacléř. Moreover, there is Rýchorský prales (Virgin Forest) close to it. The place is frequently called the foot of the Krkonoše (Giant Mountains).

== Purpose of its construction ==
The Stachelberg fortress was built as protection for Labavské sedlo (Saddleback), which is the land gate between the Krkonoše and Vraní hory. These places were usually a target of foreign armies and the Czech army led an attack on foreign armies from this place. However, the fortress has never been finished and nowadays it is used as an army museum.

== Current situation ==
The museum in Stachelberg has been opened since 1993 and the owners expand the accessible parts of the fortress every year. The last extension was accomplished in 2010, which extended the sightseeing for more than an hour. The visitors can see the whole of its underground barracks. The first owner of this fortress was Fortis company, which is located in Trutnov. However, the owner changed in 2005 and presently it is owned by the Stachelberg Civic Association, a group of enthusiasts who consider their job a hobby and do it voluntarily. The fortress is financed only by the visitors' entrance fee and occasionally by donors who are willing to help.

== Gallery ==
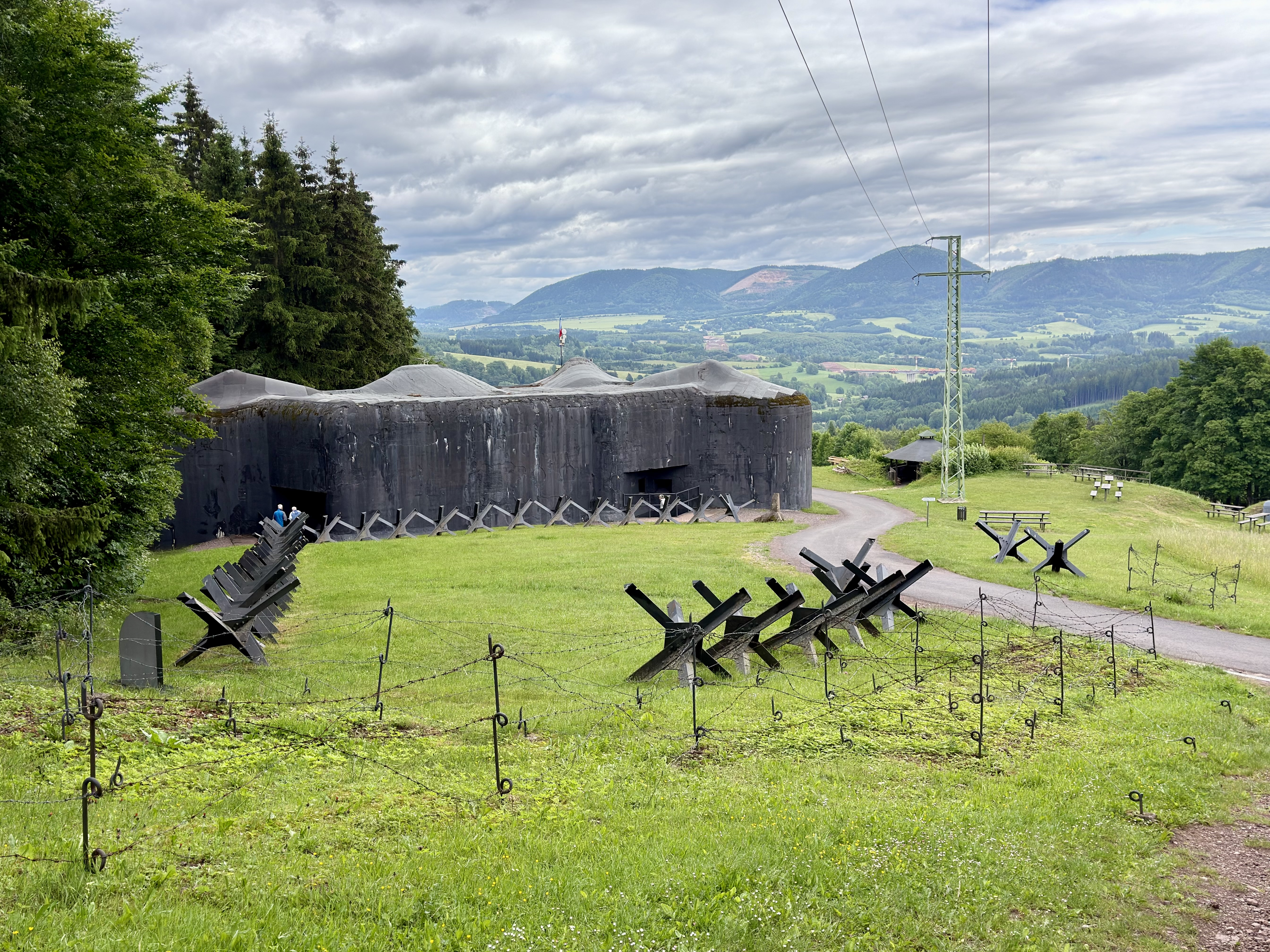

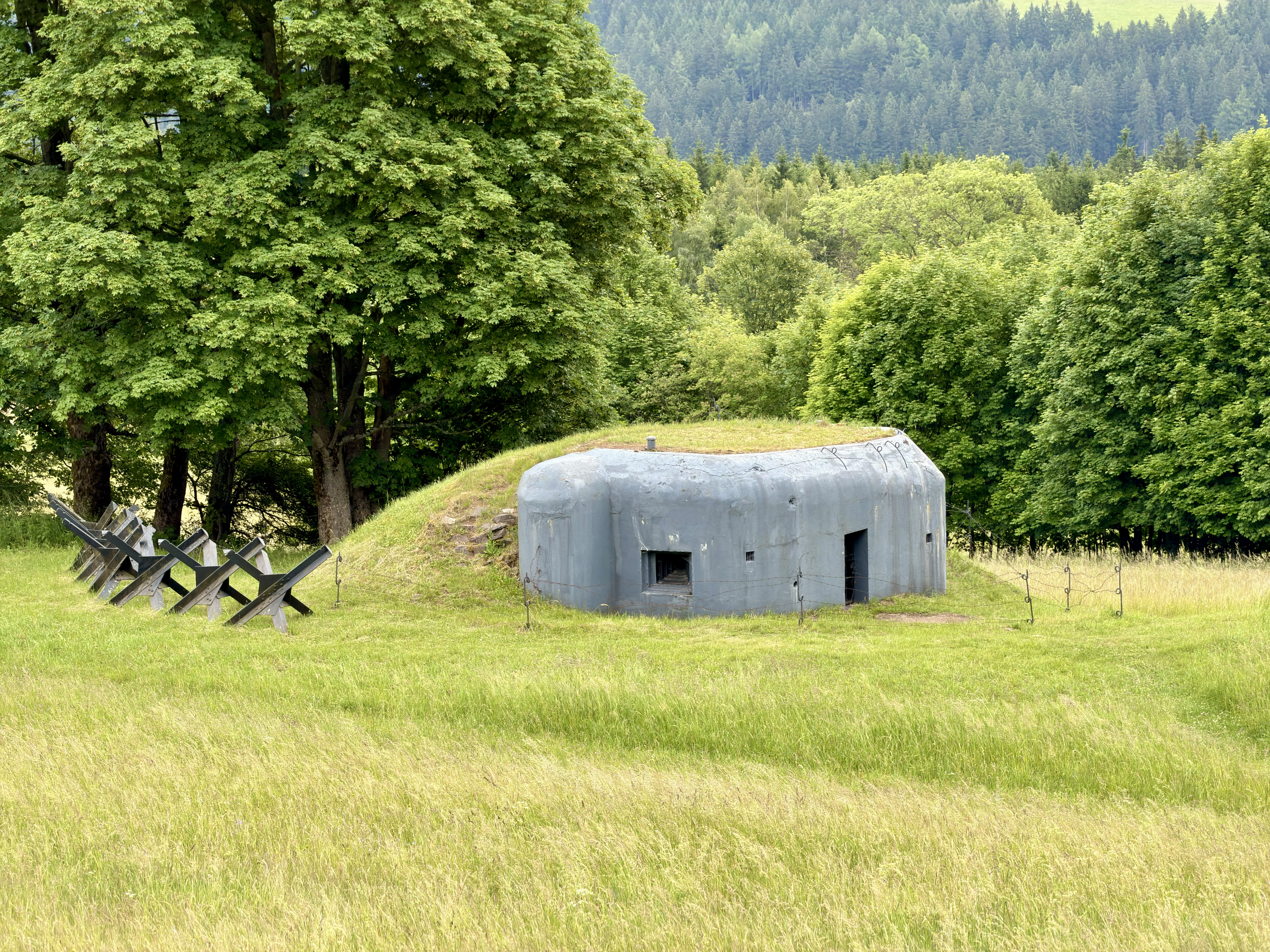

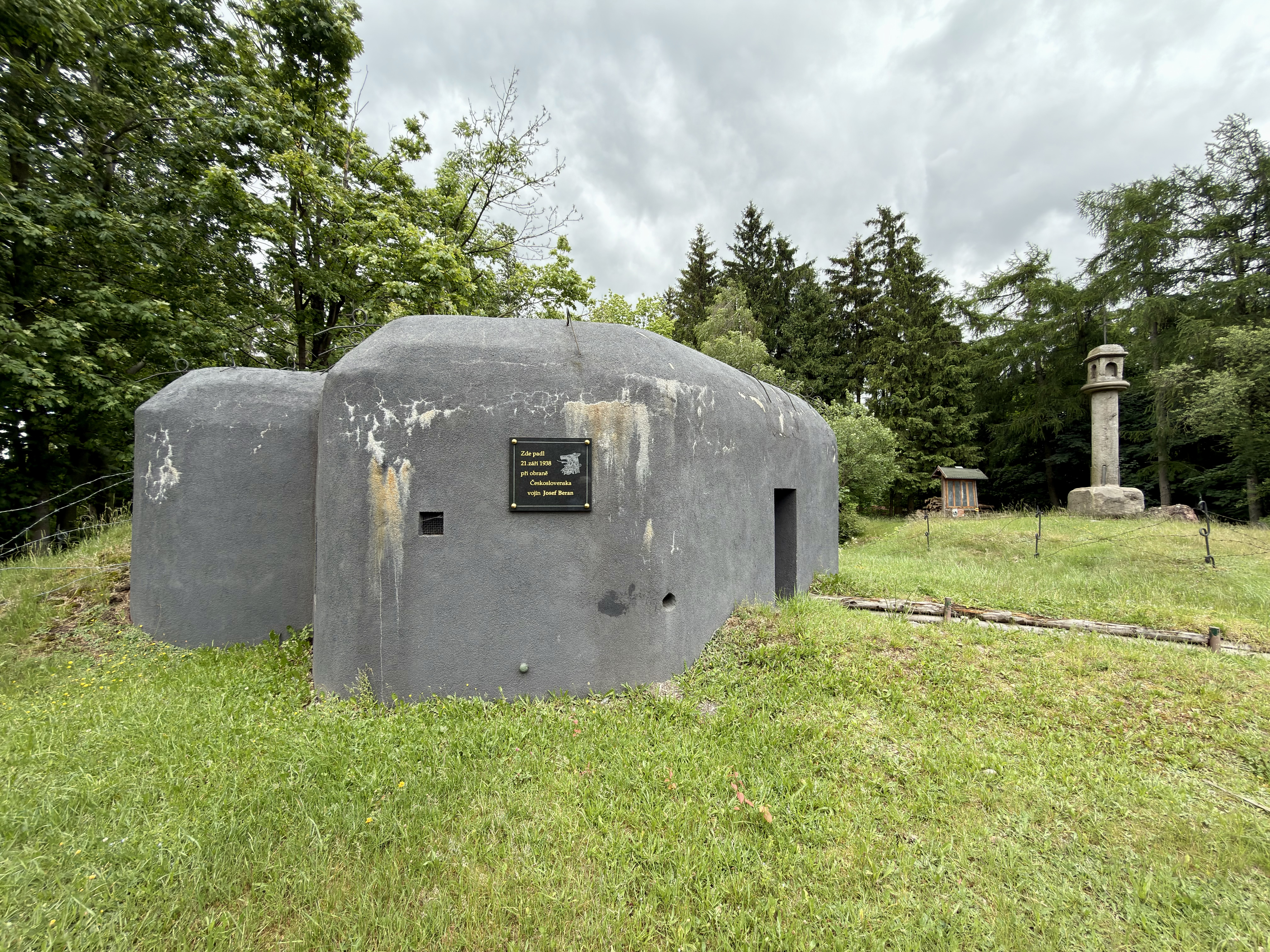

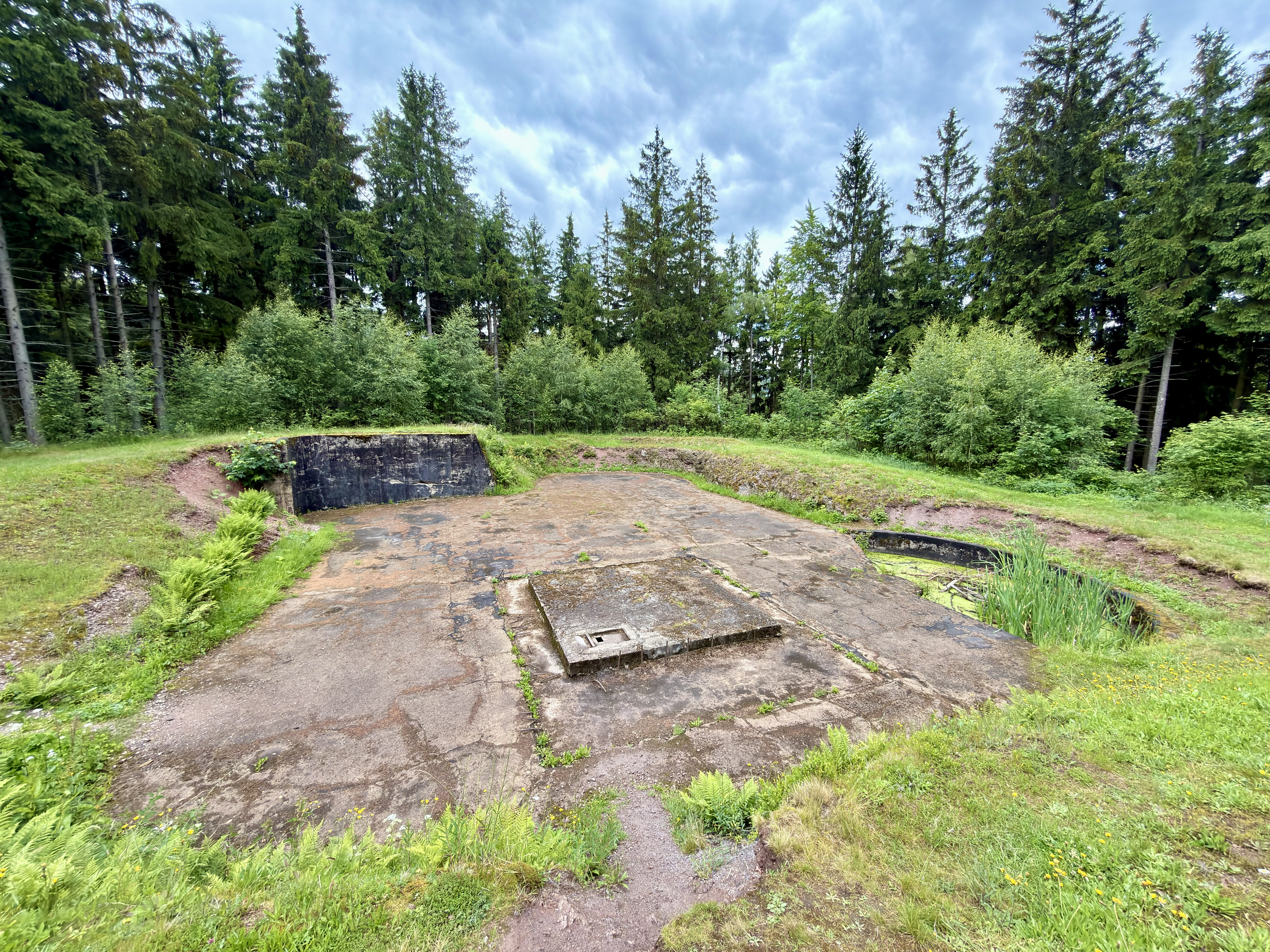
