= Ninja =

Mercenary and spy in feudal Japan

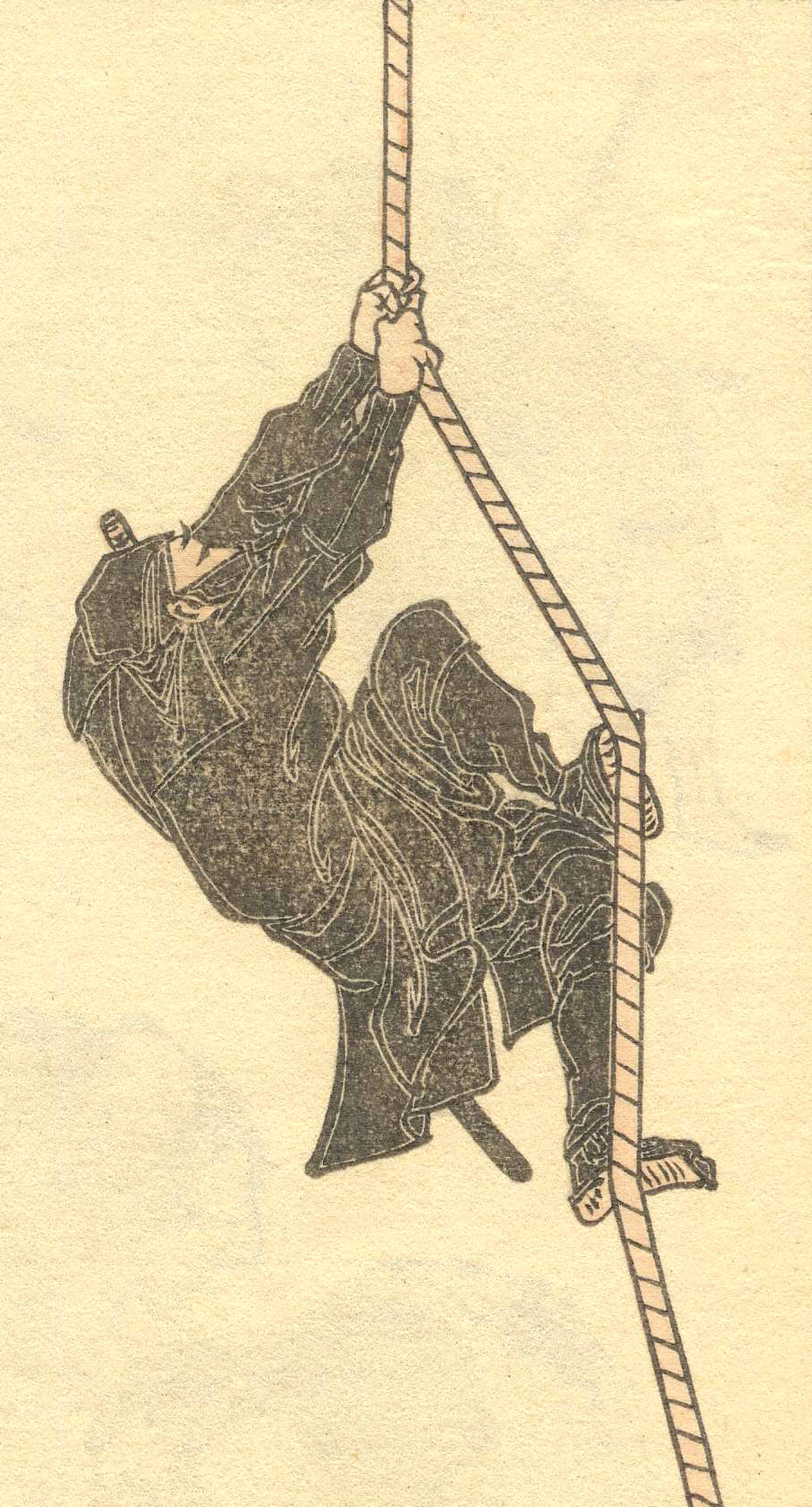
1817 illustration of an archetypal ninja by Hokusai

A ninja (忍者; English: /ˈnɪndʒə/, Japanese: [ɲiꜜɲ.dʑa]), shinobi no mono (忍びの者; Japanese: [ɕi.no.bʲi no mo.noꜜ]) or shinobi (忍び; Japanese: [ɕi.no.bʲi]) was a spy and infiltrator in pre-modern Japan. Antecedents may have existed as early as the 12th century. Despite popular belief, there is little evidence that ninja were assassins.

In the unrest of the Sengoku period, the jizamurai, peasant-warriors in Iga Province and the adjacent Kōka District, formed ikki – "revolts" or "leagues" – as a means of self-defense. They became known for their military activities in the nearby regions and sold their services as mercenaries and spies. Following the establishment of the Tokugawa shogunate in the 17th century, the ninja faded into obscurity.

== Etymology ==
The word "ninja" in kanji script

Ninja is the on'yomi (Early Middle Chinese–influenced) reading of the two kanji "忍者". In the native kun'yomi reading, it is pronounced shinobi, a shortened form of shinobi-no-mono (忍びの者).

The word shinobi appears in the written record as far back as the late 8th century in poems in the Man'yōshū. The literal meaning of shinobi (忍) is "to steal away; to hide" and—by extension—"to forbear", hence its association with stealth and invisibility. Mono (者) means "a person".

Historically, the word ninja was not in common use, and a variety of regional colloquialisms evolved to describe what would later be dubbed ninja. Along with shinobi, these include monomi ("one who sees"), nokizaru ("macaque on the roof"), rappa ("ruffian"), kusa ("grass") and Iga-mono ("one from Iga"). In historical documents, shinobi is almost always used.

In modern fiction, kunoichi (くノ一) is also another word used to describe ninja, specifically female ones. It was originally argot for "woman". It supposedly comes from the characters く (ku), ノ (no), and 一 (ichi), which make up the three strokes that form the kanji for "woman" (女).

In English, the plural of ninja can be either unchanged as ninja, reflecting the Japanese language's lack of grammatical number, or the regular English plural ninjas.

== History ==
Despite many popular folktales, historical accounts of the ninja are scarce. The social origin of the ninja is seen as the reason they agree to operate in secret, trading their service for money without honor and glory. The first dubbed ninja was a man named Otomono Sahito, though historical evidence of his existence is scarce.

However, some ninjutsu books described specifically what tactics ninja should use to fight, and the scenarios in which a ninja might find themselves can be deduced from those tactics. For example, in the manuscript of volume 2 of Kanrin Seiyō (間林清陽) which is the original book of Bansenshūkai (万川集海), there are 48 points of ninja's fighting techniques, such as how to make makibishi from bamboo, how to make footwear that makes no sound, fighting techniques when surrounded by many enemies, precautions when using swords at night, how to listen to small sounds, kuji-kiri that prevents guard dogs from barking, and so on.

=== Predecessors ===
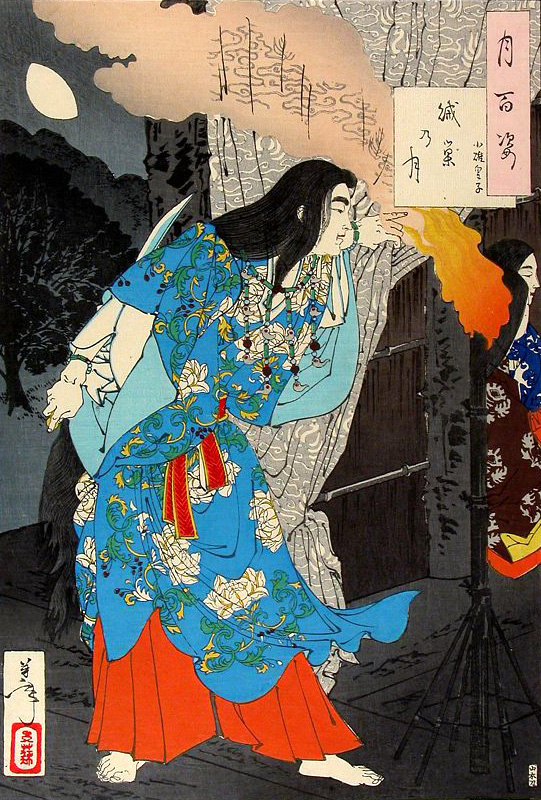
Yamato Takeru dressed as a maidservant, preparing to kill the Kumaso leaders. Woodblock print on paper. Yoshitoshi, 1886.

The title ninja has sometimes been attributed retrospectively to the semi-legendary 2nd-century prince Yamato Takeru.

Prince Shotoku, who lived from 574–622 AD, was believed to have employed a ninja spy named Otomono Sahito.

In the Kojiki, the young Yamato Takeru disguised himself as a charming maiden and assassinated two chiefs of the Kumaso people. However, these records take place at a very early stage of Japanese history, and they are unlikely to be connected to the shinobi of later accounts. The first recorded use of espionage was under the employment of Prince Shōtoku in the 6th century. Such tactics were considered unsavory even in early times, when, according to the 10th-century Shōmonki, the boy spy Hasetsukabe no Koharumaru was killed for spying against the insurgent Taira no Masakado.

The history of Ninjitsu schools recorded around the 12th century, when Daisuke Togakure and Kain Doshi formalized the teaching of Chinese and native Japanese guerilla tactics to which was as counter-culture of the time. As a samurai, Daisuke lost his lands and title after being defeated in a regional conflict. Refusing to commit Seppuku, Daisuke travelled to the mountains of southwest Honshu in 1162. Here, he met Doshi, a Chinese warrior-monk. Daisuke abandoned his way of bushido, and worked with Doshi to formulate the guerilla art of war called ninjutsu. Daisuke's descendants founded the first ninja-ryu, or ninja school, the Togakureryu.

Later, the 14th-century war chronicle Taiheiki contained many references to shinobi and credited the destruction of a castle by fire to an unnamed but "highly skilled shinobi".

=== Early history ===
It was not until the 15th century that spies were specially trained for their purpose. It was around this time that the word shinobi appeared to define and clearly identify ninja as a secretive group of agents. Evidence for this can be seen in historical documents, which began to refer to stealthy soldiers as shinobi during the Sengoku period. Later manuals regarding espionage are often grounded in Chinese military strategy, quoting works such as The Art of War by Sun Tzu.

By the Sengoku period, the shinobi had several roles, including spy (kanchō), scout (teisatsu), surprise attacker (kishu), and agitator (konran). The ninja families were organized into larger guilds, each with their own territories. A system of rank existed. A jōnin ("upper person") was the highest rank, representing the group and hiring out mercenaries. This is followed by the chūnin ("middle person"), assistants to the jōnin. At the bottom was the genin ("lower person"), field agents drawn from the lower class and assigned to carry out actual missions.

=== Iga and Kōga clans ===
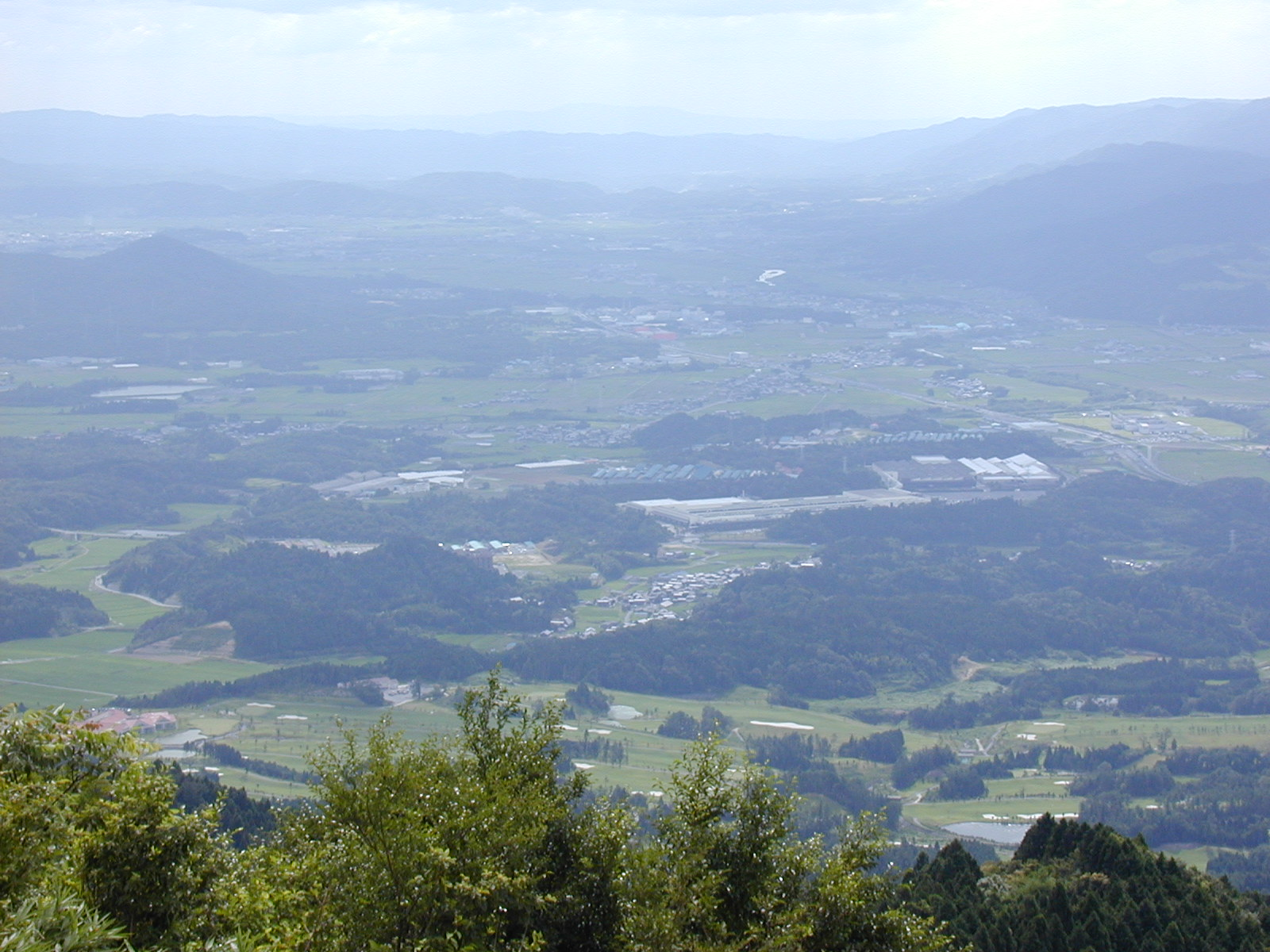
The plains of Iga, nested in secluded mountains, gave rise to villages specialized in the training of ninja.

The Iga and Kōga "clans" were jizamurai families living in the province of Iga (modern Mie Prefecture) and the adjacent region of Kōka (later written as Kōga), named after a village in what is now Shiga Prefecture. From these regions, villages devoted to the training of ninja first appeared. The remoteness and inaccessibility of the surrounding mountains in Iga may have had a role in the ninja's secretive development. The chronicle Go Kagami Furoku writes, of the two clans' origins:

There was a retainer of the family of Kawai Aki-no-kami of Iga, of pre-eminent skill in shinobi, and consequently for generations the name of people from Iga became established. Another tradition grew in Kōga.

Likewise, a supplement to the Nochi Kagami, a record of the Ashikaga shogunate, confirms the same Iga origin:

Inside the camp at Magari of the shōgun [Ashikaga] Yoshihisa there were shinobi whose names were famous throughout the land. When Yoshihisa attacked Rokkaku Takayori, the family of Kawai Aki-no-kami of Iga, who served him at Magari, earned considerable merit as shinobi in front of the great army of the shōgun. Since then, successive generations of Iga men have been admired. This is the origin of the fame of the men of Iga.

These professional ninjas were actively hired by daimyōs between 1485 and 1581. Specifically, the Iga professionals were sought after for their skill at siege warfare, or "shirotori", which included night attacks and ambush. By the 1460s, the leading families in the regions had established de facto independence from their shugo. The Kōka ikki persisted until 1574, when it was forced to become a vassal of Oda Nobunaga. The Iga ikki continued until 1581, when Nobunaga invaded Iga Province and wiped out the organized clans. Survivors were forced to flee, some to the mountains of Kii, but others arrived before Tokugawa Ieyasu, where they were well treated. Some former Iga clan members, including Hattori Hanzō, would later serve as Tokugawa's bodyguards. Prior to the conquest of Kōka in 1574, the two confederacies worked in alliance together. At an approximate date of 1560, the alliance between Iga and Kōka was formalized in constitutional document.

Following the Battle of Okehazama in 1560, Tokugawa employed a group of eighty Kōga ninja, led by Tomo Sukesada. They were tasked to raid an outpost of the Imagawa clan. The account of this assault is given in the Mikawa Go Fudoki, where it was written that Kōga ninja infiltrated the castle, set fire to its towers, and killed the castellan along with two hundred of the garrison.

=== Iga Ninja theory's controversy ===
After the assassination of Oda Nobunaga, the Iga and Kōka ninja helped Ieyasu undergo the famous Shinkun Iga-goe journey to escape Nobunaga's enemies in Sakai and return to Mikawa, according to tradition. However, one theory by Mie University researchers suggests that the Kōka clan's Jizamurai militias, not ninja, provided the help. (Note: Modern scholar such as Tatsuo Fujita doubted the credibility of Hattori Hanzō's ninja army theory, since it was first appeared in Iga-sha yuishogaki record which circulated in Edo period during the rule of Shogun Tokugawa Yoshimune. Fujita argued that the circulation of the myth about Hanzō's ninja army helping Ieyasu was created as propaganda to increase the prestige of the Iga and Koka clan confederations in Tokugawa Shogunate.)

Their journey was very dangerous due to the existence of "Ochimusha-gari" groups across the route. (Note: According to Imatani Akira, professor of Tsuru University, and Ishikawa Tadashi, assistant professor University of Central Florida, during Sengoku period a particularly dangerous groups called "Ochimusha-gari" or "fallen warrior hunter" groups has emerged. these groups were disenfranchised peasants or Rōnin who had been displaced by war. They formed self-defense forces which operates outside the law, while in actuality they often resorted to hunt samurais or soldiers who has been defeated in wars.) During this journey, Tokugawa generals such as Ii Naomasa, Sakai Tadatsugu and Honda Tadakatsu fought their way through raids and harassment from Ochimusha-gari outlaws to secure the way for Ieyasu, while sometimes advancing by usage of gold and silver bribes given to some of the more amenable Ochimusha-gari groups. As they reached Kada, an area between Kameyama town and Iga, the attacks from Ochimusha-gari finally ended as they reached the former territory of the Kōka ikki, who were friendly to the Tokugawa clan. The Koka clan helped the Tokugawa escort group eliminate the Ochimusha-gari outlaw threat. Then, they escorted the group until they reached Iga Province, where they were further protected by samurai clans from Iga ikki which accompanied the Ieyasu group until they safely reached Mikawa.

It was reported by Edo period traditional records that Hattori Hanzō, a Tokugawa vassal from Iga, negotiated with Iga ninjas to hire them as guards along the way to avoid the ochimusha-gari. The local Koka-Ikki ninjas and Iga-Ikki ninjas under Hanzo who helped Ieyasu to travel into safety consisted of 300 Ninjas. Furthermore, Uejima Hidetomo, a researcher of Iga Ninja history, has stated there is research which revealed that Hattori Yasuji, one of the ninjas who accompanied Ieyasu on his journey in Iga province, also served as a bodyguard and espionage officer under Muromachi Shogun Ashikaga Yoshiaki.

However, a modern scholar such as Tatsuo Fujita doubted the credibility of Hattori Hattori Hanzō's ninja army theory, since it was first appeared in Iga-sha yuishogaki record which circulated in Edo period during the rule of Shogun Tokugawa Yoshimune. During his rule, Yoshimune were known for establishing the Oniwaban secret police institution whose members hailed from the confederation clans of Koka and Iga. It has been argued that the circulation of the myth about Hattori Hanzō ninja army helping Ieyasu was created as propaganda to increase the prestige of the Iga and Koka clan confederations in Tokugawa Shogunate.

=== Activities under Tokugawa ===
In one notable incident from 1600, a ninja snuck through Eastern Army defenders during the Siege of Hataya and planted the flag of the besieging army high on the front gate.

In 1608, a daimyo named Tōdō Takatora was assigned by Ieyasu to control of Tsu, a newly established domain which covered portions of Iga and Ise Province. The domain at first worth of to the 220,000, then grow further in productivity to the total revenue of 320,000 koku under Takatora governance. It was reported that Tōdō Takatora employs the Iga-ryū Ninjas. Aside from Ninjas, he also employs local clans of Iga province as "Musokunin", which is a class of part time Samurai who has been allowed to retain their clan name but does not own any land or Han. The Musokunin also worked as farmer during peace, while they are obliged to take arms in the time of war.

In 1614, the Iga province warriors saw action during the siege of Osaka. Takatora brought the Musokunin auxiliaries from Iga province to besiege the Osaka castle during the winter phase.

=== Shimabara rebellion ===
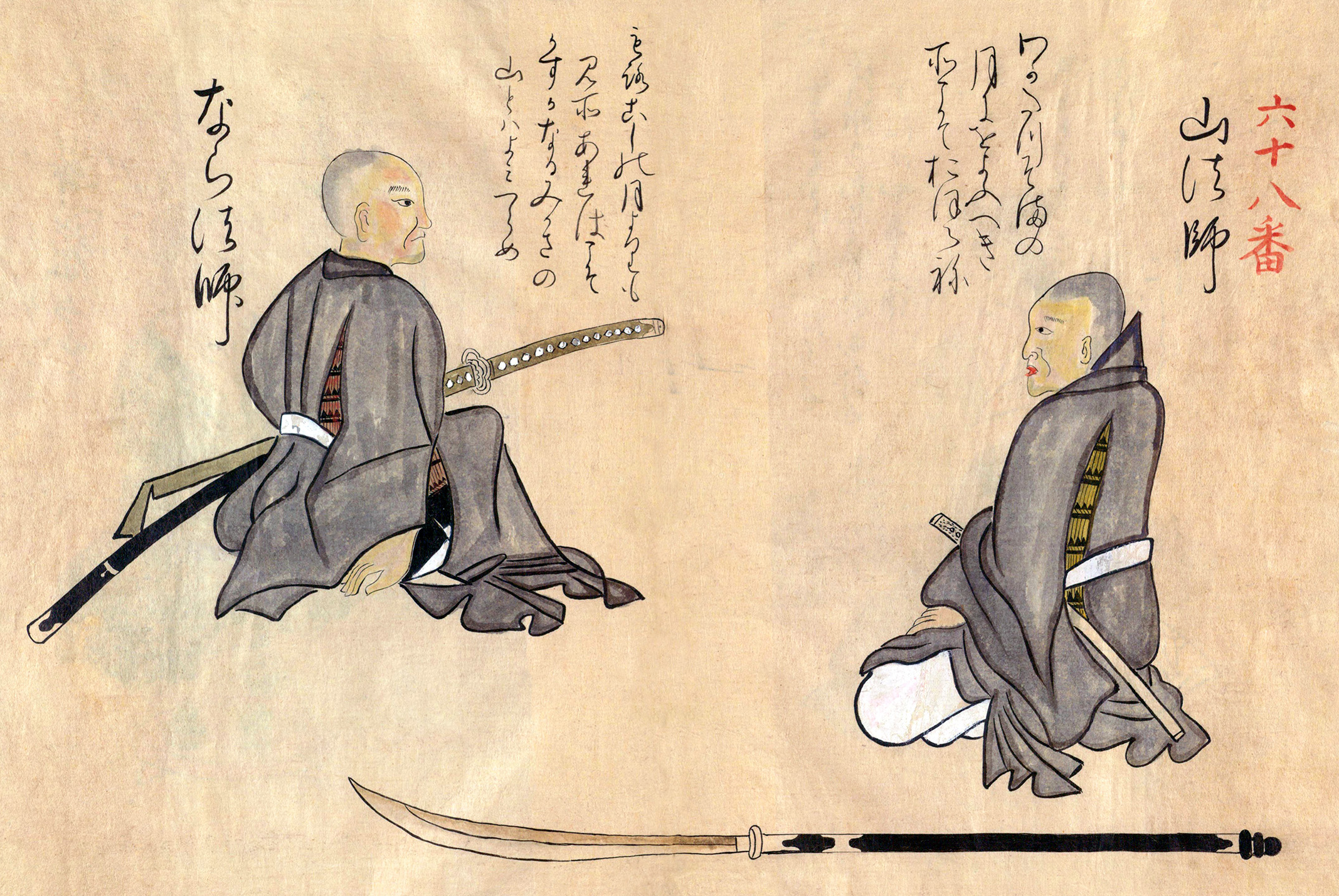
Ninja historic illustration, Meiwa era, c. 1770

A final but detailed record of ninja employed in open warfare occurred during the Shimabara Rebellion (1637–1638). The Kōga ninja were recruited by shōgun Tokugawa Iemitsu against Christian rebels led by Amakusa Shirō, who made a final stand at Hara Castle, in Hizen Province. A diary kept by a member of the Matsudaira clan, the Amakusa Gunki, relates: "Men from Kōga in Ōmi Province who concealed their appearance would steal up to the castle every night and go inside as they pleased."

The Ukai diary, written by a descendant of Ukai Kanemon, has several entries describing the reconnaissance actions taken by the Kōga.

They [the Kōga] were ordered to reconnoitre the plan of construction of Hara Castle, and surveyed the distance from the defensive moat to the ni-no-maru (second bailey), the depth of the moat, the conditions of roads, the height of the wall, and the shape of the loopholes.

— Entry: 6th day of the 1st month

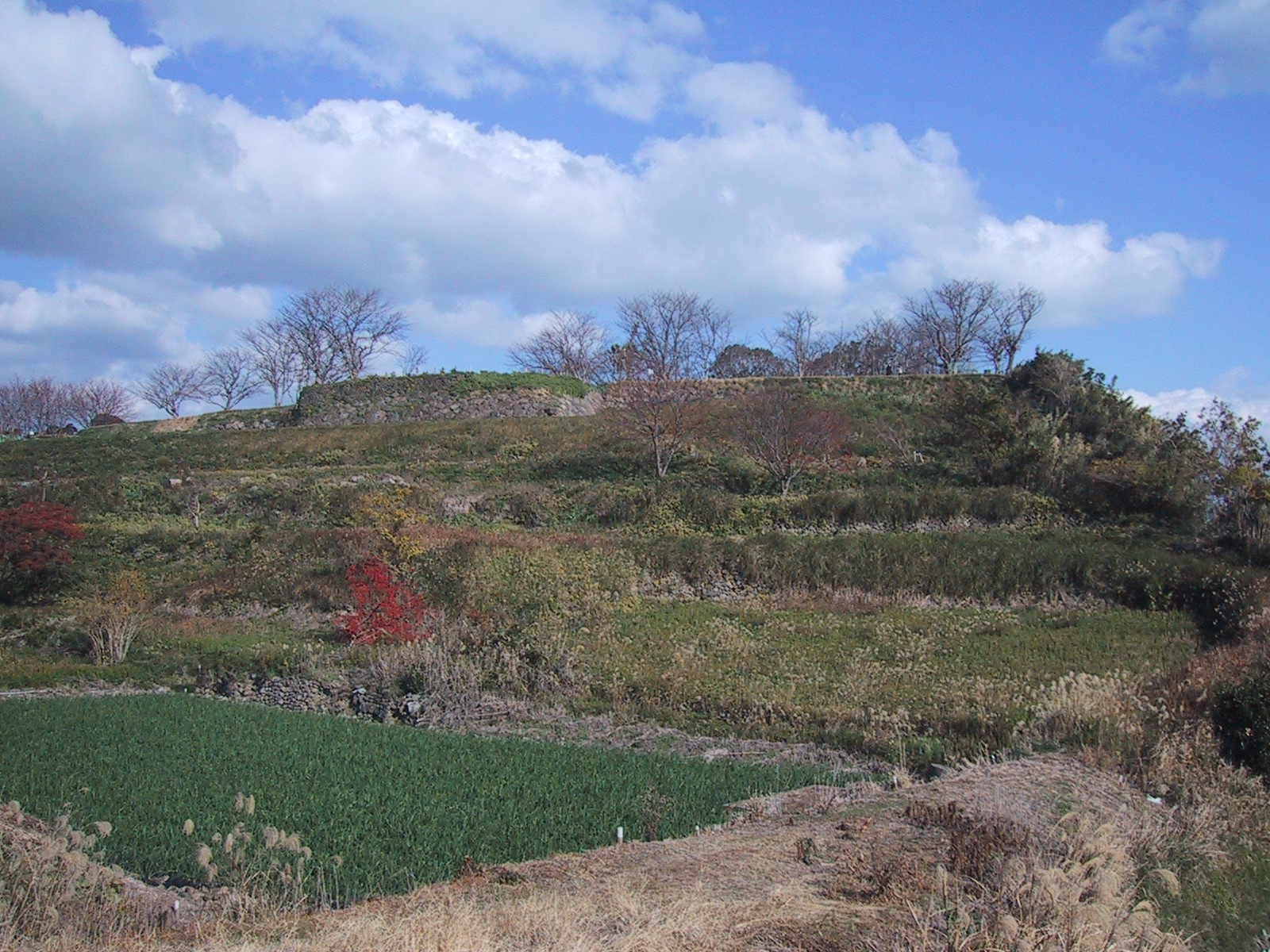
The ruins of Hara Castle

Suspecting that the castle's supplies might be running low, the siege commander Matsudaira Nobutsuna ordered a raid on the castle's provisions. Here, the Kōga captured bags of enemy provisions, and infiltrated the castle by night, obtaining secret passwords. Days later, Nobutsuna ordered an intelligence gathering mission to determine the castle's supplies. Several Kōga ninja—some apparently descended from those involved in the 1562 assault on an Imagawa clan castle—volunteered despite being warned that chances of survival were slim. A volley of shots was fired into the sky, causing the defenders to extinguish the castle lights in preparation. Under the cloak of darkness, ninja disguised as defenders infiltrated the castle, capturing a banner of the Christian cross. The Ukai diary writes,

We dispersed spies who were prepared to die inside Hara castle. ... those who went on the reconnaissance in force captured an enemy flag; both Arakawa Shichirobei and Mochizuki Yo'emon met extreme resistance and suffered from their serious wounds for 40 days.

— Entry: 27th day of the 1st month

As the siege went on, the extreme shortage of food later reduced the defenders to eating moss and grass. This desperation would mount to futile charges by the rebels, where they were eventually defeated by the shogunate army. The Kōga would later take part in conquering the castle:

More and more general raids were begun, the Kōga ninja band under the direct control of Matsudaira Nobutsuna captured the ni-no-maru and the san-no-maru (outer bailey)

— Entry: 24th day of the 2nd month

With the fall of Hara Castle, the Shimabara Rebellion came to an end, and Christianity in Japan was forced underground. These written accounts are the last mention of ninja in war.

=== Edo period ===
After the Shimabara Rebellion, there were almost no major wars or battles until the bakumatsu era. To earn a living, ninja had to be employed by the governments of their Han (domain), or change their profession. Many lords still hired ninja, not for battle but as bodyguards or spies. Their duties included spying on other domains, guarding the daimyō, and fire patrol. A few domains like Tsu, Hirosaki and Saga continued to employ their own ninja into the bakumatsu era, although their precise numbers are unknown.

A number of shinobi manuals, often based on Chinese military philosophy, were written in the 17th and 18th centuries, most notably the Bansenshūkai (1676).

Many former ninja were employed as security guards by the Tokugawa shogunate, though the role of espionage was transferred to newly created organizations like the onmitsu and the oniwaban. Others used their ninjutsu knowledge to become doctors, medicine sellers, merchants, martial artists, and fireworks manufacturers. Some unemployed ninja were reduced to banditry, such as Fūma Kotarō and Ishikawa Goemon.

Ninja employed in each domain, Edo period
| Han (domain) | Number of ninja |
| Kishū Domain | 200+ |
| Kishiwada Domain | 50 |
| Kawagoe Domain | 50 |
| Matsue Domain | 30 |
| Hirosaki Domain | 20 |
| Fukui Domain | 12 |
| Hikone Domain | 10 |
| Okayama Domain | 10 |
| Akō Domain | 5 |

==== Ninja stereotypes in theatre ====
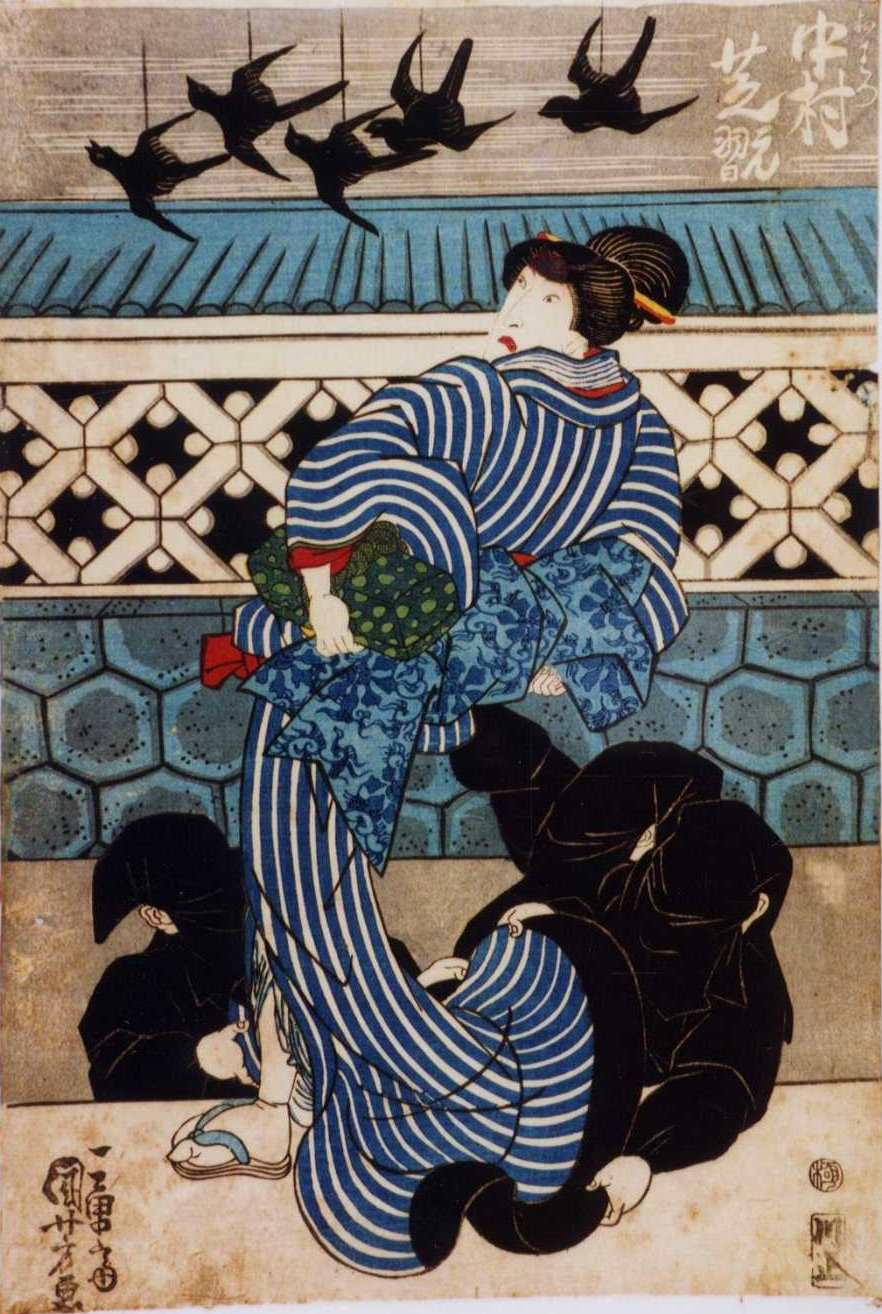
In Sakura doki onna gyoretsu, this onnagata is attended by three kuroko.

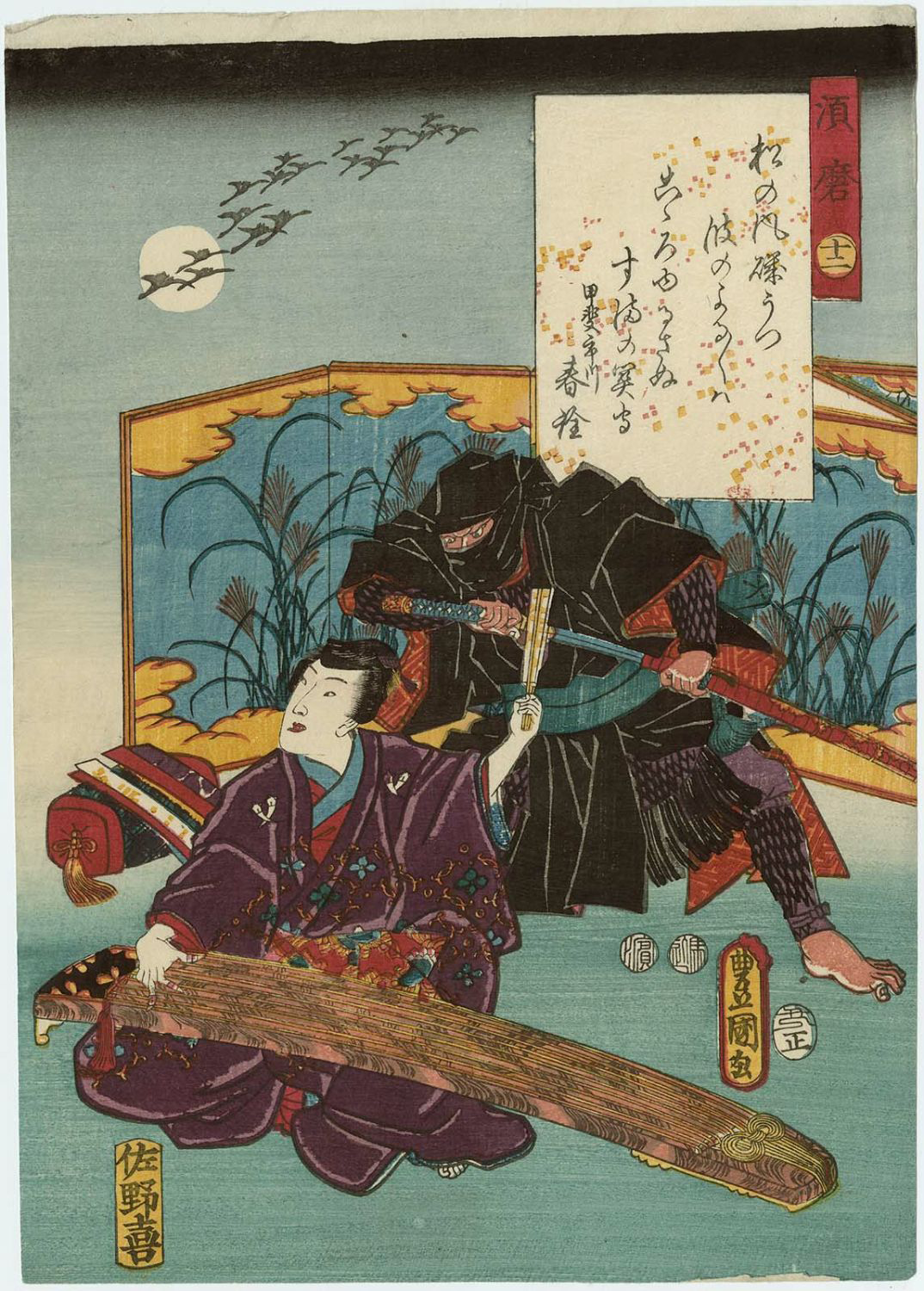
In Nise Murasaki Inaka Genji, Ashikaga Mitsuuji is approached unknowingly by a ninja.

Two prints depicting kabuki plays. In Japanese theatre, ninja are often dressed as kuroko, stagehands in black suits, to make their attacks seem more surprising. This practice gave rise to their stereotypical black outfits.

Many ubiquitous stereotypes about ninjas were developed within Edo theatre. These include their black clothing, which was supposed to imitate the outfits worn by kuroko, stagehands meant to be ignored by the audience; and their use of shuriken, which was meant to contrast with the use of swords by onstage samurai. In kabuki theatre, ninja were "dishonorable and often sorcerous counterparts" to samurai, and possessed "almost, if not outright, magical means of camouflage."

=== Contemporary ===
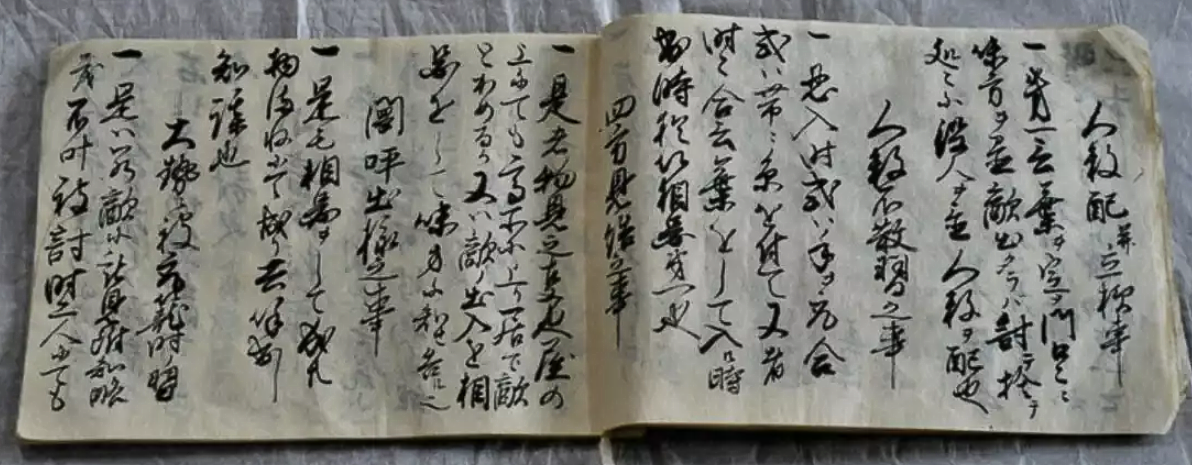
A copy of the legendary 40-page book called Kanrinseiyo made in 1748

Between 1960 and 2010 artifacts dating to the Siege of Odawara (1590) were uncovered which experts say are ninja weapons. Ninja were spies and saboteurs and likely participated in the siege. The Hojo clan failed to save the castle from Toyotomi Hideyoshi forces. The uncovered flat throwing stones are likely predecessors of the shuriken. The clay caltrops preceded makibishi caltrops. Archeologist Iwata Akihiro of Saitama Prefectural Museum of History and Folklore said the flat throwing stones "were used to stop the movement of the enemy who was going to attack [a soldier] at any moment, and while the enemy freezed the soldier escaped". The clay caltrops could "stop the movement of the enemy who invaded the castle," These weapons were hastily constructed yet effective and used by a "battle group which can move into action as ninjas".

Mie University founded the world's first research centre devoted to the ninja in 2017. A graduate master course opened in 2018. It is located in Iga (now Mie Prefecture). There are approximately 3 student enrollments per year. Students must pass an admission test about Japanese history and be able to read historical ninja documents. Scientific researchers and scholars of different disciplines study ancient documents and how it can be used in the modern world.

On June 19, 2022, Kōka city in Shiga Prefecture announced that a written copy of "Kanrinseiyo", which is the original source of a famous book on the art of ninja called "Bansenshukai" (1676) from the Edo period was discovered in a warehouse of Kazuraki Shrine. The handwritten reproduction was produced in 1748. The book describes 48 types of ninjutsu. It has information about specific methods such as attaching layers of cotton to the bottom of straw sandals to prevent noise when sneaking around, attacking to the right when surrounded by a large number of enemies, throwing charred owl and turtle powder when trying to hide, and casting spells. It also clarified methods and how to manufacture and use ninjutsu tools, such as cane swords and "makibishi" (Japanese caltrop).

== Roles ==
=== Espionage ===
Espionage was the chief role of the ninja. With the aid of disguises, the ninja gathered information on enemy terrain and building specifications, as well as obtaining passwords and communiques. The aforementioned supplement to the Nochi Kagami briefly describes the ninja's role in espionage:

Concerning ninja, they were said to be from Iga and Kōga, and went freely into enemy castles in secret. They observed hidden things, and were taken as being friends.

Later in history, the Kōga ninja would become regarded as agents of the Tokugawa bakufu, at a time when the bakufu used the ninja in an intelligence network to monitor regional daimyōs as well as the Imperial court.

=== Sabotage ===
Arson was the primary form of sabotage practiced by the ninja, who targeted castles and camps.

The Tamon-in Nikki (16th century)—a diary written by abbot Eishun of Kōfuku-ji temple—describes an arson attack on a castle by men of the Iga clans.

This morning, the sixth day of the 11th month of Tenbun 10 [1541], the Iga-shu entered Kasagi castle in secret and set fire to a few of the priests' quarters. They also set fire to outbuildings in various places inside the San-no-maru. They captured the ichi-no-maru (inner bailey) and the ni-no-maru (second bailey).

In 1558, Rokkaku Yoshikata employed a team of ninjas to set fire to Sawayama Castle. A chūnin captain led a force of 48 ninja into the castle by means of deception. In a technique dubbed bakemono-jutsu ("ghost technique"), his men stole a lantern bearing the enemy's family crest (mon), and proceeded to make replicas with the same mon. By wielding these lanterns, they were allowed to enter the castle without a fight. Once inside, the ninja set fire to the castle, and Yoshitaka's army would later emerge victorious. The mercenary nature of the shinobi is demonstrated in another arson attack soon after the burning of Sawayama Castle. In 1561, commanders acting under Kizawa Nagamasa hired three Iga ninja of genin rank to assist the conquest of a fortress in Maibara. Rokkaku Yoshitaka, the same man who had hired Iga ninja just years earlier, was the fortress holder—and target of attack. The Asai Sandaiki writes of their plans: "We employed shinobi-no-mono of Iga... They were contracted to set fire to the castle". However, the mercenary shinobi were unwilling to take commands. When the fire attack did not begin as scheduled, the Iga men told the commanders, who were not from the region, that they could not possibly understand the tactics of the shinobi. They then threatened to abandon the operation if they were not allowed to act on their own strategy. The fire was eventually set, allowing Nagamasa's army to capture the fortress in a chaotic rush.

=== Countermeasures ===
A variety of countermeasures were taken to prevent the activities of the ninja. Precautions were often taken against assassinations, such as weapons concealed in the lavatory, or under a removable floorboard. Buildings were constructed with traps and trip wires attached to alarm bells.

Japanese castles were designed to be difficult to navigate, with winding routes leading to the inner compound. Blind spots and holes in walls provided constant surveillance of these labyrinthine paths, as exemplified in Himeji Castle. Nijō Castle in Kyoto is constructed with long "nightingale" floors, which rested on metal hinges (uguisu-bari) specifically designed to squeak loudly when walked over. Grounds covered with gravel also provided early notice of unwanted intruders, and segregated buildings allowed fires to be better contained.

== Famous people ==
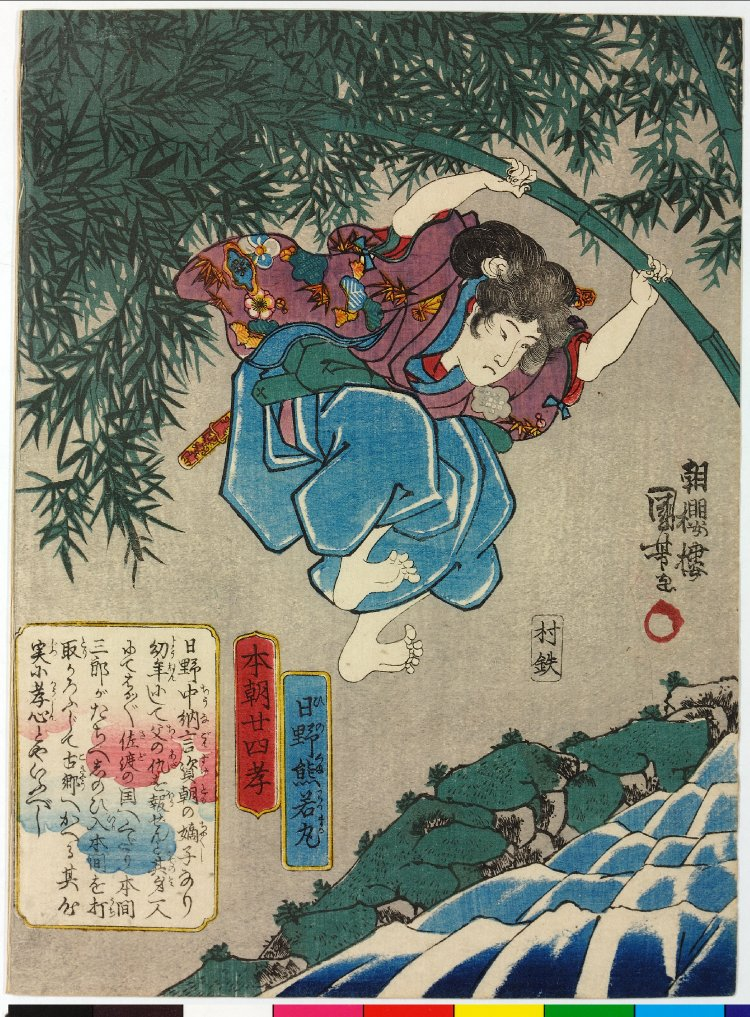
Kumawakamaru escapes his pursuers by swinging across the moat on a bamboo. Woodblock print on paper. Kuniyoshi, 1842–1843.

Many famous people in Japanese history have been associated or identified as ninja, but their status as ninja is difficult to prove and may be the product of later imagination. Rumors surrounding famous warriors, such as Kusunoki Masashige or Minamoto no Yoshitsune sometimes describe them as ninja, but there is little evidence for these claims.

Some well known examples include:

- Kumawaka (the 16th century): a suppa (ninja) who served Obu Toramasa (1504–1565), a vassal of Takeda Shingen.
- Hattori Hanzō (1542–1596): a samurai serving under Tokugawa Ieyasu. His ancestry in Iga province, along with ninjutsu manuals published by his descendants, has led some sources to define him as a ninja.
- Fūma Kotarō (d. 1603): a ninja rumored to have killed Hattori Hanzō, with whom he was supposedly rivals. The fictional weapon Fūma shuriken is named after him.
- Fujibayashi Nagato-no-kami (16th century). His descendants wrote and edited the Bansenshukai.
- Katō Danzō (1503–1569): a famed 16th-century ninja master during the Sengoku period who was also known as "Flying Katō".
- Shimotsuge no Kizaru (16th century): an influential Iga ninja who in 1560 successfully led an attack on Tōichi Castle.

On February 25, 2018, Yamada Yūji, the professor of Mie University and historian Nakanishi Gō announced that they had identified three people who were successful in early modern Ureshino, including the ninja Benkei Musō (弁慶夢想). Musō is thought to be the same person as Denrinbō Raikei (伝林坊頼慶), the Chinese disciple of Marume Nagayoshi.

== In popular culture ==
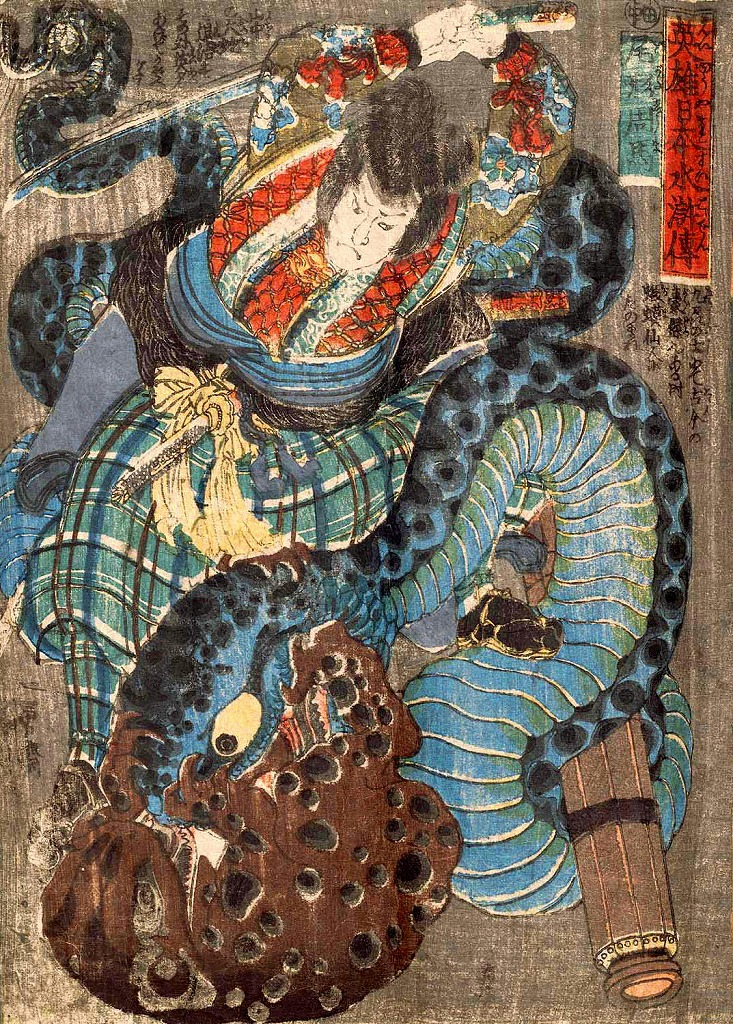
Jiraiya battles a giant python with the help of his summoned toad. Woodblock print on paper. Kuniyoshi, c. 1843.

The image of the ninja entered popular culture in the Edo period, when folktales and plays about ninja were conceived. Stories about the ninja are usually based on historical figures. For instance, many similar tales exist about a daimyō challenging a ninja to prove his worth, usually by stealing his pillow or weapon while he slept. Novels were written about the ninja, such as Jiraiya Gōketsu Monogatari, which was also made into a kabuki play. Fictional figures such as Sarutobi Sasuke would eventually make their way into comics and television, where they have come to enjoy a culture hero status outside their original mediums.

Ninja appear in many forms of Japanese and Western popular media.

=== Costume ===
In films, manga, and other works of fiction, ninjas are commonly depicted wearing black costumes. In reality, however, during peacetime they typically wore work clothes similar to those of farmers, dyed dark indigo. For combat, they are believed to have worn modified yamagi (mountain work clothes) or noragi (farm work clothes). As discussed below, these garments were likely dark brown rather than black, as brown blended more effectively into the darkness at night. Since such clothing was intended for nighttime operations, it would have been conspicuous during the daytime and was therefore not worn in daylight. To carry out infiltration missions, ninjas disguised themselves as Komusō, Buddhist priests, Yamabushi, merchants, Hōkashi (itinerant entertainers), or Sarugaku performers.

== Gallery ==
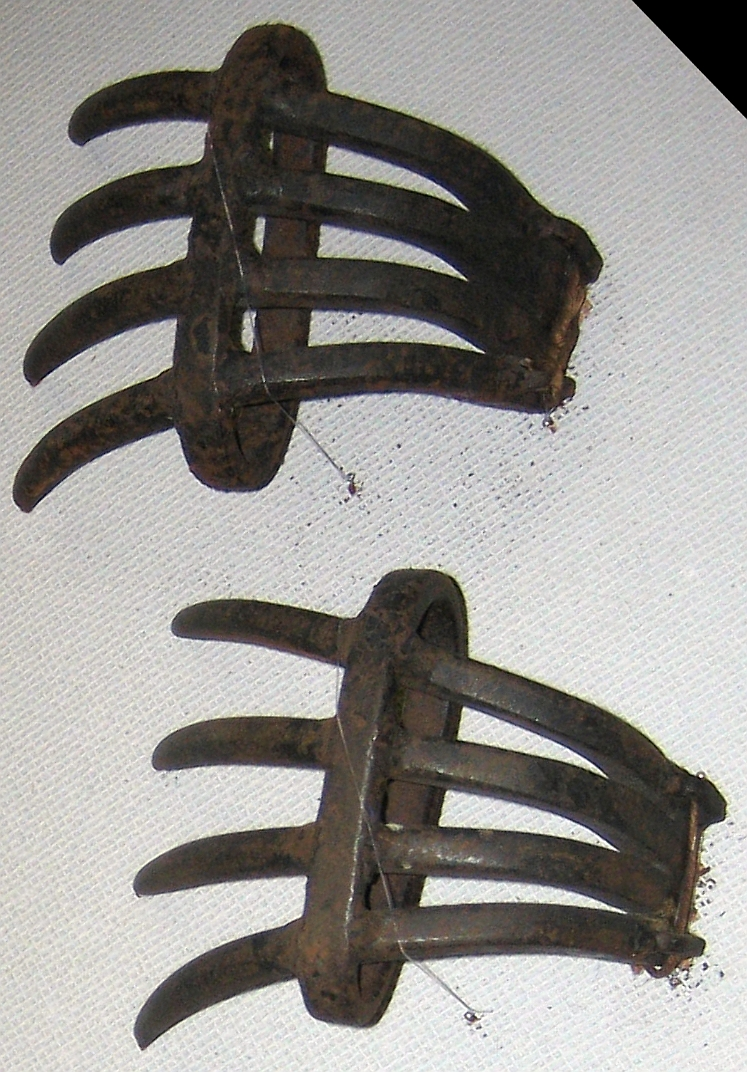
Tekko-kagi, hand claws

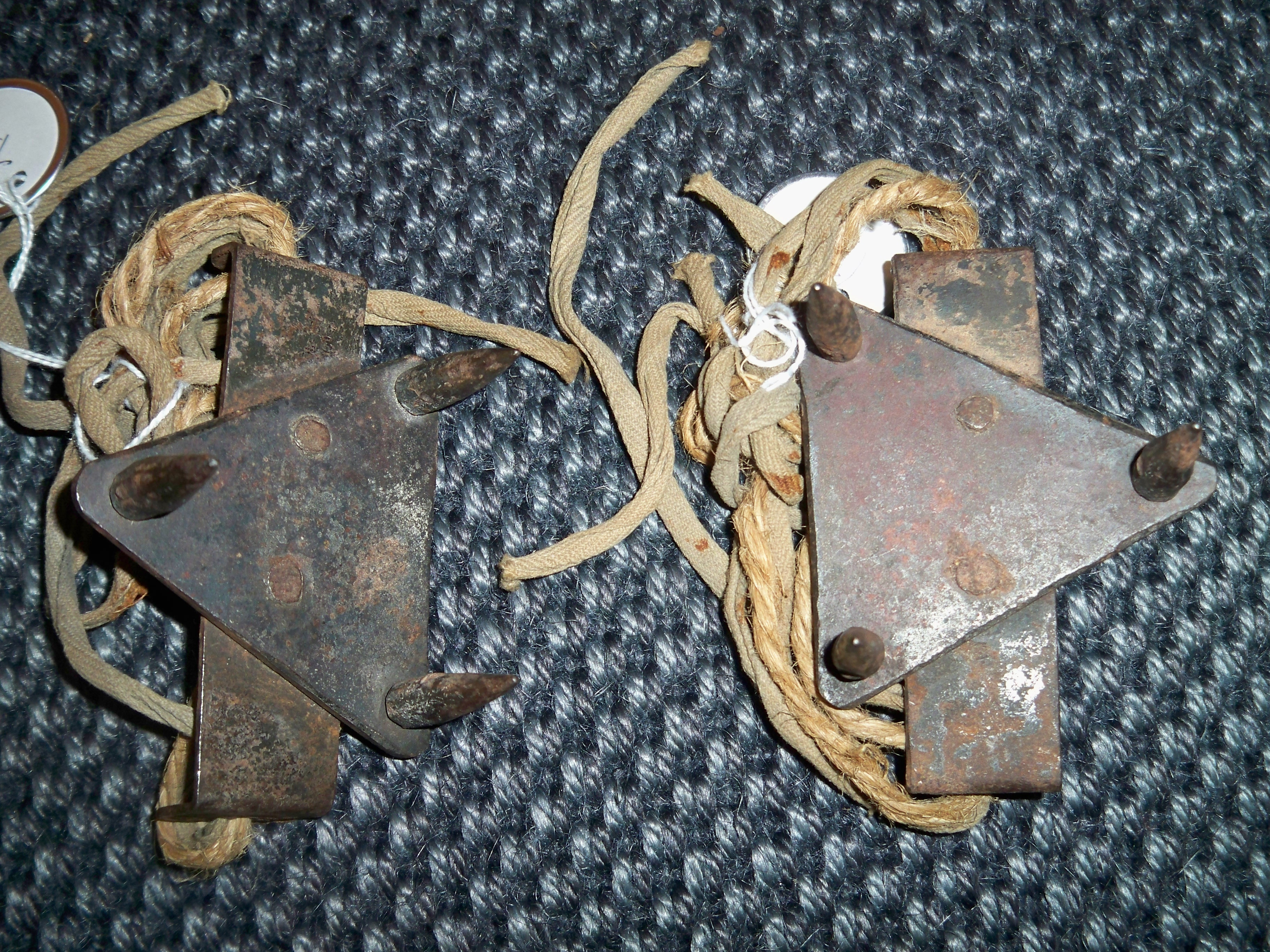
Ashiko, iron climbing cleats

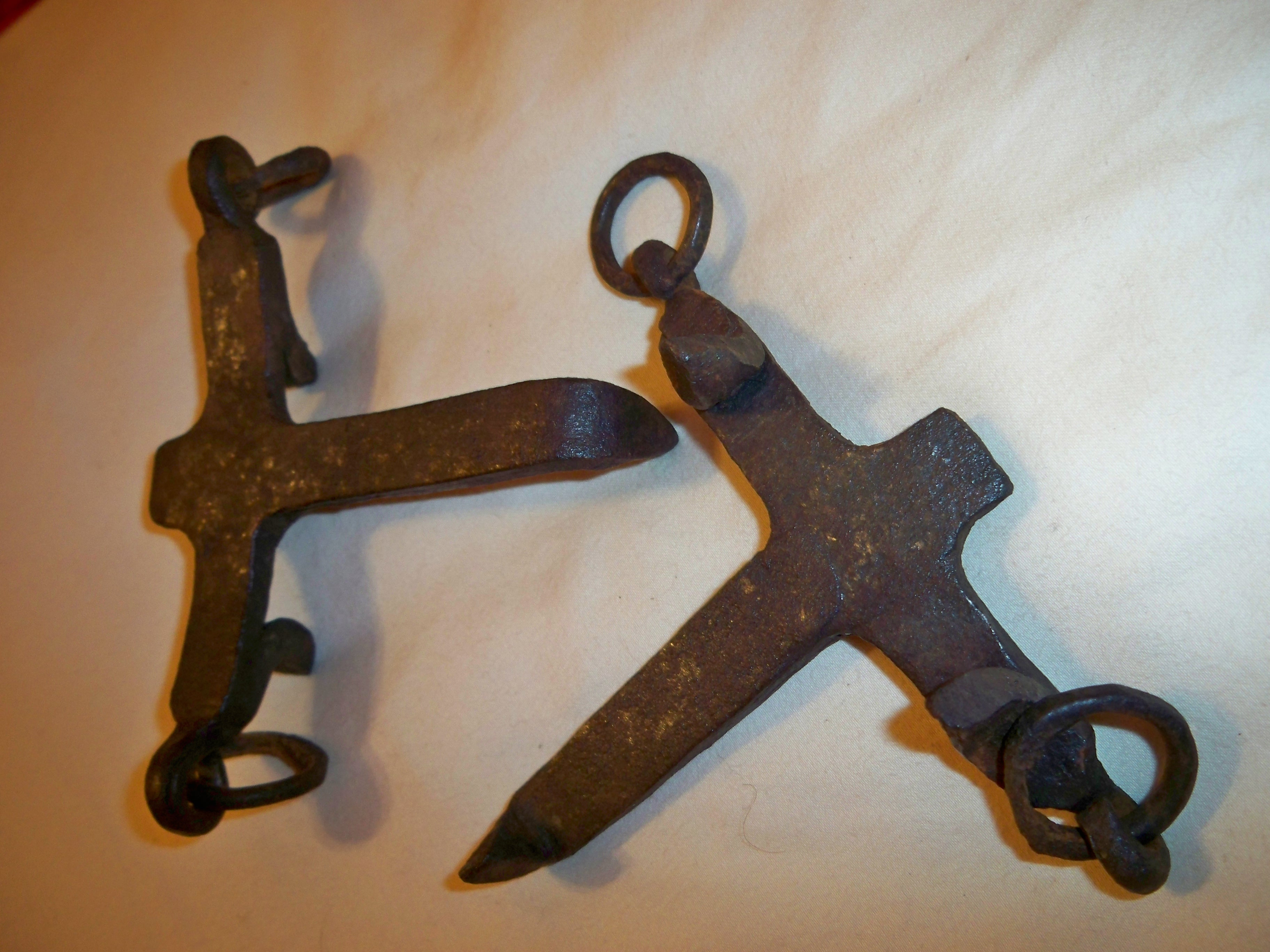
Ashiko, iron climbing cleats

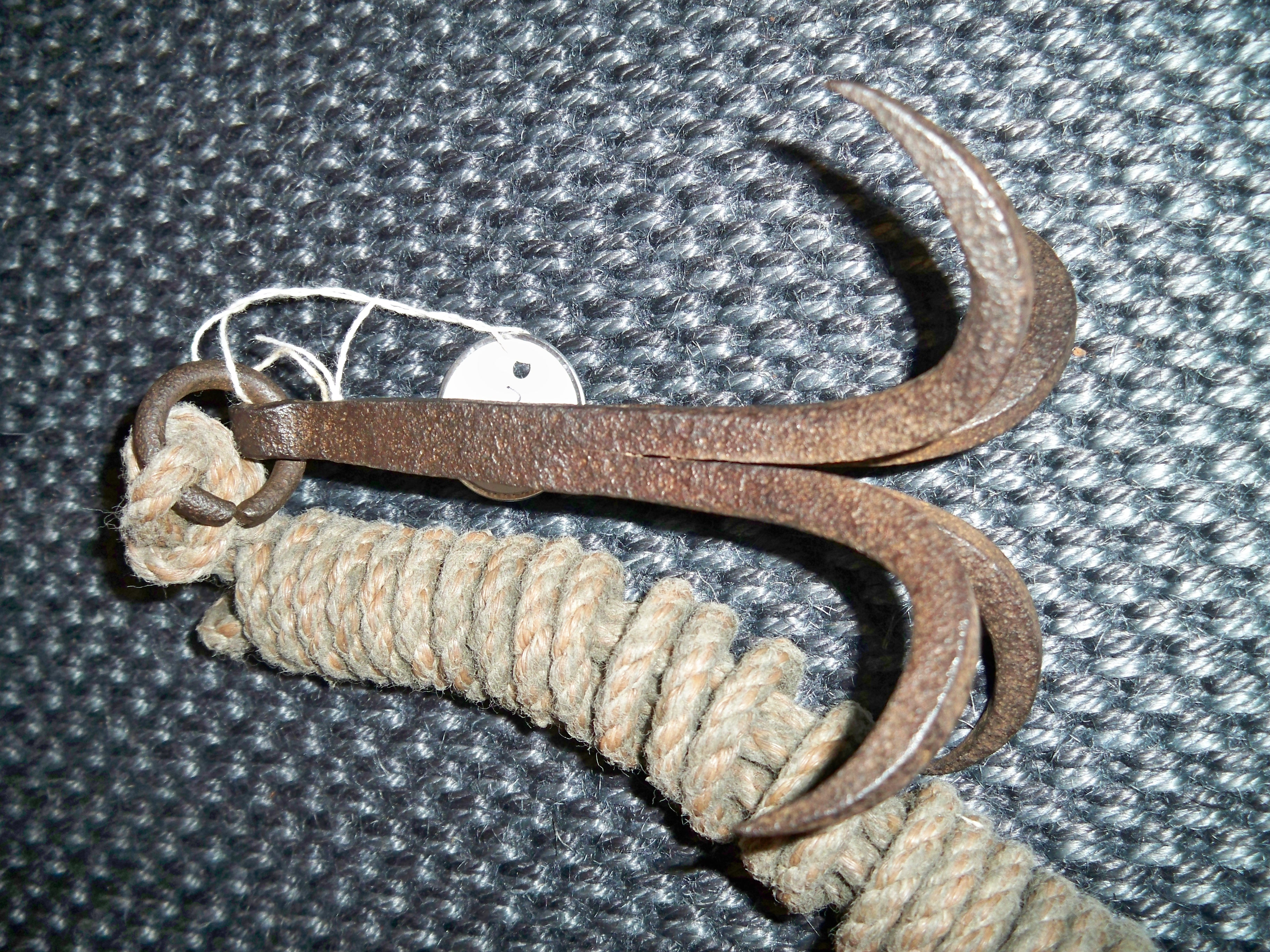
Kaginawa, iron climbing hook

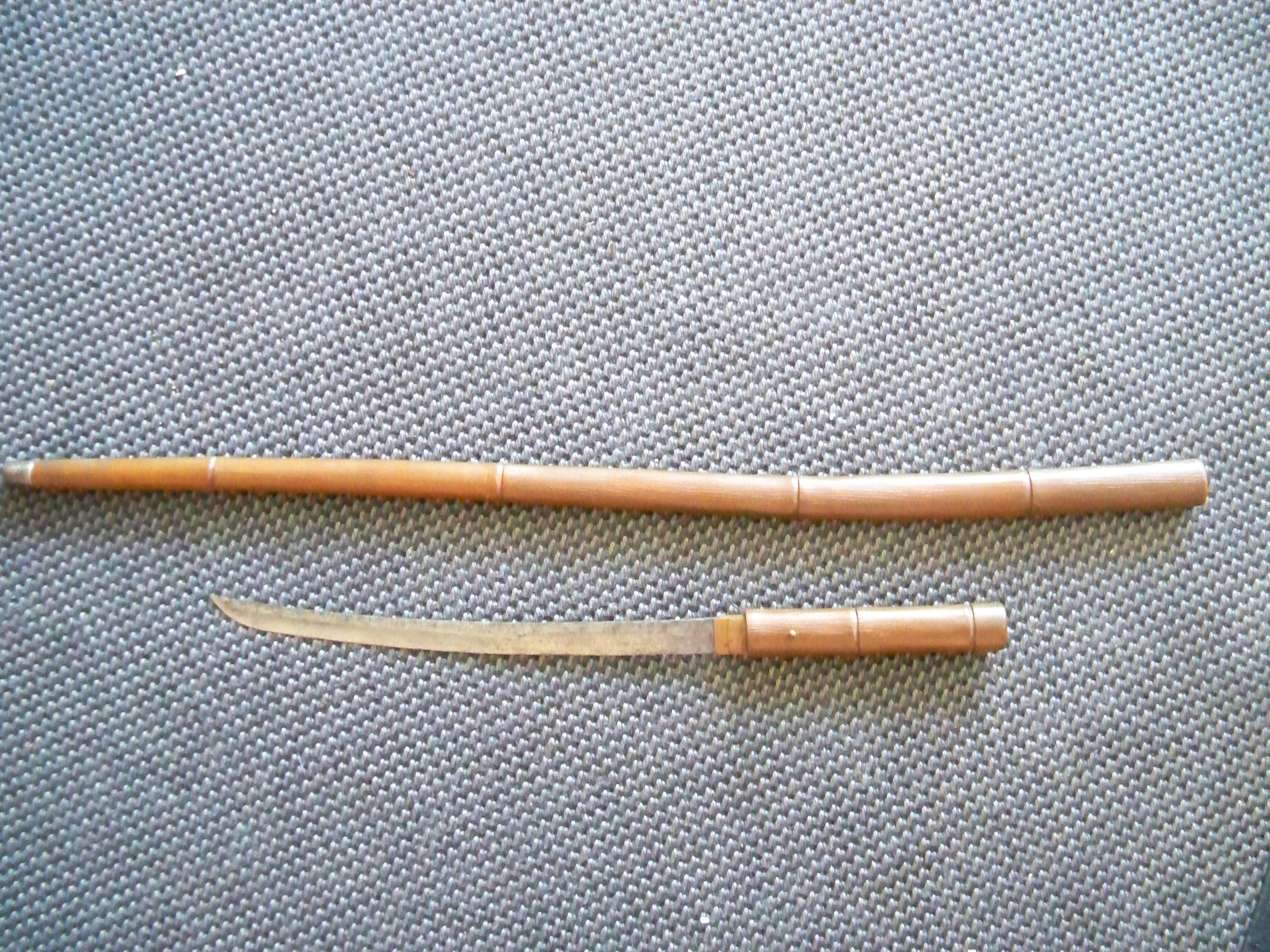
Shikomizue, a cane sword

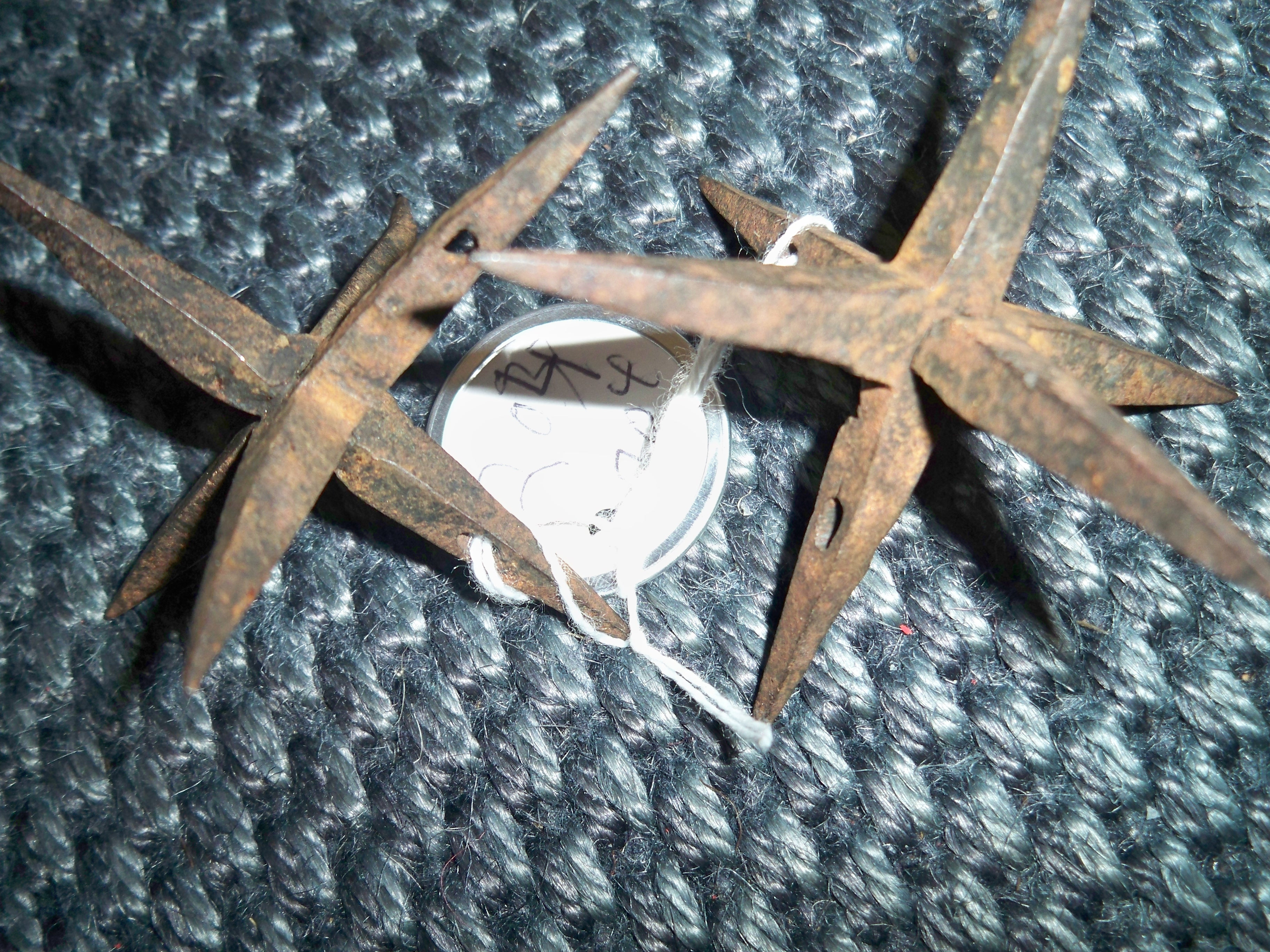
Makibishi, iron caltrops

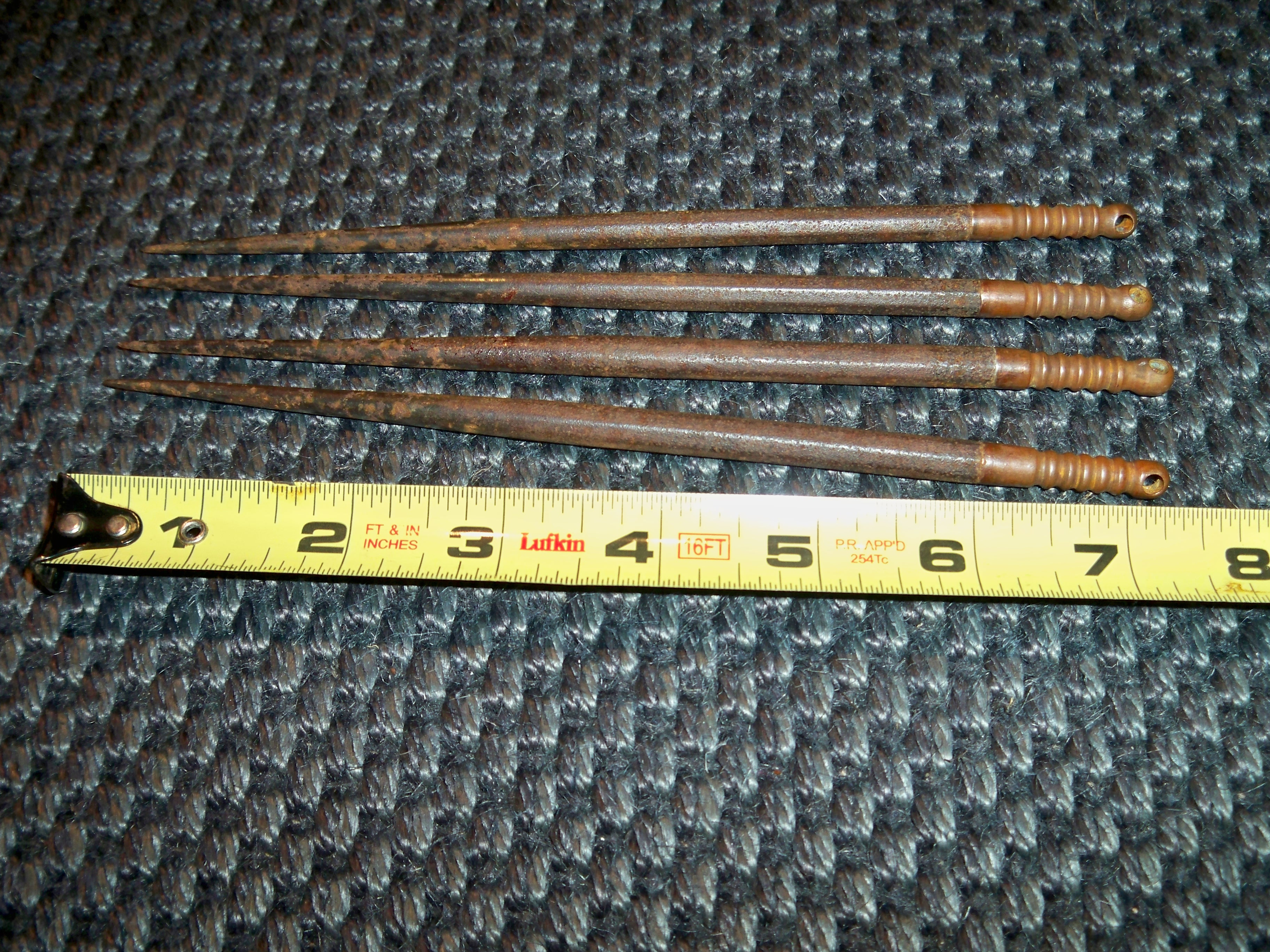
Bo-shuriken, throwing darts

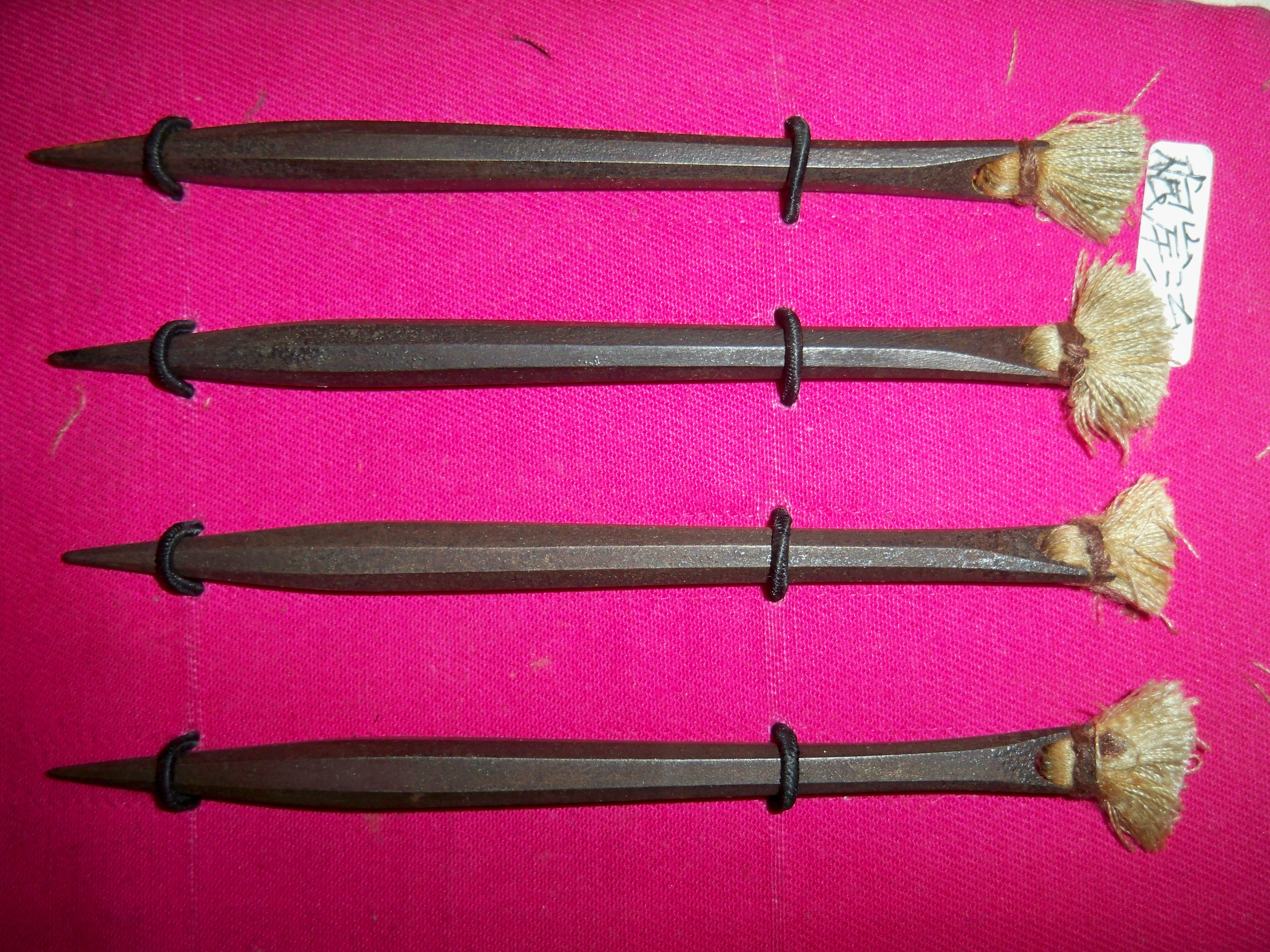
Bo-shuriken, with linen flights

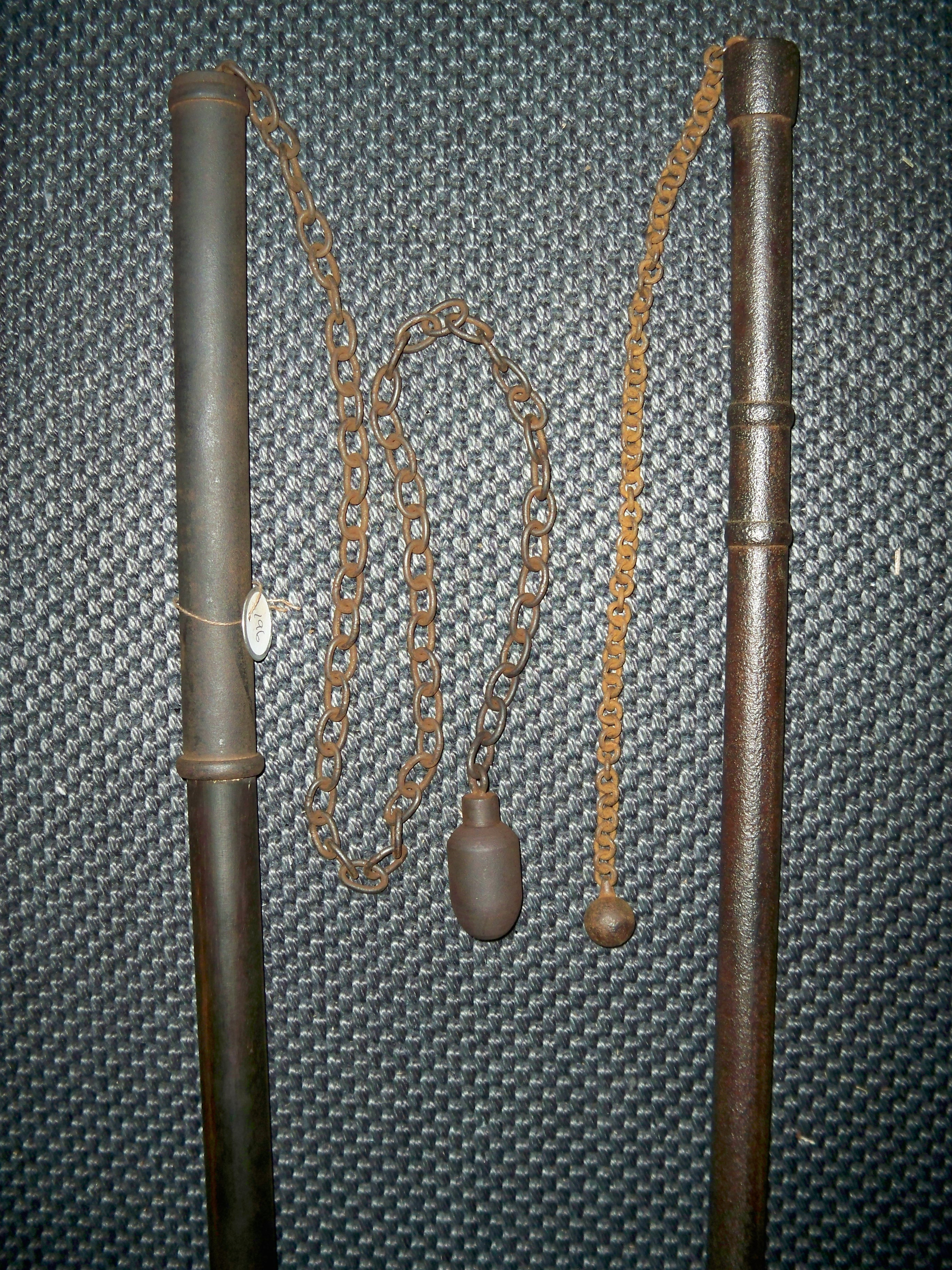
Chigiriki, chain and weight weapons

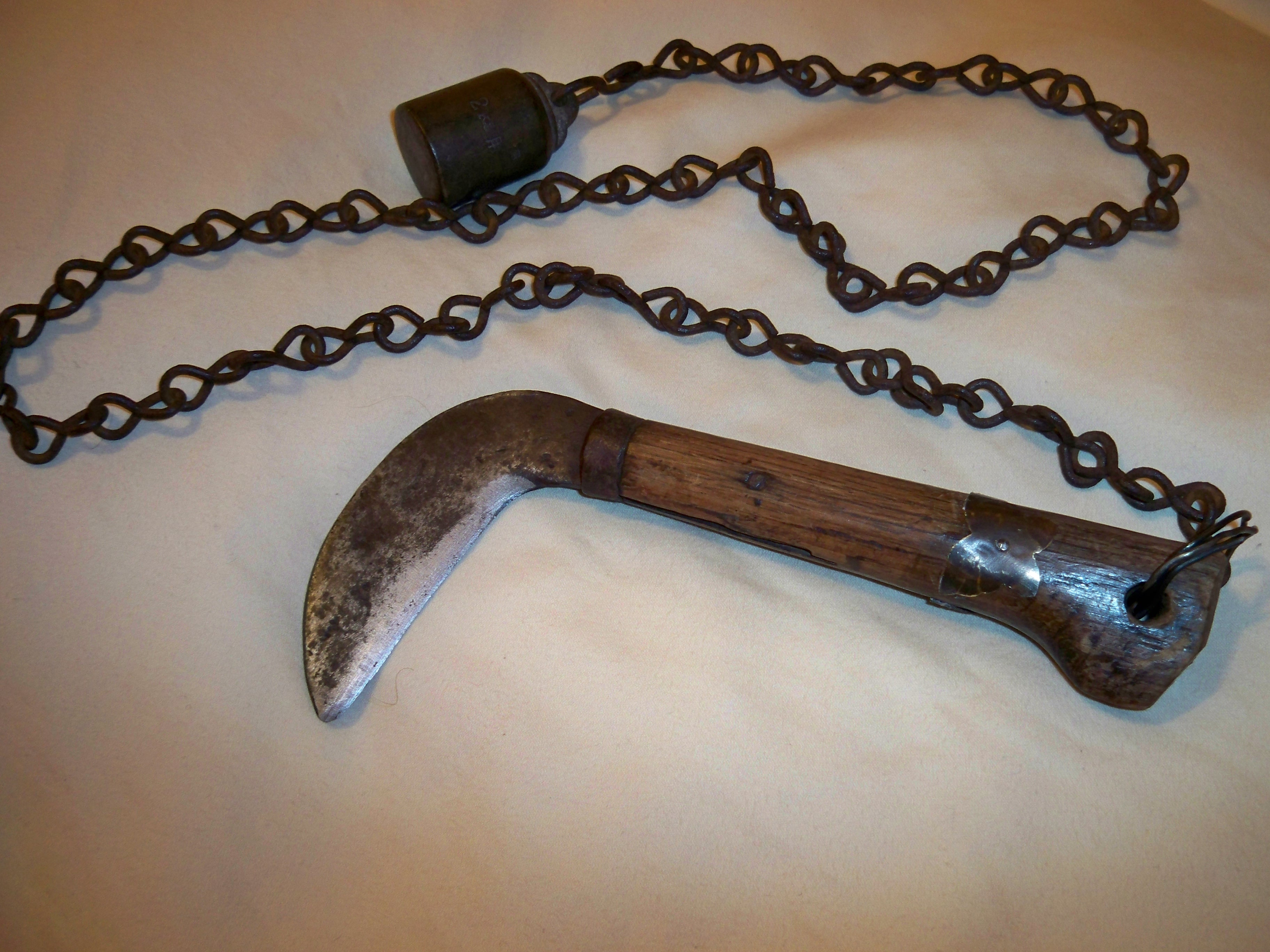
Kusarigama, a chain and sickle

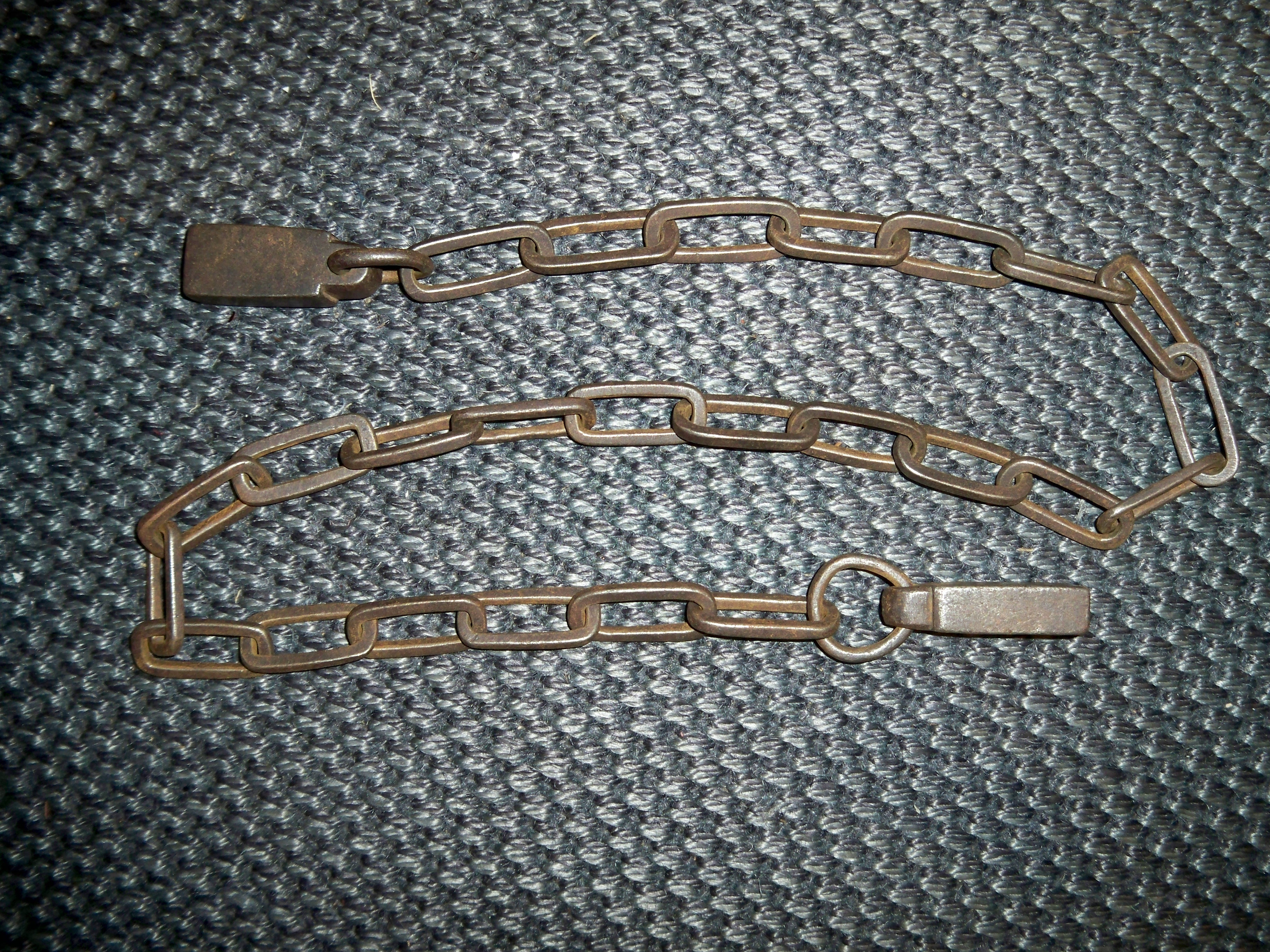
Kusari-fundo, a chain weapon

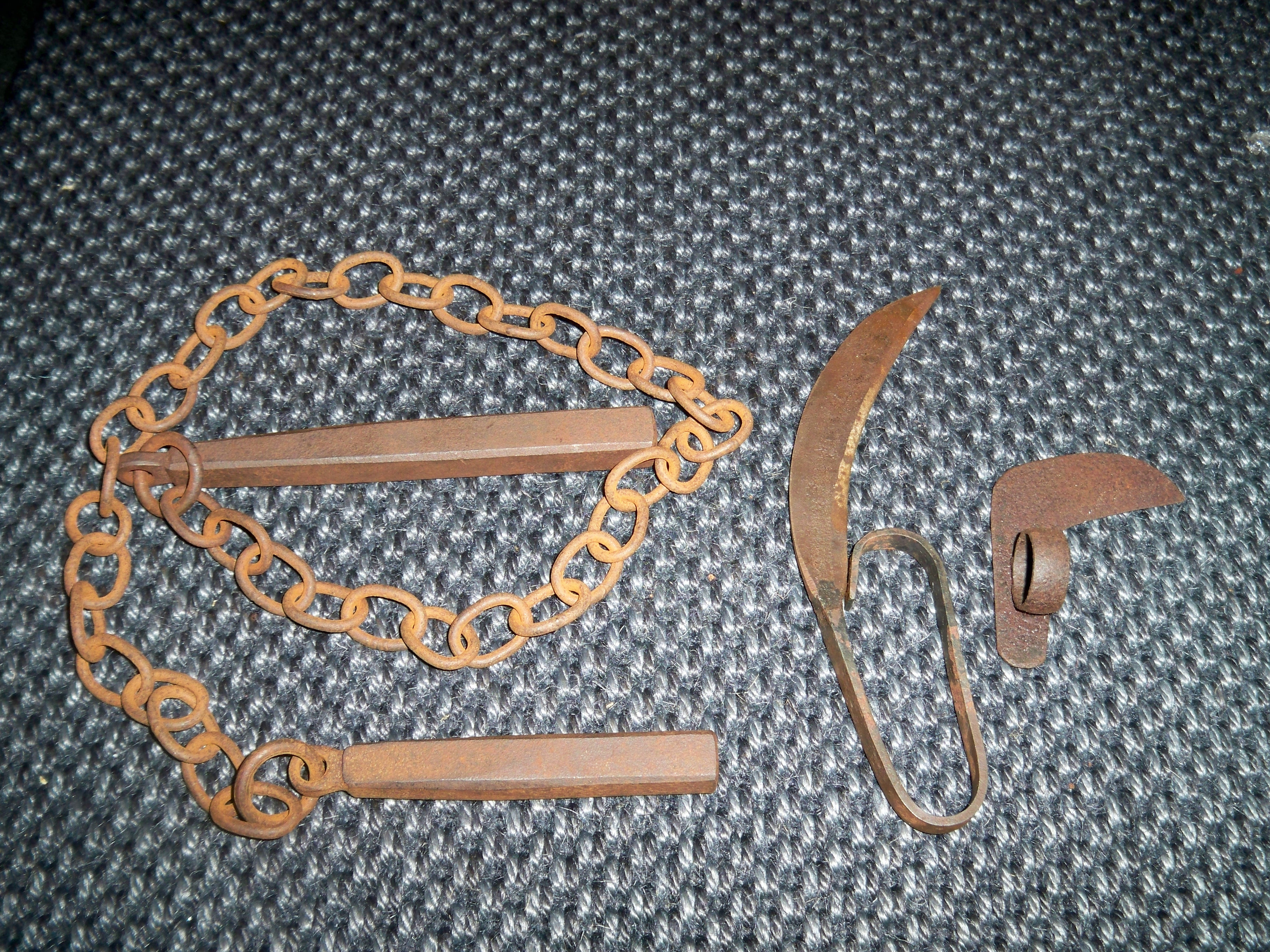
Various concealable weapons

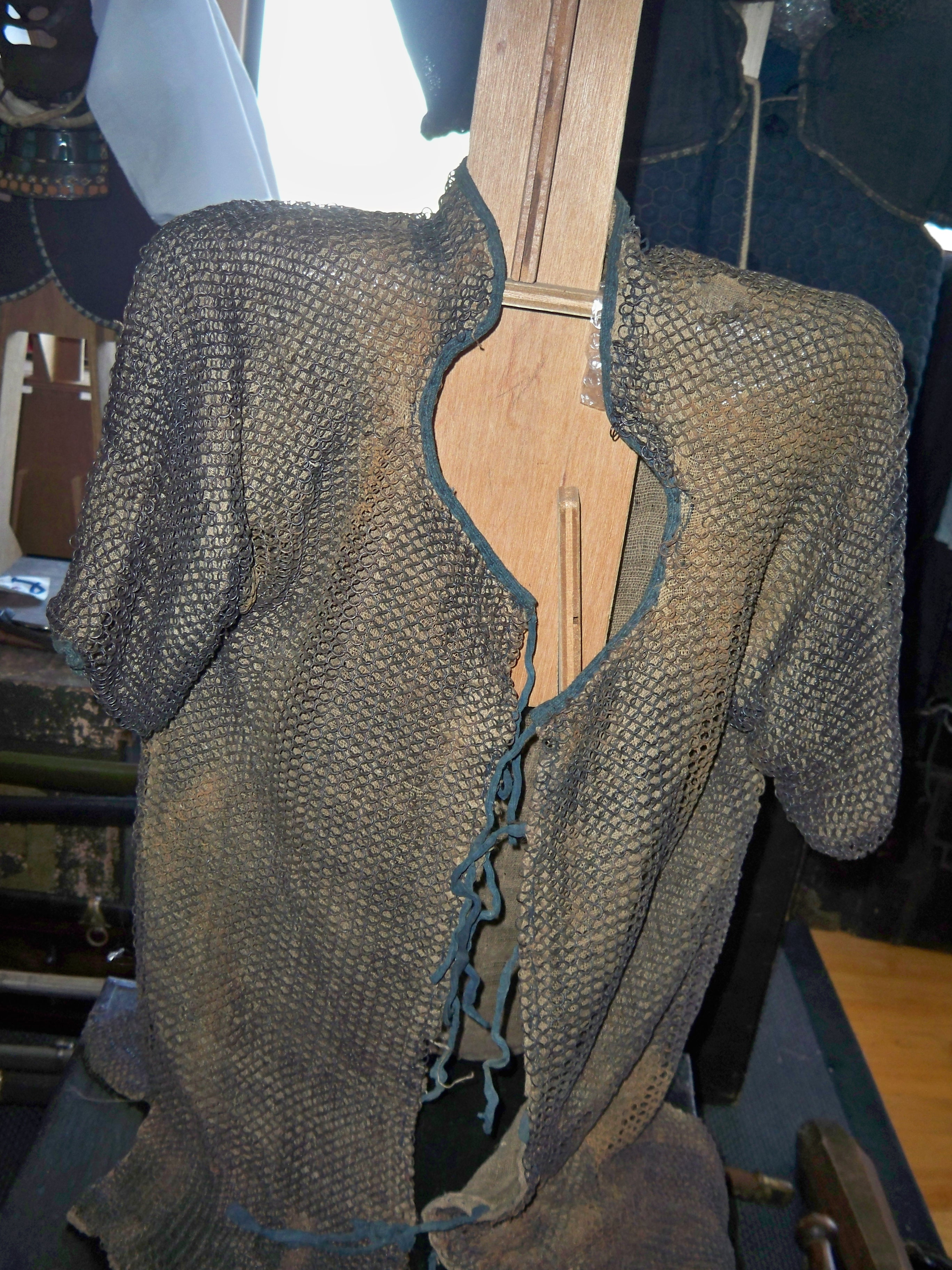
Chain mail shirt (Kusari katabira)

== See also ==
- Khevtuul
- Kunoichi
- Modern schools of ninjutsu
- Ninja Museum of Igaryu
- Order of Musashi Shinobi Samurai
- Pre-modern special forces
