= Mie University =

National university in Tsu, Mie Prefecture, Japan

- 三重大学
- Entrance to Mie University
- Type: Public (National)
- Established: 1949
- President: Yoshihiro Komada
- Administrative staff: 1,740 (2002)
- Students: 7,505 (2002)
- Undergraduates: 6,238 (2002)
- Postgraduates: 1,256 (2002)
- Location: 1577 Kurimamachiya-chō, Tsu, Mie 514-8507, Japan, Tsu, Mie, Japan; 34.746329°N 136.522679°E
- Campus: Urban
- Colors: Forest green, dark blue
- Website: www.mie-u.ac.jp

Mie University (三重大学; Mie Daigaku, abbreviated to 三重大 Miedai) is a national university in Tsu, Mie Prefecture, Japan. As with other national universities, Mie University has been a National University Corporation since April 2004, when state-funded universities were partially privatised. In 2006, it was ranked 250th in the Times Higher Education Supplement list of the world's best universities.

== History ==
Mie University was founded on 31 May 1949 with two faculties: Liberal Arts and Agriculture. These gave way to the establishment's present composition of six faculties: Humanities, Medicine, Education, Bioresources, Engineering and Common Education - the latter dealing with cross-faculty courses such as English language teaching. Its Center for International Exchange promotes international links and issues involving the global community.

The institution is Mie prefecture's only national university, located in the city of Tsu in the Kansai region, within easy reach of Kyoto, Osaka and Nagoya. The campus is situated in the north-east of the city, close to the coast of Ise Bay. Though some students make use of nearby accommodation, larger numbers commute from the larger cities, as well as nearby towns such as Ise, Matsusaka and Toba.

In 2017, Mie University established the world's first research centre about the ninja. A graduate master course opened in 2018. It is located in Iga (now Mie Prefecture). The first graduate of the ninja studies master course was Genichi Mitsuhashi (45 years old) in 2020.

== Organization ==
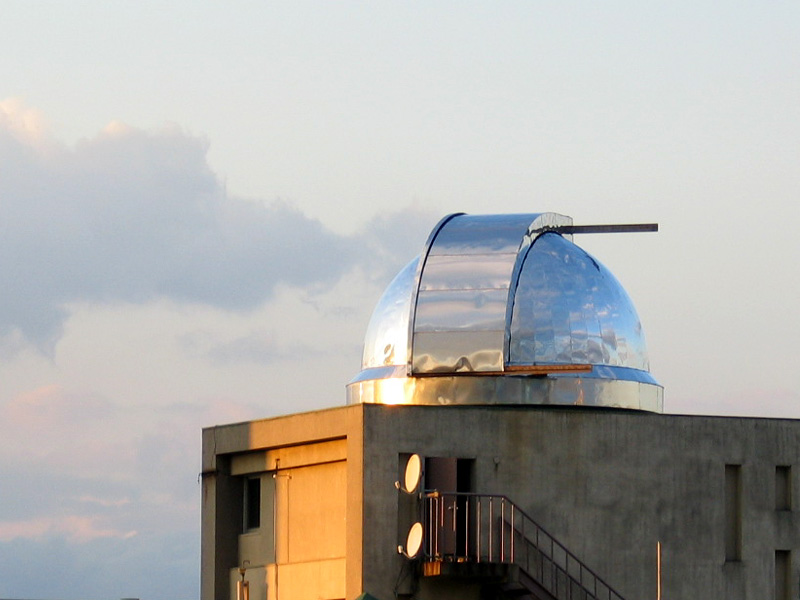
Observatory of the university

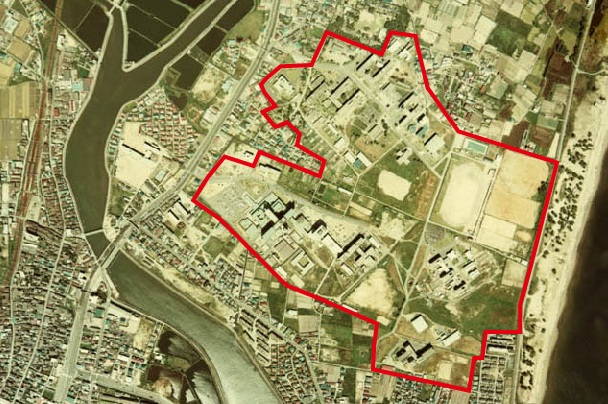
Campus (the area surrounded by red lines) and its surroundings

=== Faculties ===
- Humanities and Social Sciences
- Education
- Medicine
- Engineering
- Bioresources
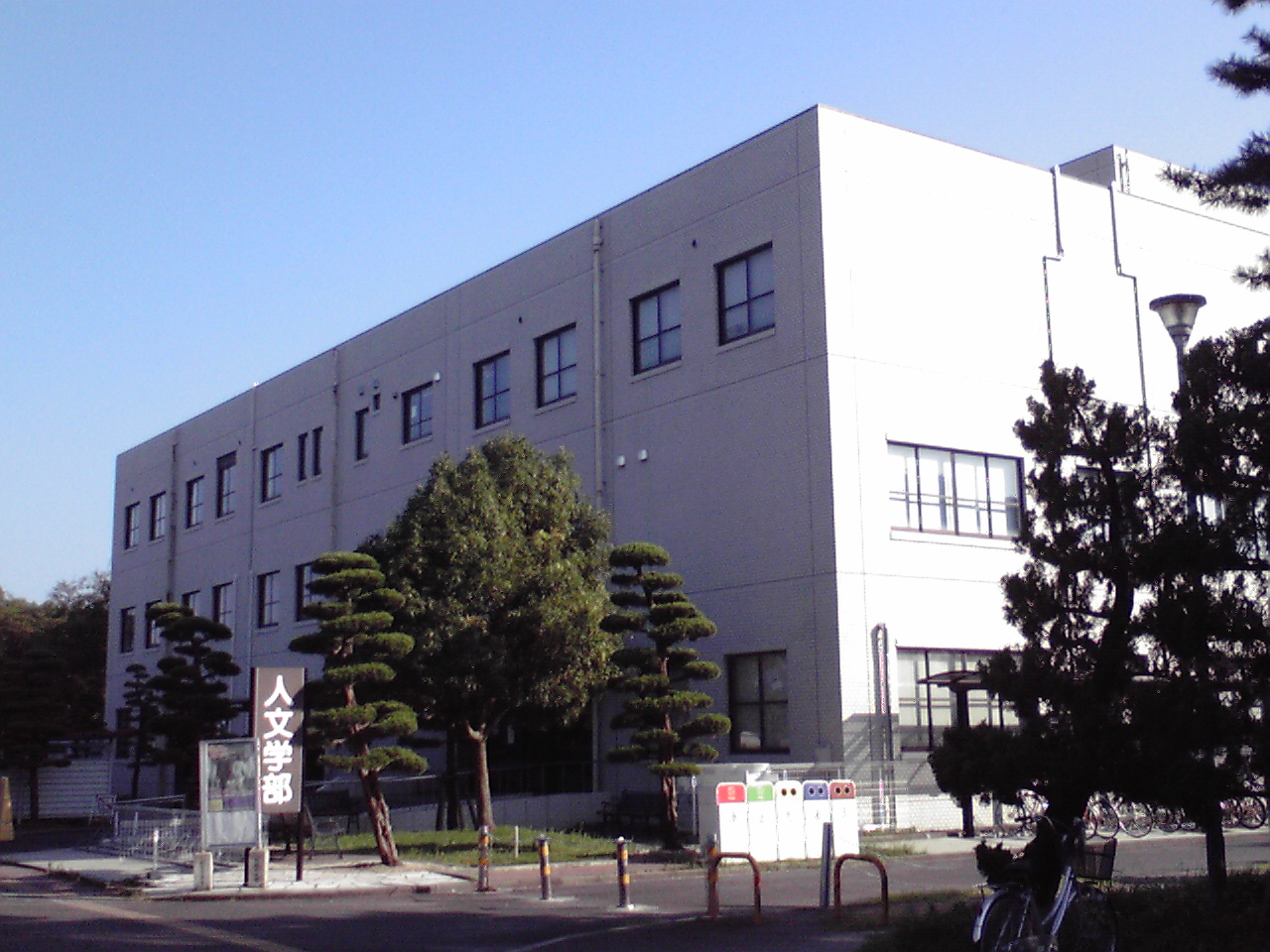
Faculty of Humanities

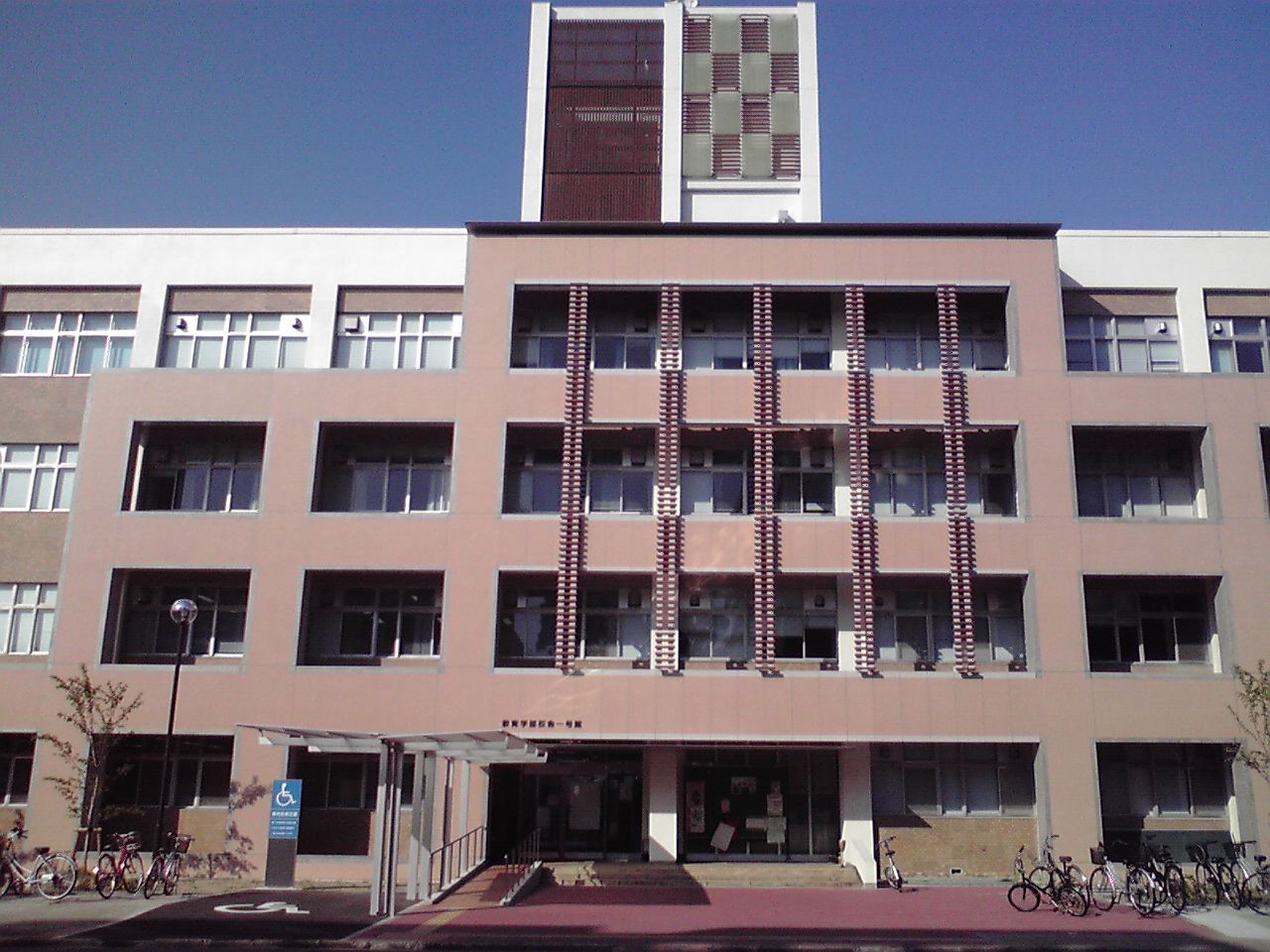
Faculty of Education

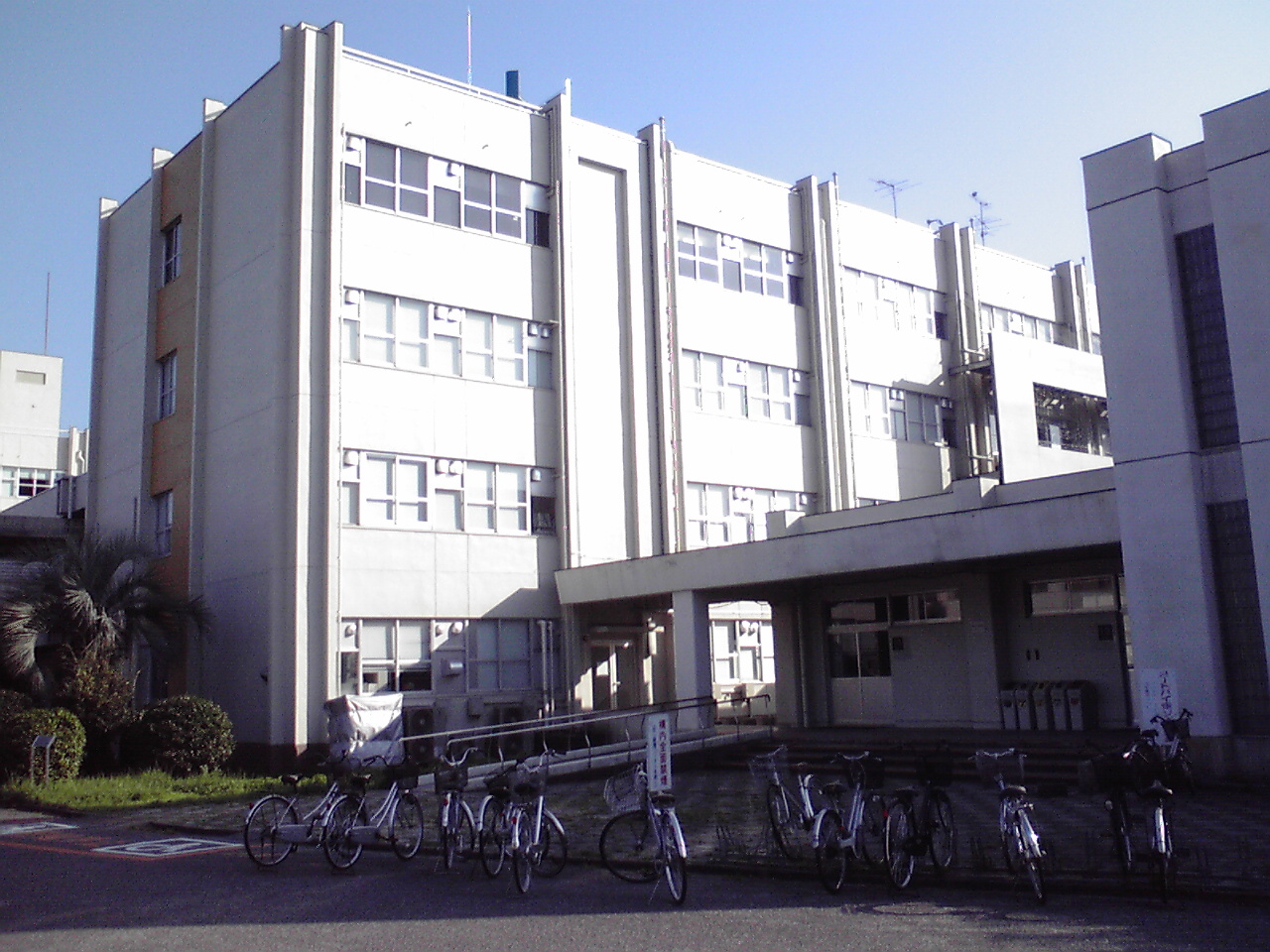
Faculty of Engineering

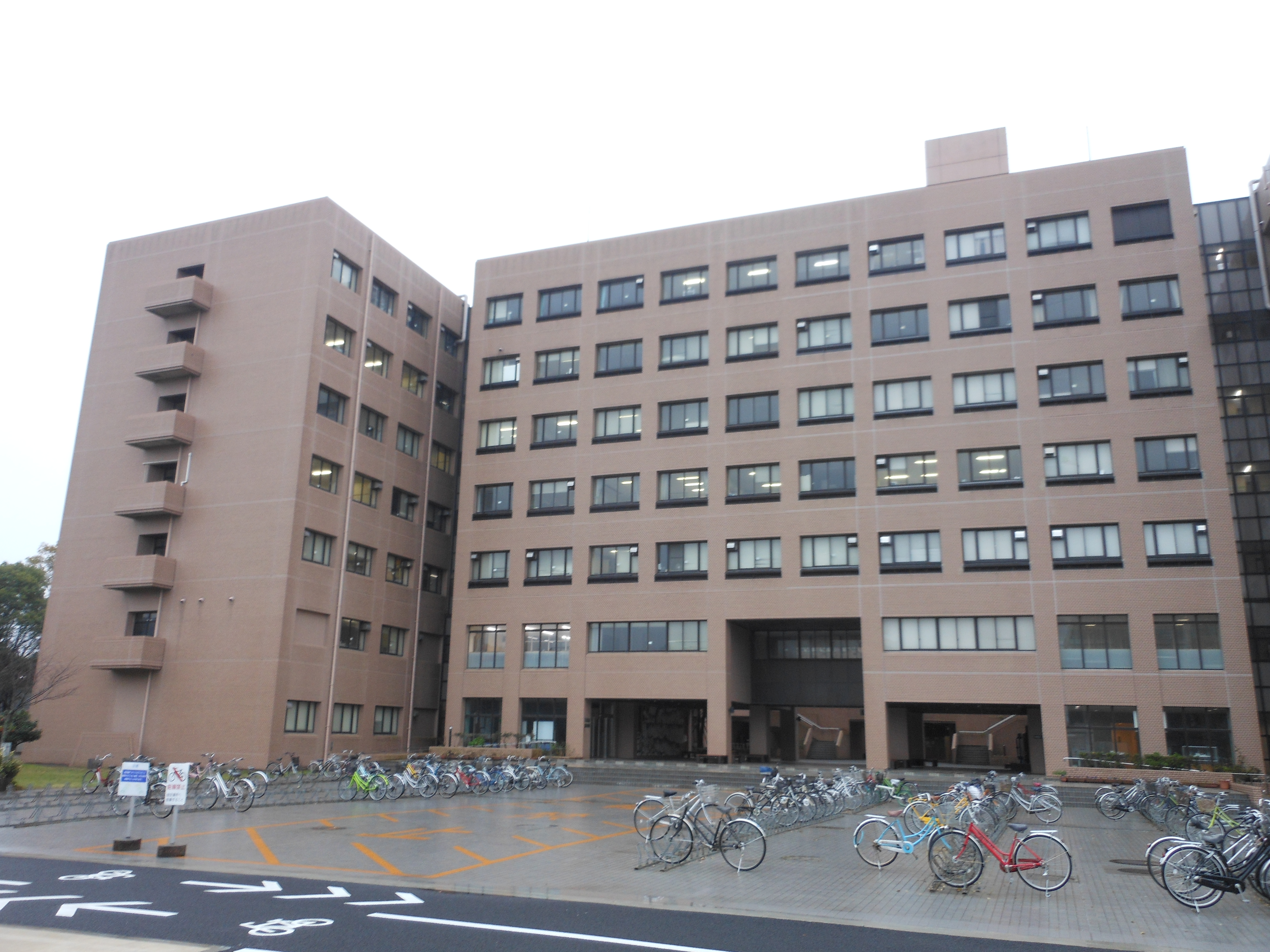
Faculty of Bioresources

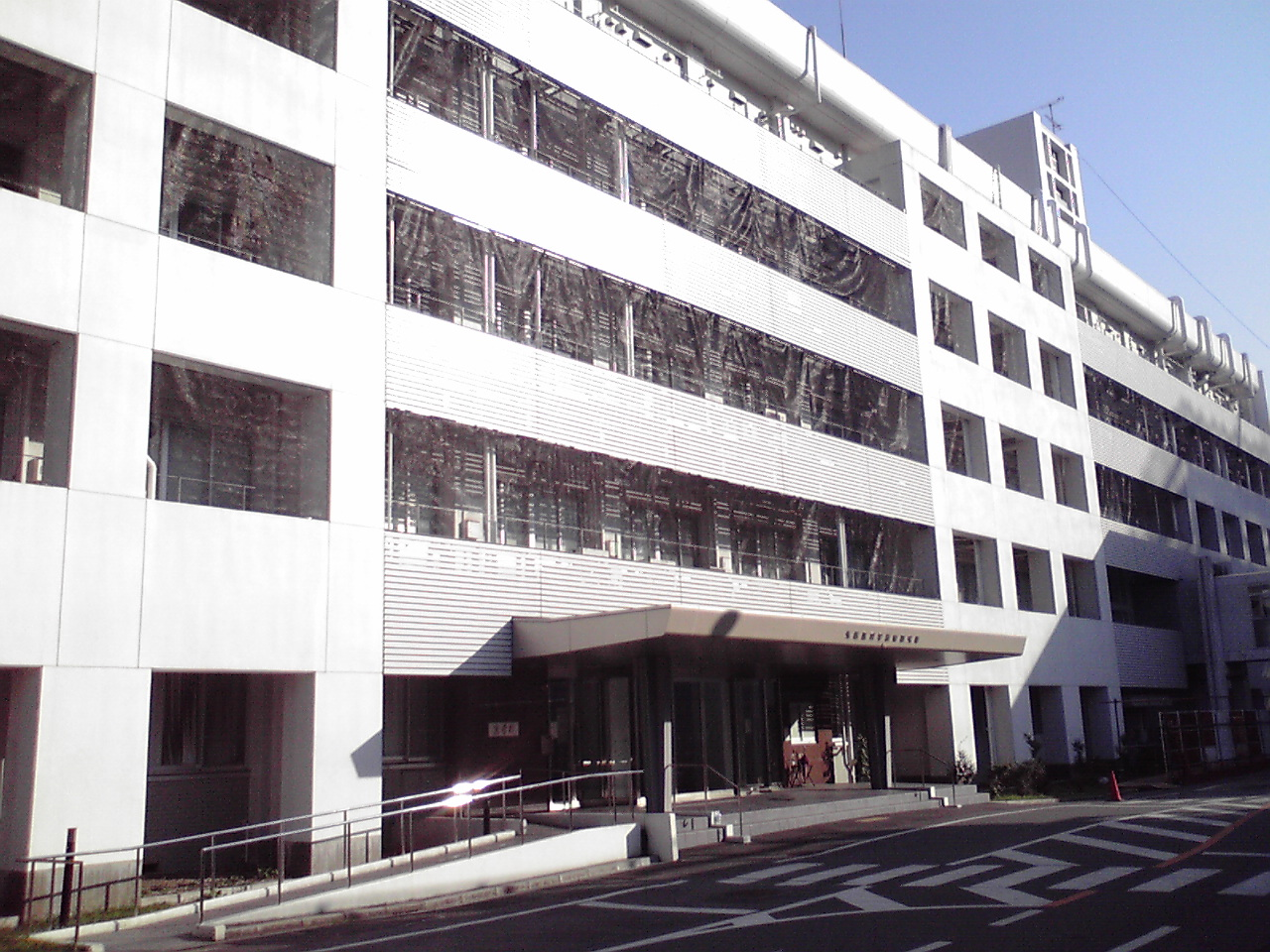
Faculty of medicine
