= Hasetsukabe no Koharumaru =

Hasetsukabe no Koharumaru (丈部 子春丸) (died 938) was a boy spy of Heian period Japan. He is known from the 10th century military chronicle Shōmonki. Recruited to spy against his lord, the rebel Taira no Masakado, he was ultimately discovered and killed.

== Enlistment ==
According to the Shōmonki, Masakado was embroiled in a bitter struggle with one of his uncles, Taira no Yoshikane. After suffering several defeats at Yoshikane's hands, Masakado retaliated with his own troops, forcing Yoshikane into hiding. It was at this time that the uncle, Yoshikane, noticed the young Koharumaru, who was working as a messenger for Masakado, and who frequented the area near Yoshikane's home. Yoshikane summoned Koharumaru, and bribed the boy with "mounds of rice", clothing, and the prospect of being given a better position as a mounted retainer. In exchange, Yoshikane asked for his cooperation in "devising a scheme to destroy Masakado", a proposal Koharumaru accepted.

== Assignment ==
Koharumaru returned to his home, along with a farmhand Yoshikane had sent with him. Disguised as charcoal carriers, the two spied on Masakado's residence, collecting information on its armory, stable, gates, and Masakado's sleeping quarters before returning to Yoshikane. Having received this information, Yoshikane led his forces against Masakado's estate in a nighttime raid. However, their movement was picked up by one of Masakado's sentries, who warned his master beforehand. Prepared, Masakado led a successful counterattack and routed Yoshikane's troops.

== Death ==
Koharumaru, hearing of their defeat, quickly went on the run. However, it was not two weeks until he was captured by Masakado, and beheaded for his deeds.

== See also ==
- Taira no Masakado
- Shōmonki
