= List of Record of Ragnarok characters =

This is a list of characters of the manga series Record of Ragnarok.

== Valkyries ==
Brunhilde (ブリュンヒルデ, Buryunhirude)
Voiced by: Miyuki Sawashiro (Japanese); Laura Post (English)
The first and eldest of the 13 Valkyrie Sisters and their leader, she convinces the gods to hold the Ragnarok. She despises the gods and takes advantage of the situation to enact her revenge upon them.
Göll (ゲル, Geru)
Voiced by: Tomoyo Kurosawa (Japanese); Anairis Quinones (English)
The thirteenth and youngest of the 13 Valkyrie Sisters.
Randgriz (ランドグリーズ, Randogurīzu)
Voiced by: Aya Kawakami (Japanese); Kayleigh McKee (English)
The fourth of the 13 Valkyrie Sisters. She performed a Völundr with Lü Bu in round 1, turning into the "Sky Piercer", a halberd that had the ability to break through any kind of 'defense' on contact.
Reginleif (レギンレイヴ, Reginreivu)
Voiced by: Rina Kawaguchi^{Ep. 6 credits} (Japanese); Artemis Snow^{Ep. 6 credits} (English)
The seventh of the 13 Valkyrie Sisters. She performed a Völundr with Adam in round 2, turning into a knuckleduster.
Hrist (フリスト, Furisuto)
Voiced by: Yu Kobayashi^{Ep. 8 credits} (Japanese); Mela Lee^{Ep. 8 credits} (English)
The second of the 13 Valkyrie Sisters. She performed a Völundr with Kojiro Sasaki in round 3, turning into the "Monohoshizao", an ōdachi. Due to Hrist's bipolar personality, the sword was able to reform itself into a daishō set of katana after being broken in half.
Hlökk (フレック, Furekku)
Voiced by: Honoka Inoue (Japanese); Kari Wahlgren^{Ep. 15 credits} (English)
The eleventh of the 13 Valkyrie Sisters. She performed a forced Völundr with Jack the Ripper in round 4, turning into a pair of gloves that could turn anything into a divine weapon.
Thrud (スルーズ, Surūzu)
Voiced by: Akira Miki (Japanese); Marin Miller^{Ep. 18 credits} (English)
The third of the 13 Valkyrie Sisters. She performed a Völundr with Raiden Tameemon in round 5, turning into the "Mawashi of Flesh and Bone", a special mawashi that allowed Raiden to completely manipulate his own muscles.
Alvitr (アルヴィト, Aruvito)
Voiced by: Shiori Mikami^{Ep. 29 credits} (Japanese); Christina Costello^{Ep. 29 credits} (English)
The tenth of the 13 Valkyrie Sisters. She performed a Völundr with Qin Shi Huang in round 7, turning into a pair of spaulders, known as the "Shenluo Kaixiu" or "Almighty Spaulders", and later reformed into a sword known as the "Shi Huang Goujian Sword".
Göndul (ゴンドゥル, Gonduru)
Voiced by: Misako Tomioka^{Ep. 37 credits} (Japanese); Kayleigh McKee^{Ep. 37 credits} (English)
The ninth of the 13 Valkyrie Sisters. She performed a Völundr with Nikola Tesla in round 8, turning into materials that allowed Tesla to complete his special set of armour, known as the "Super Automaton β".
Geirölul (ゲイレルル, Geireruru)
Voiced by: Mai Todo^{Ep. 39 credits} (Japanese); Kira Buckland^{Ep. 39 credits} (English)
The fifth of the 13 Valkyrie Sisters. She performed a Völundr with Leonidas in round 9, turning into an aspis shield that could change its form to adapt different kind of fighting situations.
Skalmöld (スカルモルド, Sukarumorudo)
The sixth of the 13 Valkyrie Sisters. She performed a Völundr with Soji Okita in round 10, turning into a katana what held the power to bring out Okita's maximal potential in swordsmanship.
Radgridr (ラズグリーズル, Razugurīzuru)
The eighth of the 13 Valkyrie Sisters. She performed a Völundr with Simo Häyhä in round 11, turning into a M/28-30 rifle.
Skeggjöld (スケッギヨルド, Sukeggyorudo)
The twelfth of the 13 Valkyrie Sisters. She performed a Völundr with Sakata Kintoki in round 12, turning into an axe.

== Einherjar (Humanity's Fighters) ==
The einherjar are 13 human warriors chosen personally by Brunhilde to fight in Ragnarök, later being joined by Buddha, leaving the einherjar with one extra fighter.

Lü Bu (呂布奉先, Ryofu Hōsen)
Voiced by: Tomokazu Seki (Japanese); Kaiji Tang (English)
A military general and warlord who lived during the late Eastern Han dynasty of Imperial China and humanity's representative for the first match, fighting and losing against Thor. His weapon is the Sky Piercer, a halberd granted by the valkyrie Randgriz, whose special ability allows Lu Bu to break any armor.
Adam (アダム, Adamu)
Voiced by: Soma Saito (Japanese); Jonah Scott (English)
The progenitor of all humanity who fights and loses against Zeus in the second match. Designed in the image of a god, Adam can perfectly replicate any move and technique he lays his eyes upon. His weapon is a knuckleduster, granted by the valkyrie Reginleif. Despite losing, his effort inspires the rest of humanity to believe in their chances.
Kojiro Sasaki (佐々木 小次郎, Sasaki Kojirō)
Voiced by: Kazuhiro Yamaji (Japanese); Keone Young^{Ep. 8 credits} (English)
A famous Japanese swordsman who fights and wins in the third match against Poseidon. His weapon is the Monohoshizao, a two-handed nodachi granted by the valkyrie Hrist, whose special ability allowed her to transform into two weapons after the Monohoshizao was shattered.
Jack the Ripper (ジャック・ザ・リッパー, Jakku za Rippā)
Voiced by: Tomokazu Sugita (Japanese); Jeff Leach^{Ep. 12 credits}, David Errigo Jr. (young) (English)
An infamous British serial killer from the late 19th century who fights and wins in the fourth match against Heracles. He has a special right eye that allows him to see other people's emotions as colors, which eventually made him start killing, because he found the color of the fear of death beautiful. He wears a pair of gloves granted by the valkyrie Hlökk, whose special ability allows Jack the Ripper to turn anything his gloves touch into a divine weapon.
Raiden Tameemon (雷電爲右エ門)
Voiced by: Subaru Kimura (Japanese); Michael Schwalbe^{Ep. 18 credits} (English)
The highest-rated Japanese sumo wrestler from the 19th century who fights and loses in the fifth match against Shiva. He wears a mawashi granted by the valkyrie Thrud, which gives him complete control over his body's muscles.
Buddha (釈迦, Shaka)
Voiced by: Yuichi Nakamura (Japanese); Maaz Ali^{Ep. 17 credits} (English)
A former human who founded Buddhism, known as "The Enlightened One". Despite having attained godhood, Buddha decides to represent and win for humanity in the sixth match, much to the ire of the other gods. He initially wields the Six Realms Staff, an oversized praying wheel that can assume six different forms according to his current emotional state. During his fight with Hajun, Buddha is granted by Zerofuku's soul to use Great Nirvana Sword Zero.
Qin Shi Huang (秦始皇, Shikōtei)
Voiced by: Kaito Ishikawa^{Ep. 27 credits} (Japanese); Cory Yee^{Ep. 27 credits} (English)
The founder of the Qin dynasty and the first emperor to unify China, in the 3rd century BC, who fights and wins against Hades in the seventh match. His weapons are the Allmighty Spaulders, granted by the valkyrie Alvitr. His spaulders later change into the Shi Huang Goujian Sword. In addition to his weapons, Qin is also a skilled martial artist. Qin's eyes can also see specific "star" points in a person's body, allowing him to strike at specific areas and disrupt attack flows. However, they also cause him to feel any pain he sees.
Nikola Tesla (ニコラ・テスラ, Nikora Tesura)
Voiced by: Makoto Furukawa^{Ep. 34 credits} (Japanese); John Patneaude^{Ep. 34 credits} (English)
A Serbian-American inventor from the 20th century, who fights and loses in the eighth match against Beelzebub. His weapon is the "Super Automaton β", a powered exoskeleton armor granted by the valkyrie Göndul.
Leonidas (レオニダス, Reonidasu)
Voiced by: Hiroshi Shirokuma^{Ep. 39 credits} (Japanese); David Hayter^{Ep. 39 credits} (English)
A Spartan king from the 5th century BC, famous for his instrumental role at the Battle of Thermopylae, who fights and loses in the ninth match against Apollo. His weapon is an aspis shield capable of assuming different forms for adaptation, granted by the Valkyrie Geirölul.
Soji Okita (沖田 総司, Okita Sōji)
Voiced by: Tsubasa Yonaga (Japanese); Mike Haimoto, Alejandro Saab (episode 23 onwards) (English)
The captain of the Shinsengumi, a special police force from 19th century Japan, who fights and wins in the tenth match against Susano'o no Mikoto. His weapon is a katana that is able to bring out all the potential he had, granted by the valkyrie Skalmöld.
Simo Häyhä (シモ・ヘイヘ, Shimo Heihe)
A Finnish sniper and war veteran from the 20th century, recognized as the deadliest marksman in history, who fights and wins the eleventh match against Loki. His weapon is a M/28-30 rifle granted by the valkyrie Radgridr. Simo has the power to turn his organs into powerful god-slaying bullets with different abilities.
Sakata Kintoki (坂田 金時, Sakata no Kintoki)
Voiced by: Shunsuke Takeuchi^{Ep. 33 credits} (Japanese); Michael Allan Schneider^{Ep. 33 credits} (English)
A Japanese folk hero from the Heian period, who fights in the twelfth match against Odin. His weapon is an axe granted by the valkyrie Skeggjöld.
Michel de Nostredame (ミシェル・ノストラダムス, Misheru Nosutoradamusu)
Voiced by: Shun Horie^{Ep. 28 credits} (Japanese); Kieran Regan^{Ep. 28 credits} (English)
A French astrologer, physician and reputed seer from the 16th century, who is set to fight in a future match of the Ragnarok. He is also the only human in history to be condemned to Tartarus, after destroying the gate connecting heaven and hell, the Bifröst.
Grigori Rasputin (グリゴリー・ラスプーチン, Gurigorī Rasupūchin)
A Russian mystic and self-proclaimed holy man from the early 20th century, who is set to fight in a future match of the Ragnarok. He has not made an appearance yet.

== Gods' Fighters ==
The Gods' Fighters are 13 divine warriors chosen to fight in Ragnarök. Their ranks had initially included Buddha, but he would defect to humanity's side in Round 6, later being replaced by Hades.

Thor (トール, Tōru)
Voiced by: Hikaru Midorikawa (Japanese); Jalen K. Cassell (English)
The Norse god of thunder who fights and wins the first match against Lü Bu, armed with the hammer Mjölnir and the gloves Járngreipr.
Zeus (ゼウス, Zeusu)
Voiced by: Wataru Takagi (Japanese); Chris Edgerly (English)
The supreme Greek god and chairman of the Gods' Council who fights and wins the second match, fighting barehanded against Adam.
Poseidon (ポセイドン, Poseidon)
Voiced by: Takahiro Sakurai (Japanese); Bumper Robinson^{Ep. 9 credits} (English)
The Greek god of the sea and Zeus' older brother who fights and loses the third match to Kojiro Sasaki, armed with a trident.
Hercules (ヘラクレス, Herakuresu)
Voiced by: Katsuyuki Konishi (Japanese); George Newbern (English)
A former human who ascended to become the Greek god of strength and heroism. He fights for the gods and loses the fourth match to Jack the Ripper, armed with a divine club that can transform based on beseeched power from his twelve labors.
Shiva (シヴァ, Shiva)
Voiced by: Tatsuhisa Suzuki (Japanese); Benjamin Diskin (season 1), Sean Rohani (season 2) (English)
The four-armed Hindu god of destruction and one of the three gods that make up the Trimurti who participates in and wins the fifth match, fighting barehanded against Raiden Tameemon. He was originally set to fight in the second round of Ragnarok, but was robbed of the chance in three consecutive times by Zeus, Poseidon and Heracles.
Zerofuku (零福, Zerofuku)
Voiced by: Ayumu Murase (Japanese); Meli Grant^{Ep. 23 credits} (English)
A deity armed with the divine battle axe named Misery Cleaver and the original form of the Japanese Seven Lucky Gods, a group of deities led by Bishamonten (毘沙門天), who bestow good fortune and serve as executioners of those who dare to defile the gods. Originally a kind-hearted deity who absorbed others' misfortune, Zerofuku's views on humanity changed upon witnessing humanity's deprived nature and being replaced by Buddha. This made Zerofuku resent humans enough to consider killing them all, acting on the last of his kindness to stop him by splintering himself into the Seven Lucky Gods. When Bishamonten was chosen to represent the gods in the sixth round against Buddha, he absorbed the other Lucky Gods to resume their true form as a grudge-driven Zerofuku. The two battled to a standstill before Buddha rekindles Zerofuku's old self, only to be consumed when Hajun reconstitutes himself to continue the fight. Zerofuku aids Buddha in spirit by performing Völundr to become his weapon to kill Hajun, dying while departing in peace.
Hajun (波旬, Hajun)
Voiced by: Tetsu Inada (Japanese); Michael-Leon Wooley^{Ep. 25 credits} (English)
The Demon Lord of the Sixth Heaven, Hajun is known as a legendary berserker of the netherworld, whose rampage destroyed the half of it, but his vast power eventually destroyed his own body. Considered a demon of legend, Hajun is not known by much people, even the King of Netherworld, Hades is just barely recognizing him from an old poem. Beelzebub found and cultivated his remains into a seed he planted in Zerofuku, which germinated when the deity lost his resentment towards humanity. The revived Hajun consumed Zerofuku to recreate his body, taking over in the deity's match with Buddha before being killed by the ascended human.
Hades (ハデス, Hadesu)
Voiced by: Ryōtarō Okiayu (Japanese); J. Michael Tatum^{Ep. 26 credits} (English)
The Greek god of the underworld who replaced Buddha on the gods' roster, participating in and losing the seventh match against Qin Shi Huang while seeking vengeance for his brother Poseidon. He wields a bident fused with the remnants of Poseidon's trident.
Beelzebub (ベルゼブブ, Beruzebubu)
Voiced by: Daisuke Namikawa (Japanese); Brandon McInnis^{Ep. 26 credits} (English)
A Philistine deity portrayed as a demon in Jewish and Christian lore. Known as The Lord of Flies, he fights and defeats Nikola Tesla in the eighth match of Ragnarok, armed with the "Staff of Apomyius," a cane that enhances his body's vibrations for offense and defense, depending on which hand Beelzebub uses to wield it. His staff was a gift from Hades. He is also known as 'Anathema' meaning 'the one who is cursed by Satan', which title refers to the condition Beelzebub is in, as whenever Beelzebub's love reaches its peak, Satan will take over his body and rip out the heart of anyone whom Beelzebub holds dear. This caused Beelzebub to be separated and ostracized by the other gods, eventually making him develop suicidal tendences and self-hate after discovering that the killer of his only friends, Satan is inside his own mind.
Apollo (アポロン, Aporon)
Voiced by: Kenichi Suzumura^{Ep. 39 credits} (Japanese); Chris Hackney^{Ep. 39 credits} (English)
The Greek god of the sun, who fights and wins in the ninth match against Spartan King Leonidas. He fights with the "Threads of Artemis", strings of light that he is able to shape to any kind of tool he desires.
Susano'o no Mikoto (須佐之男命, Susanoo no Mikoto)
The Shinto god of the sea and storms. One of the three central deities of Japanese mythology who fights and loses in the tenth match against Soji Okita. He wields the "Onigiri Ame-no-Murakumo", a katana forged from his previous sword, Kusanagi no Tsurugi. The Onigiri Ame-no-Murakumo was forged through the combined efforts of great blacksmiths of humanity and gods of smithing.
Loki (ロキ, Roki)
Voiced by: Yoshitsugu Matsuoka (Japanese); Ryan Colt Levy (English)
The Norse god of deceit and "nephew" to Odin, who is obsessed with Brunhilde and fights and loses in the eleventh match against Simo Häyhä.
Odin (オーディン, Ōdin)
Voiced by: Show Hayami (Japanese); Bill Butts (English)
The supreme Norse god, father of Thor and "uncle" of Loki, who fights in the twelfth match against Sakata Kintoki. Before the start of the tenth round, Beelzebub and Buddha confront Odin, and Beelzebub discovers Odin's secret plan: to sacrifice mankind in order to revive the Primordial Gods and return the universe to its original state.
Anubis (アヌビス, Anubisu)
The Egyptian god of death, mummification, and embalmment. He was originally the fighter of the tenth round of the tournament, until Susano'o no Mikoto appeared and took his place, much to his displeasure. Later, Loki took his place as the gods' representative in round eleven.

== Humans ==
Chen Gong (陳宮公台, Chin Kyū Kōdai)
Voiced by: Daiki Hamano (Japanese); Stephen Fu (English)
An advisor to the warlord Lü Bu during the late Eastern Han dynasty of China. He appears during Round 1 to support Lü Bu. After Lü Bu is killed by Thor, Chen Gong, alongside the rest of Lü Bu's army, chose to follow his lord into the afterlife.
Red Hare (赤兎馬, Sekito)
The legendary horse of Lü Bu during the late Eastern Han dynasty of China. He appears during Round 1, serving as Lü Bu's mount during his entrance, and later after his legs were shattered after one of Thor's attacks. After Lü Bu is killed by Thor, Red Hare, alongside the rest of Lü Bu's army, chose to follow his lord into the afterlife.
Zhang Fei (張飛益徳, Chō Hi Ekitoku)
Voiced by: Kōji Ishii (Japanese); Donald Li (English)
A Chinese general serving under Liu Bei during the late Eastern Han dynasty and early Three Kingdoms period of China. He appears during Round 1 to support Lü Bu.
Liu Bei (劉備玄徳, Ryū Bi Gentoku)
Voiced by: Akihiro Tajima (Japanese); Aleks Le (English)
A Chinese warlord during the late Eastern Han dynasty of China and founding emperor of Shu Han. He appears during Round 1 to support Lü Bu, and later during Round 7 to support Qin Shi Huang.
Guan Yu (関羽雲長, Kan U Un-chō)
Voiced by: Akihiro Tajima (Japanese); Keone Young (English)
A Chinese general serving under Liu Bei during the late Eastern Han dynasty of China. He appears during Round 1 to support Lü Bu.
Cao Cao (曹操孟徳, Sō Sō Mōtoku)
A Chinese warlord and statesman who rose to power during the late Eastern Han dynasty of China. He appears during a flashback of Lü Bu's life, overseeing the executions of Lü Bu and his army.
Michelangelo (ミケランジェロ, Mikeranjero)
Voiced by: Kazuki Souya (Japanese); Bumper Robinson (English)
An Italian sculptor, painter, architect, and poet of the High Renaissance. He appears during Round 2, sketching a picture of Adam.
Wolfgang Amadeus Mozart (ヴォルフガング・アマデウス・モーツァルト, Vorufugangu Amadeusu Mōtsaruto)
An influential German composer of the Classical period. He appears during Round 2, after Hermes plays Johann Sebastian Bach's Air on the G String to assist Zeus' entry, turning to Bach to confirm the song played was his.
Johann Sebastian Bach (ヨハン・ゼバスティアン・バッハ, Yohan Zebasutian Bahha)
A German composer and musician of the late Baroque period. He appears during Round 2, after Hermes plays his Air on the G String to assist Zeus' entry, crying at how well the god had played it.
Eve (イヴ, Ivu)
Voiced by: Naoko Komatsu (Japanese); Xanthe Huynh (English)
The first woman and wife of Adam. She appears during Round 2 to support her husband.
Cain (カイン, Kain)
Voiced by: Shuichi Uchida (Japanese); Aleks Le (English)
The first son of Adam and Eve. He appears during Round 2 to support his father.
Abel (アベル, Aberu)
The second son of Adam and Eve. He appears during Round 2 to support his father.
Iori Miyamoto (宮本 伊織, Miyamoto Iori)
Voiced by: Chikako Sugimura (Japanese); Xanthe Huynh (English)
A Japanese samurai and adoptive son of Musashi Miyamoto. He appears during Round 3, initially skeptical of the selection of Kojiro Sasaki over someone like his father, but later supported him after Sasaki proved his worth.
Seijuro Yoshioka (吉岡清十郎, Yoshioka Seijurō)
A Japanese swordsman and head of the Yoshioka-ryū house of swordsmanship who fought Musashi Miyamoto. He appears during Round 3, initially skeptical of the selection of Kojiro Sasaki over someone like Miyamoto, but later supported him after Sasaki proved his worth.
Inshun Hozoin (宝蔵院 胤舜, Hōzō-in Inshun)
Voiced by: Tomohiro Yamaguchi (Japanese); Jason Palmer (English)
A Japanese warrior-monk and founder of the Hōzōin-ryū school of spearmanship. He appears during Round 3, initially skeptical of the selection of Kojiro Sasaki over someone like Musashi Miyamoto, but later supported him after Sasaki proved his worth.
Musashi Miyamoto (宮本 武蔵, Miyamoto Musashi)
Voiced by: Tsuguo Mogami (Japanese); Benjamin Diskin (English)
A Japanese swordsman, philosopher, strategist, writer, and rōnin. In life, he was one of the many skilled swordsmen that were challenged by Kojiro Sasaki. He appears during Round 3, bitter at how Sasaki was chosen over someone like himself, but later supported Sasaki after he proved his worth. He later appears during Round 10, watching Soji Okita's battle against Susano'o no Mikoto.
Kagekatsu Toda (富田 景勝, Toda Kagekatsu)
The nephew of Seigen Toda and kenjutsu instructor at the latter's dojo. In life, he believed Kojiro Sasaki to have no talent with swordsmanship, being easily angered by the latter's laziness when it came to training. However, after returning from a six months break from the dojo, Sasaki swiftly defeated Kagekatsu, earning his respect. He later appears during Round 3 to support Sasaki.
Kagemasa Toda (富田 景政, Toda Kagemasa)
Voiced by: Akihiro Tajima (Japanese); Patrick Seitz (English)
The brother of Seigen Toda and father of Kagekatsu Toda. He served as an assistant instructor at Seigen's dojo. While he initially believed Kojiro Sasaki to have no talent with swordsmanship, joking that the young boy was a "budding merchant". However, after Sasaki returned to the dojo after a six months absence and easily defeated Kagekatsu, Kagemasa gained immense respect for the young swordsman. He later appears during Round 3 to support Sasaki.
Seigen Toda (富田 景政, Toda Seigen)
Voiced by: Tadashi Miyazawa (Japanese); Donald Li (English)
A Japanese swordsman and master of the Chujō-ryū sword style. He was also Kojiro Sasaki's kenjutsu instructor. He later appears during Round 3 to support Sasaki.
Ittosai Itto (伊藤一刀斎景久, Itō Ittōsai Kagehisa)
A Japanese swordsman and founder of the Ittō-ryū school of sword fighting. During life, Kojiro Sasaki challenged him to a duel, which Itto would win. He later appears during Round 3 to support Sasaki.
Sekishusai Yagyu (柳生石舟斎平宗厳, Yagyū Sekishūsai Taira-no-Munetoshi)
A Japanese swordsman and master of the Yagyū Shinkage-ryū school of sword fighting. During life, Kojiro Sasaki challenged him to a duel, which Yagyu would win. He later appears during Round 3 to support Sasaki.
Nobutsuna Kamiizumi (上泉伊勢守信綱, Kamiizumi Ise-no-kami Nobutsuna)
Voiced by: Kazuki Souya (Japanese); Mark Atherlay (English)
A Japanese swordsman and founder of the Shinkage-ryū school of sword fighting. During life, Kojiro Sasaki challenged him to a duel, which Kamiizumi would win. He later appears during Round 3 to support Sasaki.
Arthur Conan Doyle (アーサー・コナン・ドイル, Asā Konan Doiru)
Voiced by: Yuji Murai (Japanese); Tony Curran (English)
A British novelist known for creating the Sherlock Holmes series. He appears during Round 4, explaining the history of Jack the Ripper to a couple of spectators that were unaware of who he was.
William Shakespeare (ウィリアム・シェイクスピア, Wiriamu Sheikusupia)
Voiced by: Tsuguo Mogami (Japanese); Thomas Bromhead (English)
An English playwright, poet, and actor, regarded as the greatest writer in the English language. He appears during Round 4, spectating the match between Jack the Ripper and Heracles.
Castor (カストール, Kasstōru)
Voiced by: Makoto Koichi (Japanese); Reba Buhr (English)
A young Greek boy from Thebes. He was the childhood friend of Heracles, then known as Alcides. He later appears during Round 4 to support Alcides.
Mary (メアリー, Mearī)
Voiced by: Naoko Komatsu (Japanese); Victoria Atkin (English)
A prostitute who lived in Victorian London and the mother of the future Jack the Ripper. One day, Mary was visited by a struggling playwright, Jack Smith, who promised to come back and marry her out of poverty once one of his plays became famous. Holding onto this promise, Mary decided to give birth to the playwright's son, naming him "Jack" after his father. However, Jack Smith did not keep his promise, instead marrying a noblewoman after becoming successful. After news of this got out, Mary had a psychotic breakdown, yelling at her son that she wished she had never given birth to him. As a result, Jack stabbed her in the neck, calling the color of her fear "beautiful", and held her as she bled out.
Jack Smith (ジャック・スミス, Jakku Sumisu)
Voiced by: Yuji Murai (Japanese); Tony Curran (English)
A playwright who lived in Victorian London. One day, while struggling to make ends meet, he visited a brothel, where he met Mary. Having seemingly fallen in love with her at first sight, he promised her that, once he became successful, he would come back and marry her out of poverty. Unbeknownst to him, this encounter resulted in him fathering a son, the future Jack the Ripper. Despite his promise, Smith proceeded to marry a noblewoman after one of his plays, Gin and Rose in the Slums, became successful. This, unknowingly, caused Mary to have a psychotic break, which eventually led to her son, Jack, killing her in cold blood. After murdering his mother, Jack tracked Smith down to his estate, and revealed his identity as the latter's son before slicing Smith's throat.
Anne (アン, An)
Voiced by: Akari Kikunaga (Japanese); Kari Wahlgreen (English)
A British prostitute who lived in the same brothel as Mary and her son, the future Jack the Ripper. She frequently served as a mother-figure to the young Jack while his mother was working, taking pity on the young boy for having to have been born into such a status. She later appears during Round 4 to support Jack.
Isami Kondo (近藤 勇, Kondō Isami)
Voiced by: Wataru Takagi (Japanese); Paul Nakauchi (English)
A Japanese swordsman and commander of the Shinsengumi. He appears throughout the series, watching Ragnarök alongside Soji Okita, Kojiro Sasaki, and Hrist. He also appears as the chief supporter of Okita during Round 10.
Kajinosuke Tanikaze (谷風梶之助, Tanikaze Kajinosuke)
Voiced by: Satoru Ito (Japanese); SungWon Cho (English)
A Japanese sumo wrestler, recognized as the fourth yokozuna. He also served as the coach for a young Raiden Tameemon. He appears during Round 5 to support Raiden.
Kisaburo Onogawa (小野川喜三郎, Onogawa Kisaburō)
A Japanese sumo wrestler, recognized as the fifth yokozuna. He appears during Round 5 to support Raiden Tameemon.
Genpaku Sugita (杉田 玄白, Sugita Genpaku)
Voiced by: Daiki Hamano (Japanese); Paul Nakauchi (English)
A Japanese physician and scholar known for his translation of Kaitai Shinsho (New Book of Anatomy) and a founder of Rangaku (Western learning) and Ranpō (Dutch style medicine) in Japan. He appears during Round 5 to support Raiden Tameemon.
Hokusai Katsushika (葛飾 北斎, Katsushika Hokusai)
Voiced by: Yuji Murai
A Japanese artist, ukiyo-e painter and printmaker during the Edo period, famous for the woodblock print series Thirty-Six Views of Mount Fuji, which includes the iconic print The Great Wave off Kanagawa. He appears during Round 5 to support Raiden Tameemon.
Hanemon Seki (半右衛門関, Seki Hanemon)
Voiced by: Akihiro Tajima (Japanese); Andrew Kishino (English)
Father of Tarokichi Seki, who would later become Raiden Tameemon. While he was concerned for his son's well-being when he was unable to walk by the age of 2, he expressed extreme joy when he started. He also respected Tarokichi's determination to learn how to walk, even when his muscles crushed all of his bones. He later appears during Round 5 to support his son.
Ken Seki (席 ケン, Seki Ken)
Voiced by: Chikako Sugimura (Japanese); Anne Yatco (English)
Mother of Tarokichi Seki, who would later become Raiden Tameemon. She was extremely worried for her son's well-being when he was unable to walk by the age of 2, praying to the Gods every day to give her son the strength to walk. She used this story to console Tarokichi after the other village children started fearing him, telling him to use his strength for good. She later appears during Round 5 to support her son.
Toraji (寅次, Toraji)
A young Japanese boy from the same village as Tarokichi Seki, the future Raiden Tameemon. During his youth, Toraji had an immense passion for sumo, and frequently played with the children of the village. However, he grew fearful of the young Tarokichi after the latter was able to throw him out of the ring with just one hit, calling him a "monster". He later appears during Round 5 to support Raiden.
Yohachi Urakaze (浦風 親方, Urakaze Yohachi)
A Japanese sumo wrestler who was in charge of the Urakaze stable while Raiden Tameemon and Kajinosuke Tanikaze were training there. He later appears during Round 5 to support Raiden.
Confucius (孔子, Kōshi)
A Chinese philosopher and founder of Confucianism, as well as a member of the Four Sages. He appears during Round 6 to support Buddha. His character was omitted from the anime adaptation.
Socrates (ソクラテス, Sokuratesu)
A Greek philosopher credited as the founder of Western philosophy, as well as a member of the Four Sages. He appears during Round 6 to support Buddha. His character was omitted from the anime adaptation.
Jesus (イエス, Iesu)
A Jewish philosopher and founder of Christianity, as well as a member of the Four Sages. He appears during Round 6 to support Buddha. His character was omitted from the anime adaptation.
Suddhodana (スッドーダナ王, Suddōdana-ō)
Voiced by: Tsuguo Mogami (Japanese); Doug Stone (English)
A king of the Shakya and father of Siddhartha Gautama. He appears during Round 6 to support his son.
Jataka (ジャータカ, Jātaka)
Voiced by: Kenji Nojima
An ancient Indian prince that served as an older brother-figure to Siddhartha Gautama. Jataka was a just ruler who served his people well, but eventually became ill and bedridden. One day, while Siddhartha was visiting him, Jataka confessed his thoughts concerning his own happiness, expressing a desire to travel and see the world. At his funeral, Siddhartha achieved Enlightenment and took his coffin from the procession and laid it in a river, realizing Jataka's dream. He later appears during Round 6 to support Buddha.
Zhu Yuanzhang (朱元璋, Shu Genshō)
Founder of the Ming dynasty. He appears during Round 7 to support Qin Shi Huang.
Liu Bang (劉邦, Kan no Koso)
Founder of the Han dynasty. He appears during Round 7 to support Qin Shi Huang.
Liu Che (劉徹, Kan Butei)
The seventh emperor of the Han dynasty and one of the longest reigning Chinese emperors. He appears during Round 7 to support Qin Shi Huang.
Cao Pi (曹丕, Sō Hi)
The first emperor of the state of Cao Wei during the Three Kingdoms period. He appears during Round 7 to support Qin Shi Huang.
Sun Quan (孫權孙权, Sonken)
Founder of the Eastern Wu dynasty during the Three Kingdoms period. He appears during Round 7 to support Qin Shi Huang.
Chun Yan (春燕, Shun'en)
Voiced by: Ayumi Orii (Japanese); Crystal Lee (English)
A Chinese woman who served as bodyguard and caretaker for Ying Zheng, the future Qin Shi Huang. In 260 BCE, her son, Chun Ou, was unfortunately buried alive at Changping alongside hundreds of Zhao soldiers. As a result, she grew to hate the Qin. Despite her hatred, she grew affectionate for the young Ying Zheng, who was being held prisoner in Zhao territory, after learning about his ailment. After 2 years of caring for the young boy, Ying Zheng was called back to the Qin state, as his father had recently ascended to the throne. While on route, the carriage that was being used to carry Ying Zheng was ambushed by people wishing to kill the crown prince. As the fight ensued, Chun Yan was killed, using her final breaths to encourage Ying Zheng to walk the path he believed in and become the greatest king of all. She later appears during Round 7 to support Qin Shi Huang.
Chun Ou (春闘, Shuntō)
A young Chinese boy who was unfortunately buried alive in 260 BCE alongside hundreds of Zhao soldiers. He later appears during Round 7 to support Qin Shi Huang alongside his mother, Chun Yan.
Galileo Galilei (ガリレオ・ガリレイ, Garireo Garirei)
An Italian astronomer, physicist, and engineer who has been called the "Father of Modern Science". He appears during Round 8 to support Nikola Tesla.
Albert Einstein (アルベルト・アインシュタイン, Aruberuto Ainshutain)
A German physicist who is regarded as one of the greatest and most influential physicists of all time. He appears during Round 8 to support Nikola Tesla.
Marie Curie (マリ・キュリー, Mari Kyurī)
A Polish physicist and chemist who conducted pioneering research on radioactivity. She appears during Round 8 to support Nikola Tesla.
Isaac Newton (アイザック・ニュートン, Aizakku Nyūton)
An English mathematician, physicist, astronomer, alchemist, theologian, and author who was a key figure in the Scientific Revolution and the Enlightenment that followed. He appears during Round 8 to support Nikola Tesla.
Alfred Nobel (アルフレッド・ノーベル, Arufureddo Nōberu)
A Swedish chemist, engineer, inventor, businessman, and philanthropist known for the invention of dynamite and the Nobel Prize. He appears during Round 8 to support Nikola Tesla.
Thomas Edison (トーマス・エジソン, Tōmasu Ejison)
An American inventor and businessman who developed many devices in fields such as electric power generation, mass communication, sound recording, and motion pictures. He appears during Round 8 to support Nikola Tesla.
Ensign T (少尉 T, Shōi T)
A second lieutenant in the US Navy who participated in the Philadelphia Experiment. While the military claimed the experiment was to make a ship invisible to radars, the true objective was to use tesla coils to cause the ship to teleport. While the mission was successful at making the ship teleport, it resulted in the deaths and disappearances of 13 soldiers and scientists, and caused 6 others to go insane. The scene was so gruesome that it caused Ensign T to develop post-traumatic stress disorder. While he initially kept quiet about the event, Ensign T would eventually leak the true purpose of the event to the media.
Dane Tesla (ダン・テスラ, Dan Tesura)
The older brother of Nikola Tesla. Dane was a young inventor who was well-known around their village and served as Nikola's main inspiration to pursue science. One day, Dane was hired to design a new windmill for the village, but he quickly became stressed over whether his new design would work or not. However, Nikola reassured Dane, stating that, even if the design fails the first time, they can just keep trying, causing him to regain his resolve and start building the windmill. However, one particularly stormy night, Dane went to check on the windmill only for his horse to be struck by lightning, immediately killing him. After that, his windmill design ended up being flawed, causing it not to move. As a result, Dane's genius was eventually forgotten by the townsfolk and the young inventor faded into obscurity. He later appears during Round 8 to support Nikola.
Milka Tesla (ミルカ・テスラ, Miruka Tesura)
Sister of Nikola Tesla. She appears in a bonus chapter where a young Nikola attempts to fix her terrible cooking, only for her to add honey to the stew and make it worse.
Xerxes I (クセルクセス1世, Kuserukusesu 1-sei)
The fourth King of Kings of the Achaemenid Empire who led the Persian forces during the Battle of Thermopylae. He appears in a flashback to Leonidas's life, leading his forces against the Greeks.
Hagis (ハギス, Hagisu)
A young Spartan soldier and staunch follower of Leonidas. When Leonidas went against the elders wishes and chose to fight against the invading Persians, Hagis was one of the 300 Spartan soldiers that chose to follow their king, fighting alongside him at the Battle of Thermopylae. He later appears during Round 9 to support Leonidas.
Shinpachi Nakagura (永倉 新八, Nagakura Shinpachi)
A Japanese swordsman and captain of the second unit of the Shinsengumi. He appears during Round 10 to support Soji Okita.
Hajime Saito (斎藤 一, Saitō Hajime)
A Japanese swordsman and captain of the third unit of the Shinsengumi. He appears during Round 10 to support Soji Okita.
Heisuke Todo (藤堂 平助, Tōdō Heisuke)
A Japanese swordsman and captain of the eighth unit of the Shinsengumi. He appears during Round 10 to support Soji Okita.
Kai Shimada (島田 魁, Shimada Kai)
A Japanese swordsman and spy for the Shinsengumi. He appears during Round 10 to support Soji Okita.
Keisuke Yamanami (山南 敬助, Yamanami Keisuke)
A Japanese swordsman and vice-commander of the Shinsengumi. He appears during Round 10 to support Soji Okita.
Genzaburo Inoue (井上 源三郎, Inoue Genzaburō)
A Japanese swordsman and captain of the sixth unit of the Shinsengumi. He appears during Round 10 to support Soji Okita.
Eisaburo Abiru (阿比留 鋭三郎, Abiru Eisaburō)
A Japanese swordsman and member of the Shinsengumi. He appears during Round 10 to support Soji Okita.
Sanosuke Harada (原田 左之助, Harada Sanosuke)
A Japanese swordsman and captain of the tenth unit of the Shinsengumi. He appears during Round 10 to support Soji Okita.
Yasutsuna Hoki (伯耆安綱, Hoki Yasutsuna)
A Japanese swordsmith and creator of the dōjigiri. He, alongside Munechika Sanjo, Kunitsuna Awataguchi, Kanayagokami, and Hephaestus, reforged Susano'o's Ame-no-Murakumo-no-Tsurugi into the Onigiri Ame-no-Murakumo.
Munechika Sanjo (三条宗近, Sanjō Munechika)
A Japanese swordsmith and creator of the mikazuki. He, alongside Yasutsuna Hoki, Kunitsuna Awataguchi, Kanayagokami, and Hephaestus, reforged Susano'o's Ame-no-Murakumo-no-Tsurugi into the Onigiri Ame-no-Murakumo.
Kunitsuna Awataguchi (粟田口国綱, Awataguchi Kunitsuna)
A Japanese swordsmith and creator of the onimaru. He, alongside Munechika Sanjo, Kunitsuna Awataguchi, Kanayagokami, and Hephaestus, reforged Susano'o's Ame-no-Murakumo-no-Tsurugi into the Onigiri Ame-no-Murakumo.
Toshizo Hijikata (土方 歳三, Hijikata Toshizō)
A Japanese swordsman and vice-commander of the Shinsengumi. He appears in a bonus chapter, relenting how Soji Okita was chosen to represent humanity over him.
Ichimatsu (斎藤一, Ichimatsu)
A young Japanese boy and son of the gardener Heigoro, who cared for Soji Okita while he was bedridden. He later appears during Round 10 to support Okita.

== Gods ==
Hermes (ヘルメス, Herumesu)
Voiced by: Junichi Suwabe (Japanese); Cory Yee (English)
The herald of the Greek gods and Zeus's butler, often seen giving play-by-play commentary for Ares.
Aphrodite (アフロディテ, Afurodite)
Voiced by: Rie Tanaka (Japanese); Reba Buhr (English)
The Greek goddess of love. She is accompanied by a group of stone golems that she uses as a throne that holds up her large breasts.
Heimdall (ヘイムダル, Heimudaru)
Voiced by: Yukihiro Nozuyama (Japanese); Kellen Goff (English)
A Norse god who keeps watch for invaders and the onset of Ragnarök. He oversees and comments on the fights of Ragnarok.
Huginn and Muninn (フギン&ムニン, Fugin & Munin)
Voiced by: Taisuke Nakano (Huginn), Tomohiro Yamaguchi (Muninn) (Japanese); Michael Chapman (Huginn), Ben Pronsky (Muninn) (English)
A pair of ravens that fly all over the world, Midgard, and bring information to the god Odin. They are usually seen resting on Odin's shoulders, being his main form to communicate, since Odin himself does not speak much.
Ares (アレス, Aresu)
Voiced by: Hinata Tadakoro (Japanese); Tim Friedlander (English)
The Greek god of courage and war, often feigning knowing how fighters pull special moves.
Forseti (フォルセティ, Foruseti)
Voiced by: Satoru Itou (Japanese); Paul Castro Jr. (English)
The Norse god of justice and reconciliation. He appears during Round 1 to support Thor.
Tyr (テュール, Tyūru)
The Norse god of war. He was killed years before Ragnarök while defending Asgard from the Jötnar.
Parvati (パールヴァティー, Pāruvatī)
Voiced by: Chikako Sugimura (Japanese); Anjali Kunapaneni (English)
The Hindu goddess of fertility, love, and beauty, as well as Shiva's first wife. She appears during Round 5 to support Shiva.
Kali (カーリー, Kārī)
Voiced by: Moe Nagamuta
The Hindu goddess of time, death, and the end of the world, as well as Shiva's second wife. She appears during Round 5 to support Shiva.
Durga (ドゥルガー, Durugā)
Voiced by: Misato Matsuoka (Japanese); Lipica Shah (English)
The Hindu goddess of war, as well as Shiva's third wife. She appears during Round 5 to support Shiva.
Ganesha (ガネーシャ, Ganēsha)
Voiced by: Naoko Komatsu
The Hindu god of success, wisdom, and new beginnings. He appears during Round 5 to support Shiva, his father.
Rudra (ルドラ, Rudora)
Voiced by: Shūhei Sakaguchi (Japanese); Kamran Nikhad (adult), Anne Yacto (child) (English)
The Hindu god of storms. He was the best friend of Shiva during their childhood, and dreamed of becoming the strongest god in Svarga. However, he would eventually abandon his dream after Shiva threw their match to see who was strongest. He later appears during Round 5 to support Shiva.
Shumbha (シュンバ, Shunba)
Voiced by: Akihiro Tajima (Japanese); Michael Benyaer (English)
The older of the Asura brothers. He and his brother, Nishumbha, fought against Rudra and Shiva in the past after attacking a village. He later appears during Round 5 to support Shiva.
Nishumbha (ニシュンバ, Nishunba)
Voiced by: Satoru Ito (Japanese); Sean T. Krishnan (English)
The younger of the Asura brothers. He and his brother, Shumbha, fought against Rudra and Shiva in the past after attacking a village. He later appears during Round 5 to support Shiva.
Agni (アグニ, Aguni)
The Hindu god of fire. He was defeated, alongside Varuna, by Rudra and Shiva during the former's quest to become the strongest god in Svarga. He later appears during Round 5 to support Shiva.
Varuna (ヴァルナ, Varuna)
Voiced by: Daiki Hamano (Japanese); Sean T. Krishnan (English)
The Hindu god of water. He was defeated, alongside Agni, by Rudra and Shiva during the former's quest to become the strongest god in Svarga. He later appears during Round 5 to support Shiva.
Indra (インドラ, Indora)
The Hindu god of lightning. He was defeated by Rudra and Shiva during the former's quest to become the strongest god in Svara. He later appears during Round 5 to support Shiva.
Vishnu (ヴィシュヌ, Vishunu)
Voiced by: Shuichi Uchida (Japanese); Maaz Ali (English)
The Hindu god of preservation. He was defeated, alongside Brahma, by Rudra and Shiva during the former's quest to become the strongest god in Svarga. He later appears during Round 5 to support Shiva.
Brahma (ブラフマー, Burafumā)
Voiced by: Yuji Murai (Japanese); Noshir Dalal (English)
The Hindu god of creation. He was defeated, alongside Vishnu, by Rudra and Shiva during the former's quest to become the strongest god in Svarga. He later appears during Round 5 to support Shiva.
Bishamonten (毘沙門天, Bishamonten)
Voiced by: Akihiro Tajima (Japanese); Sean Rohani (English)
The Shinto god of fortune in war and battles and leader of the Seven Lucky Gods. He was initially chosen as one of the Gods' Fighters, chosen to fight in Round 6 against Buddha, before he fused with the other Lucky Gods to create Zerofuku.
Ebisu (恵比寿, Ebisu)
Voiced by: Shintaro Ohata (Japanese); Andrew Kishino (English)
The Shinto god of fortune in fishing and trading and member of the Seven Lucky Gods. During Round 6, he fused with the other Lucky Gods to create Zerofuku.
Benzaiten (弁財天, Benzaiten)
Voiced by: Akari Kikunaga (Japanese); Marin M. Miller (English)
The Shinto goddess of fortune in music, art, and knowledge and member of the Seven Lucky Gods. During Round 6, she fused with the other Lucky Gods to create Zerofuku.
Hoteison (布袋尊, Hoteison)
Voiced by: Daiki Hamano (Japanese); Mike Haimoto (eps.17, 18 and 22), Alejandro Saab (eps. 23 and 24) (English)
The Shinto god of fortune in business and plenitude and member of the Seven Lucky Gods. During Round 6, he fused with the other Lucky Gods to create Zerofuku.
Fukurokuju (福禄寿, Fukurokuju)
Voiced by: Kazuki Souya (Japanese); Keone Young (English)
The Shinto god of fortune in wealth and happiness and member of the Seven Lucky Gods. During Round 6, he fused with the other Lucky Gods to create Zerofuku.
Daikokuten (大黒天, Daikokuten)
Voiced by: Mayumi Shintani (Japanese); Jenny Yokobori (English)
The Shinto god of fortune in cooking, farming, and banking and member of the Seven Lucky Gods. During Round 6, he fused with the other Lucky Gods to create Zerofuku.
Jurojin (寿老人, Jurōjin)
Voiced by: Tsuguo Mogami (Japanese); Johnny Yong Bosch (English)
The Shinto god of fortune in longevity and member of the Seven Lucky Gods. During Round 6, he fused with the other Lucky Gods to create Zerofuku.
Proteus (プローテウス, Purōteusu)
The Greek god of rivers and oceanic bodies of water. He served as Poseidon's servant until his death during Ragnarök, after which he presented Hades with the shattered remnants of Poseidon's trident in hopes that Hades would use them during his round to avenge his master. He later appears during Round 7 to support Hades.
Adamas (アダマス, Adamasu)
Voiced by: Tsuguo Mogami^{Ep. 9 credits} (Japanese); Elias Toufexis^{Ep. 33 credits} (English)
The Greek god of conquest and older brother of Zeus, whom he attempted to overthrow after the Titanomachy. While seemingly killed by Poseidon with his existence expunged from historical records, Adamas survived after Hades arranged for him to be healed by Beelzebub, remaining in Helheim under the name of "Adamantine".
Gaia (ガイア, Gaia)
The Greek primordial goddess and personification of the Earth. Shortly after the Titanomachy, Gaia, unsupportive of Zeus' ascension to King of the Cosmos, rallied together the Giants, her children, in a war against the gods, known as the Gigantomachy.
Lilith (リリス, Ririsu)
A goddess known for being the first wife of Adam. At some point in the past, she joined Beelzebub on his quest to kill Satan, after learning it was him who had killed Lucifer. However, after falling in love with her, Beelzebub would become possessed by Satan yet again and kill Lilith. In her final moments, Lilith wished for Beelzebub to keep living, and placed a blessing on him that prevented him from ever being killed, either by himself or others.
Kanayagokami (金屋子神, Kanayagokami)
The Shinto goddess of metalworking and technology. She, alongside Yasutsuna Hoki, Munechika Sanjo, Kunitsuna Awataguchi, and Hephaestus, reforged Susano'o's Ame-no-Murakumo-no-Tsurugi into the Onigiri Ame-no-Murakumo. She later appears during Round 10, spectating the match between Soji Okita and Susano'o.
Hephaestus (ヘーパイストス, Hēpaisutosu)
The Greek god of fire, volcanoes, and blacksmiths. He, alongside Yasutsuna Hoki, Munechika Sanjo, Kunitsuna Awataguchi, and Kanayagokami, reforged Susano'o's Ame-no-Murakumo-no-Tsurugi into the Onigiri Ame-no-Murakumo.
Amaterasu Ōkami (天照大神, Amaterasu Ōkami)
The Shinto goddess of the sun and chief kami of the pantheon, as well as one of the Three Noble Gods, ruling over the heavens.
Tsukuyomi no Mikoto (月夜見の尊, Tsukuyomi no Mikoto)
The Shinto god of the moon and one of the Three Noble Gods, ruling over the oceans.
Izanagi (伊邪那岐, Izanagi)
A primordial god, Shinto god of creation, and father of the Three Noble Gods who instructed his children to rule over the world.
Primordial Odin (オーディン, Ōdin)
A primordial god and the original incarnation of the Norse god Odin. In the ancient past, Odin was one of the original 88 primordial gods from whom all other gods spawned. He led a team known as Yggdrasil, whose goal it was to destroy the "lesser" gods that had come to be after the original 88. After fighting with the other primordial gods, Odin was sealed away along with the rest of Yggdrasil to prevent further calamity. In a last, desperate maneuver, the members of Yggdrasil stored their spirits into divine treasures to be reawakened, Odin storing his spirit in his sword Gram. Eons later, a nameless god found the sword and was possessed by Odin's spirit, becoming the current incarnation of the deity.
Ymir (ユミル, Yumiru)
A primordial god and ancestor of all jötnar. In the ancient past, he was a member of Yggdrasil, led by Odin. Before being sealed away, Ymir stored his spirit in his necklace Brísingamen to be reawakened.
Chaos (カオス, Kaosu)
A primordial god of Greek mythology. In the ancient past, he was a member of Yggdrasil, led by Odin. Before being sealed away, Chaos stored his spirit in his bracelet Draupnir to be reawakened.
Satan (サタン, Satan)
A primordial god and entity in Abrahamic religions who seduces humans into sin. In the ancient past, he was a member of Yggdrasil, led by Odin. Before being sealed away, Satan stored his soul in his helmet Egil to be reawakened.

== Other characters ==
Incubus (インキュバス, Inkyubasu)
A lust demon that attempted to manipulate Brunhilde into sleeping with him in exchange for protecting her from the Gods' wrath. He was killed by Thor halfway through this confrontation. His character was omitted from the anime adaptation.
Kronos (クロノス, Kuronosu)
Leader of the Titans and the personification of time, as well as the father of Zeus and his siblings. He was killed by Zeus during the Titanomachy, but not before being the only participant to successfully land a hit on him.
The Serpent (蛇, Hebi)
A demon who, in the ancient past, attempted to rape Eve in the Garden of Eden, only to be stopped by a couple of birds that came to her aid. In retribution, the Serpent took a bite from the forbidden fruit, and used it as false evidence in a trial to have Eve cast out of the Garden. However, Adam arrived and took several bites out of the forbidden fruit, so that he could be cast out alongside Eve. Angered by this, the Serpent assumed a monstrous form and attempted to kill Adam and Eve, only to be killed himself after Adam copied his claws.
Typhon (テューポーン, Tyūpōn)
A massive hybrid creature that gained the title of "Most Fearsome Monster". In the past, he was subjugated by Adamas as part of his plan to overthrow Zeus.
Cerberus (ケルベロス, Keruberosu)
A multi-headed dog that watched over Helheim. While being loyal to Hades, he was also befriended by Heracles during his twelve labors. He appears during Round 4 when he fuses with Hercules in order to provide him with more power to fight Jack the Ripper.
Chiyou (蚩尤, Shiyū)
A demon-god considered by people of ancient China to be a God of War or God of Militaries who also created the five tools of war. He decreed that, should one wish to become a king, they should supply him with sacrifices and kneel before him, lest he dethrone and kill them. The brutal cycle would continue for centuries, until Chiyou was ultimately killed by Qin Shi Huang, allowing the later to unify all of China. His fighting techniques would also serve as the basis for Qin Shi Huang's own martial arts.
Lucifer (ルシファー, Rushifā)
An angel that befriended Beelzebub in the past. He was killed by Beelzebub after the latter was possessed by Satan.
Azazel (アザゼル, Azazeru)
An angel that befriended Beelzebub in the past. He was killed by Beelzebub after the latter was possessed by Satan.
Samael (サマエル, Samaeru)
An angel that befriended Beelzebub in the past. He was killed by Beelzebub after the latter was possessed by Satan.
Andras (アンドラス, Andorasu)
A demon who serves as a guard of Tartarus.
Flauros (フラウロス, Furaurosu)
A demon who serves as a guard of Tartarus.
Siegfried (ジークフリート, Jīkufurīto)
Voiced by: Kohsuke Toriumi^{Ep. 38 credits} (Japanese); Blythe Melin^{Ep. 38 credits} (English)
A half-god and half-human who is imprisoned in Tartarus after Loki has framed him with killing Odin's guard dragon, Fafnir. He is also Brunhilde's husband and the key element of Odin's secret plan, the resurrection of the primordial gods, with the latter being the reason for Siegfried receiving much greater punishment for his supposed crime than would be usual.
Python (ピュートーン, Pyūtōn)
Voiced by: Tetsu Shiratori^{Ep. 41 credits} (Japanese); Dino Andrade^{Ep. 41 credits} (English)
A being that was drove out of Heaven due to his hideous appearance. After experiencing the same treatment on Earth as he had in Heaven, he started terrorizing the citizens of ancient Greece. One day, after attacking the town of Delphi, he was challenged to a fight against a young Apollo. Despite losing day after day, Python refused to give up, which Apollo told him is what made him "beautiful". After hearing Apollo's kind words, Python would stop attacking humans and, out of respect for Apollo, built a temple dedicated to him, inscribing it with Apollo's signature phrase: "Know Thyself".
Yamata no Orochi (ヤマタノオロチ, Yamata no Orochi)
A legendary eight-headed Japanese dragon who was slain by Susano'o no Mikoto in the past.
