= Kanemaki Jisai =

Japanese swordsman

Kanemaki Jisai (鐘巻 自斎, c.1536 – 1615) was a master of the Chujō-ryū fighting style. He was a student of Toda Seigen and teacher to Itō Ittōsai (possibly also Sasaki Kojirō).

== Cultural Influence ==
Kanemaki Jisai is a featured character within the Japanese manga series Vagabond, in which he is a primary figure of the series' "Kojirō Arc", raising Sasaki Kojirō from his very birth and training him throughout the latter's early adulthood.
