= Miyamoto Musashi (Vagabond) =

Fictional character from Vagabond

- Vagabond character
- Miyamoto Musashi, as illustrated by Takehiko Inoue
- First appearance: Vagabond manga: Chapter 1 "Shinmen Takezo" (1998)
- Created by: Takehiko Inoue

Miyamoto Musashi (Japanese: 宮本 武蔵), born Takezo Shinmen (新免 武蔵, Shinmen Takezō), is the protagonist of Takehiko Inoue's manga series Vagabond. Seeking strength from a young age, Takezo involves himself in several battles, regardless of danger. After meeting the monk Takuan, Takezo is renamed Miyamoto Musashi and starts a new life to become invincible. Now, as an adult, Musashi faces new enemies and obtains fame through his wandering in Japan. While the manga never reached its ending, Inoue wrote pages in the form of an exhibition that depict the last days of an elder Musashi.

Based on the historical figure with the same name, Inoue became motivated to write Musashi following the ending of the basketball manga series Slam Dunk, as the artist wanted to challenge himself with a different style of main character. Inoue's take on Miyamoto Musashi earned a well-received response from the media for his growth from a young man obsessed with strength to a wise warrior who does several activities and questions his original goals.

== Role in Vagabond ==
In the aftermath of the Battle of Sekigahara, Shinmen Takezō and his childhood friend Matahachi Hon'iden swear to become "Invincible Under The Heavens" (天下無双, Tenka Musō). As they split, Takezō decides to become a vagabond and wander the world, challenging strong opponents. During a misunderstanding with Matahachi's mother, Takezō fights his pursuers, who blame him for Matahachi's desire to avoid returning to his village. However, Takezo is captured by the monk Takuan Sōhō and Matahachi's fiancé Otsu, who make him reconsider his purpose in life. Takuan frees him and, to make him start his life anew, renames him Miyamoto Musashi. After a 4-year timeskip, Musashi arrives in Kyōto, where he fights against the Yoshioka swords. Musashi takes down several students, but the area catches fire, leading to the fight being postponed. Musashi is rescued by Matahachi and treated by Takuan.

Following his recovery, Musashi decides to continue his training with a young boy, Jōtarō, wanting him to teach him. In Musashi and Jōtarō's arrival at the Hōzōin spears, Musashi's first fight against the monk Hōzōin Inshun causes him to face his fear of dying and run away. Driven by fear, he trains for a rematch which causes him to reflect on his mis relationship with his late father. As Musashi faces his fears, he challenges Inshun again and briefly overpowers his rival but spares his life. In its aftermath, Musashi and Jōtarō arrive at the Yagyū swords, where they discuss the events while deliberating how to enter the Yagyū headquarters. Musashi has a meeting with the 4 seniors, a solo fight against the Yagyū men, as well as an encounter with Sekishūsai Yagyū.

While preparing for the rematch with the Yoshioka, Musashi meets the disabled samurai Kojirō Sasaki. Both play with a snowman, simulating a brief sword fight in the process and forming a friendship. This encounter helps Musashi improve his mentality. Musashi then meets Matahachi again, who expresses jealousy over his achievements and apparent relationship with Otsu. This angers Musashi and leaves his old friend after punching him. Musashi then fights the 70 Yoshioka all alone. Although he kills all of them, one of the dying ones leaves him with a severe wound. In the aftermath of Musashi's solo battle, he makes his return to wandering despite being offered the position of mentor under guidance from Takuan. After Musashi makes peace with Matahachi, he is offered him the chance of marrying Otsu. However, Musashi wanders against and question his own ideas of being invincible upon being defeated by another wandering warrior. He later meets the orphan Iori, whom he decides to raise while dealing with a village with poor fields. Several months later, Musashi and Iori go to the retirement estate of Yūsai Hosokawa.

After the manga went on hiatus, Inoue wrote Vagabond: The LAST Manga Exhibition, which portrays the last days of Musashi as he reflects on his life achievements and the people he met.

== Creation ==
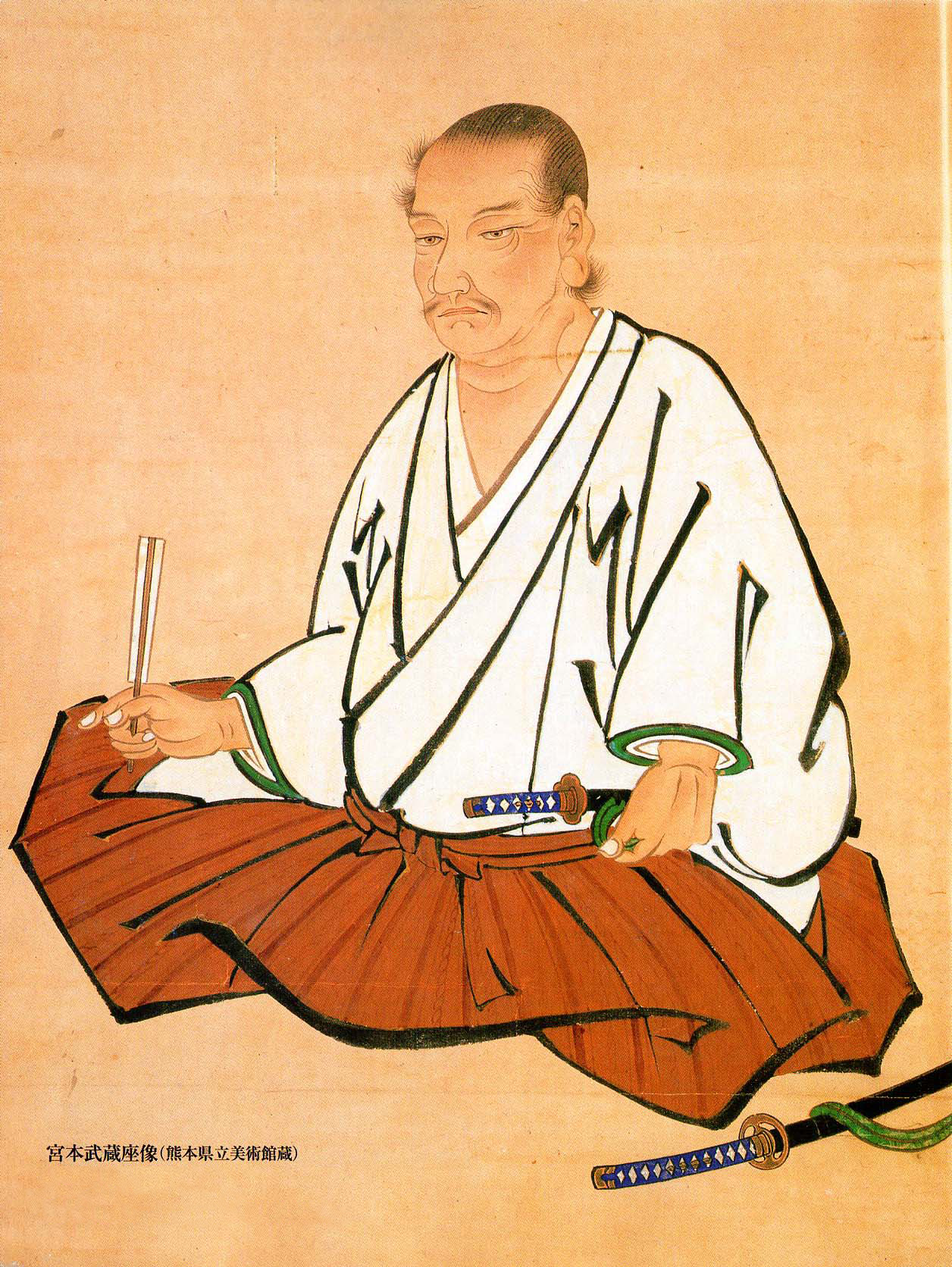
Contemporaneous portrait of Miyamoto Musashi (Edo period)

Manga author Takehiko Inoue started Vagabond, having wondered what the character of Miyamoto Musashi was like when he read Musashi. Having come off of drawing a sports manga, Slam Dunk, he wanted to create a series about more basic concepts, such as "life and death, the human condition, etc." Rather than portray Musashi's later life in his "enlightened state", which has been written about often, the author chose to depict the lesser-known "young man reaching that point of enlightenment when he comes from a place of being so like an animal". Since not much is known about the real Musashi, Inoue wanted to give his own take, which he considers more modern than other related works.

The author clarified that there are other activities besides fighting that are important for the protagonist. Should Inoue make Miyamoto constantly follow fights, the main character would die. Rather than tell a story, Inoue wants to show the life of Miyamoto, which he considers poetry. When Musashi comes face-to-face with Sekishusai, Inoue tries to make the artwork appeal to the readers. In contrast to popular belief, Inoue's Musashi does not follow the code of the samurais, bushido, but instead a more unique path with a growth path that he finds realistic. Moreover, he does not consider Musashi a samurai but instead a ronin. Other changes Inoue made when writing the manga were to make the supporting characters have different personalities from those in the novel. Inoue also expressed difficulties when drawing scenes where the characters are wounded, most notably when Musashi battles the 70 Yoshioka, which took a lot of energy to properly make. This scene was also a new idea he had when writing the manga, as he felt that Musashi required a greater challenge than in the novel.

== Reception ==
=== Critical response ===
The character of Musashi has been highly popular. The Los Angeles Times regarded Vagabond as a "samurai masterpiece" for the contrast it makes with the novel by deepening the characterization of Musashi. Another aspect praised by the Los Angeles Times was how the protagonist makes a philosophy about strength and his goal as the arc of the Yoshioka, where the main character kills 70 men, ends with him retaining a severe wound on his foot that weakens him and makes him question what it means to be invincible. Manga artist Eiichiro Oda said he enjoyed Musashi's battle against his 70 enemies based on how Inoue wrote and came to regard Musashi as a character similar to Inoue himself. Manga Life found Musashi appealing for his quest for strength. They find the early journey of Musashi impressive due to the emphasis on violence over his mental development and his connections with Matahachi. The eventual release of the sixth volume received more acclaim from Manga Life for further developing Musashi's bushido, his acceptance of his weak point, and his distant but strong bond with Matahachi. The Fandom Post was concerned about whether or not Musashi is still capable of being a true warrior when interacting with the monk Takuan as he initially comes across as brute.

According to Crunchyroll, both Slam Dunk's Hanamichi Sakuragi and Musashi are similar protagonists, being young, egotistical prodigies, but "Inoue's Musashi is a force of nature." He went on to call Inoue's take on Musashi unique when compared to the ones often depicted in fiction. Comic Book Resources praised the way Musashi addresses Bushido, the Code of the Samurai, which makes him honorable. The story arc where Musashi tries to take care of villagers, as it retains the handling of Bushido but without relying on action and using other types of strength, was praised for retaining its pacing. The Japan Times regarded Musashi's growth from ruthless warrior to wise monk warrior as well executed across the narrative.

=== Popularity ===
The 2000 Japan Media Arts Festival puts Vagabond in fourth place, congratulating Inoue's writing: "From Toyotomi to Tokugawa. Miyamoto Musashi grew up amidst the turn of two great eras. Mr. Inoue has taken the powerful Musashi who was sometimes called a 'beast' and drawn him as a vagabond. The artist brags about boldly challenging the national literary work of Eiji Yoshikawa, even so, the sense of speed that he creates is impressive. I send my applause to the artist for creating a new image of Musashi." In 2011, Inoue drew a mural at 18.2 meters (about 59.7 feet) tall and 10.3 meters (33.8 feet) wide in Tokyo. The food maker Nissin used three video cameras to record Inoue painting every brush stroke, and it edited the footage into a television commercial, encouraging Japan one month after the Great Eastern Japan Earthquake disaster. The mural remained on the Laforet Harajuku fashion store tower in Tokyo until May 7. It was later displayed in the Marui Jam Shibuya department store. Official merchandising based on Musashi with art by Inoue was also produced in 2012 by Kyukyodo.

=== Analysis ===
In his analysis of the series, Hunor Andrássy from the University of Gothenburg said that Musashi and the rest of the cast of the series represent a dynamic between different types of literature as it depicts the physical and metaphysical path Musashi treads upon during his life towards becoming one of the most renowned swordsmen. The Hōzōin arc helps in Musashi's growth but is more focused on his psychological aspect, while the Yagyū arc instead makes him humble enough to swear to improve his skills. Facultad de Lenguas (Universidad Nacional de Córdoba) compared Musashi and other characters from the manga with the cast from the manga Rurouni Kenshin, as both feature historical figures that have to live up to past-year times. Despite Musashi's notable strength and quest, José Miguel Real Mosquero noted that the real reason for Musashi's journey is for revenge against his father, Shinmen Munisai, whose words constantly haunt him. His constant meetings with Takuan were noted to have a major impact on the character as the monk started his life again. The writer also noted Musashi does not appear to have a sense of honor early in the series, as he sometimes uses dirty tactics to deceive his enemies, like throwing sand at them, being more of a man whose goals justify the means rather than employing bushido.

In "Campeones Solitarios en la Viñeta Japonesa" multiple writers compared Throfinn with other protagonists from the seinen manga demography aimed towards adults with Guts from Berserk, and Thorfinn from Vinland Saga as the three leading characters had their childhood defined by violence and how across maturity, the three seek a way to reject violence and obtain healthier lives; Both Thorfinn and Guts are initially written in notable antagonistic fashion to the readers themselves, embodying the concept of a harsh masculinity born from rage. The three victimized after tragic stories with Musashi being a poorly treated since his youth. A major part of each protagonist's growth is obtaining a more mature morality which is common in Japanese culture and thus seek redemption with Musashi finding seeking redemption through his desire to protect a village that has no wealth to feed the citizens.
