= Toda Seigen =

Japanese swordsman

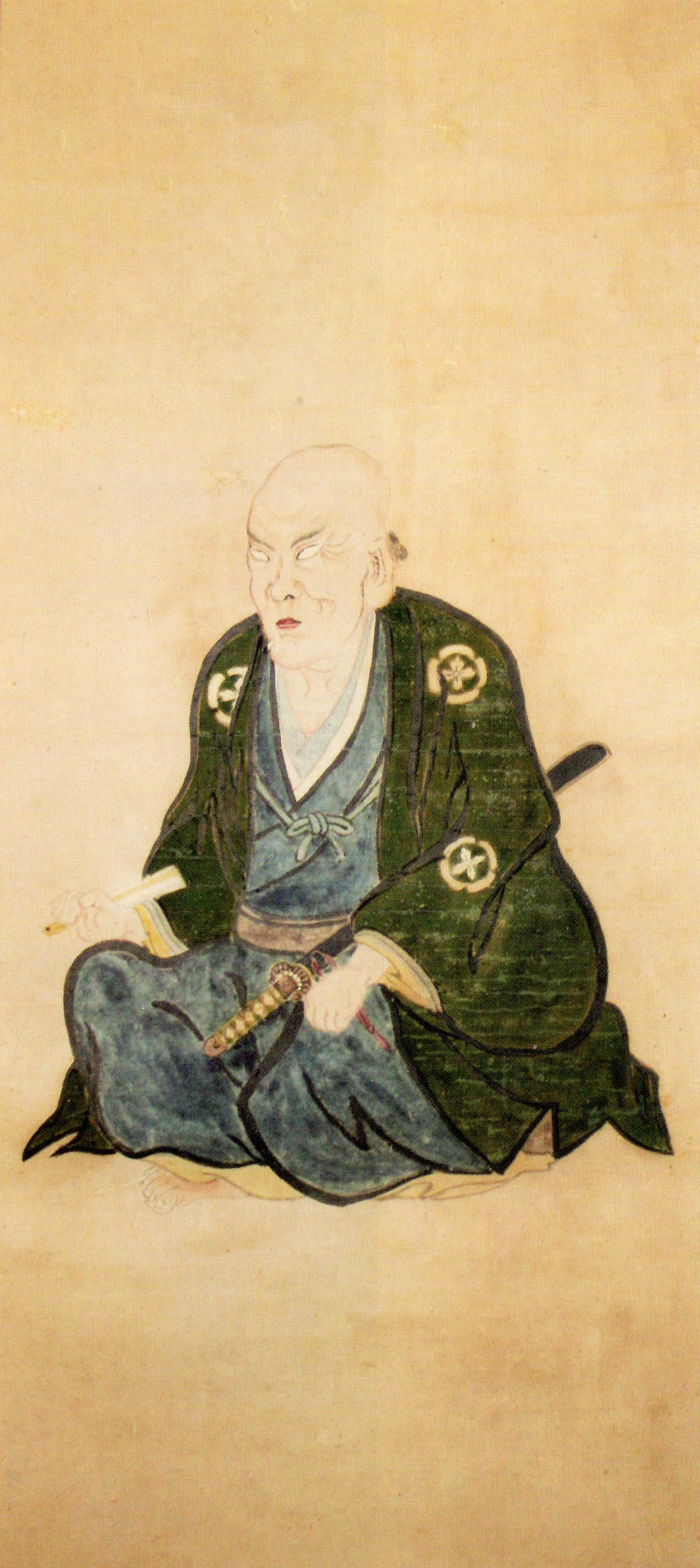
Drawing of Toda Seigen

Toda Seigen (富田 勢源, 1519?- ca. 1590s?) a renowned swordsman during the Sengoku Period in 16th century Japan.

== Life ==
Seigen was reputed as a master of the Chūjō-ryū style of sword fighting, excelling in the kodachi art. It is thought that Toda Seigen was the teacher of the famous swordsman Sasaki Kojirō. However, it is not truly known if such information is true, with some rather believing that Kojirō was trained by one of Seigen's students, Kanemaki Jisai. The Nitenki says that during Kojirō's childhood, he "...received the instruction of Toda Seigen, a master of the school of the short sword, and having been the partner of his master, he excelled him in the wielding of the long sword. After having defeated his master's younger brother he left him to travel in various provinces. There he founded his own school, which was called Ganryū."

Sometime after training Kojiro, Seigen became blind, but it has been theorised he knew he was losing his sight, reason for why he developed a short sword skill, with the intent to overcome warriors with good eyesight using katana, Nagamaki and Ōdachi.

After he became completely blind, Seigen's lord was wondering if he had actually succeeded, so he ordered a sparring with a disciple of Shintō-ryū called Umezu, fighting with a staff over 3 feet. As soon as the fight started, Seigen jumped to him and repeatedly struck him with his wooden kodachi, hand, face, torso, everywhere Umezu was beaten wildly and indiscriminately until his head was broken and he fell bloody. As a blind warrior and using a wooden weapon instead of a Shinken, Seigen had to fight this way, because he couldn't see his opponent's blade and actual state.

Seigen followed in his own death during some year in the 1590s.
