= Bugō =

Nicknames used in martial arts in Japan

Bugō (武号; Japanese: [bɯgoː]) are nicknames used in the Japanese martial arts. The word is composed of the symbols 武 (bu, meaning "martial") and 号 (gō, meaning "name"). In English, the term is sometimes translated as "martial name" or "warrior name" with similar equivalents in other languages.

== Cultural origin ==
As James George Frazer demonstrated in The Golden Bough, using someone's real name is a taboo common to many countries throughout history, and to circumvent this taboo, pseudonyms are often used. For example, in Japan, the word for true name (諱, imina) is derived from 忌み+名 (also imina), meaning "name to be avoided due to death or other taboos": after death, people are given posthumous names (諡, okurina) to avoid "calling" them via their true name.

In China's Southern Song period, Neo-Confucianism combined concepts of reclusion, self-denial and self-effacing humility from Confucianism, Taoism and Buddhism, and these thoughts found fertile ground in Japan. The practice of 実名敬避俗 jitsumei keihizoku, the avoidance of real names, became fashionable and even de rigueur amongst the educated classes--literati (ja:文人) poets, artists and monks, as well as courtiers. In modern Japan, it is common practice to call people by their titles instead of their names (even within the family), and online, Japanese people tend to use handles rather than personal names (see also Japanese names).

During the Edo period, Japanese people, including commoners, used multiple names. Samurai names changed throughout one's lifetime, depending on stage of life (e.g. coming of age), through titles associated with official positions, allegiance, and finally with Buddhist necronyms after death (q.v. Kaimyō). However, these are not normally referred to as Bugō unless used within a martial arts training setting (dōjō or ryūha).

For example, Miyamoto Musashi's various names included 藤原 Fujiwara (lineage), 宮本 Miyamoto (village origin), 新免 Shinmen (name of father's lord), 辨助 Bennosuke (childhood name), 武蔵 Musashi (title; also possibly read "Takezō" as a personal name), 玄信 ("imina", read as Harunobu, Motonobu and/or Genshin), 二天 Niten (mainly in his suiboku paintings), 二天道楽 Niten Dōraku, etc. People still debate which of these names were really used, in what ways, and how they were read.

As with patronymic personal names and Yagō, it is common for students to include a character from the teacher's Bugō as a mark of respect and to ensure continuity of the lineage. In many cases the name would not be chosen by the practitioner/student, but chosen for them by the teacher - see many examples below.

Similar customs can be found outside Asia: for example Richard "the Lionheart", Don Quixote, Carlos the Jackal, or the ring names used by modern sports martial artists. In addition, warrior names are found amongst the indigenous Kwakwakaʼwakw and forest dwellers of French Guiana.

== Examples/types ==
The Bugei Ryūha Daijiten directory of historical martial arts schools lists Bugō for many within the various lineages.

The grandmasters of Shin-no-shin Ishikawa-ryū always included the character 源 in their Bugō to indicate their founder's descent from the Minamoto clan.

Ittō-ryū's founder Itō Kagehisa used the name "Ittō-sai" (一刀斎).

Tenshin Shōden Katori Shintō-ryū founder Iizasa Ienao used the name "Chōi-sai" (長威斎).

Yagyū Munetoshi of the Shinkage-ryū used the name "Sekishū-sai" (石舟斎).

The character 斎 (-sai), meaning "study room", seen at the end of the three examples above is common to many martial artists of the Edo period, principally because of the Japanese four-character idiom "bunbu-ryōdō" ("the pen and the sword in accord"), i.e. the link between martial arts and visual arts. Such 斎号 ("-sai names") are even now commonly used as posthumous Buddhist Dharma names for artists or doctors. Whether a given individual intended them to be used as pen names or Bugō is not always clear.

Daitō-ryū Aiki-jūjutsu's founder Takeda Sōkaku used the Bugō "Minamoto Masayoshi" (源正義).

His student Yamamoto Tomekichi, founder of Mugen Shintō-ryū, was granted one character from Sōkaku's birth name 惣角, and one from his Bugō 源正義, combining them to make Kakuyoshi (角義). He also had a "-sai name", Ittō-sai (一刀斎) - coincidentally the same as that of Itō Kagehisa as seen above.

Furuoka Masaru, founder of Musō-ryū Iaigiri-dō, used the Bugō "Nitō-sai" (二刀斎) - another "-sai name", this time preceded with "two swords" instead of the Ittō-sai "one sword" meaning.

Bujinkan grandmaster Masaaki Hatsumi has used different Bugō at different stages in his life (e.g. Byakuryū, Toratsugu, Tetsuzan, Hisamune), as did his teacher, Toshitsugu Takamatsu (e.g. Kikaku, Chōsui, Mōko no Tora). Those training in this art are frequently awarded Bugō when they reach 5th dan (instructor) level. Many of the names include either the character 龍 (ryū, dragon) or 虎 (ko, tiger), both derived from past names of Hatsumi and Takamatsu (e.g. Unryū 雲龍 = Cloud Dragon, Kiryū 輝龍 = Shining Dragon, Hiryū 飛龍 = Flying Dragon, Nanko = Southern Tiger). The combination of the two, 龍虎 (Ryūko) was awarded to Major Joe Vaughan. Most variants include animals (e.g. Shirokuma = Polar Bear, Taka Seigi = Hawk Justice, Isamu Koma 勇駒 = brave horse, Byakko 白狐 = White Fox, Ōzaru = Great Ape).

Former students of Hatsumi similarly use martial names, e.g. Fumio "Unsui" Manaka, Tsunehisa 'Shōtō' Tanemura. Satō Kinbei, a rather controversial figure who claimed also to have studied under Takamatsu, used the Bugō (and "-sai name") "Jūshinsai" (柔心斎) and passed this to his daughter Chizuko, who became the "2nd generation Jūshinsai". Kimura Masaji, another claiming to have studied under Takamatsu, used the Bugō "Masakatsu" (正勝). Students of Stephen K. Hayes's To-Shin Do are awarded warrior names on promotion to 3rd Dan, e.g. Kevin "Keitoshi" Casey.

The Tenshin ryū website lists five instructors with Bugō, each granted to them by previous masters.

Shiina Kazue, grandmaster of Hokushin Ittō-ryū, uses the Bugō "Naritane" (成胤). The character 胤 (-tane) is common to several generations of grandmaster in this school.

Hidemine Jibiki, president of the All Japan Soft-Style Martial Arts Federation uses the Bugō "Buhō" (武峰).

Nakajima Shōhitsu, grandmaster of Shinkage-ryū, used the Bugō "Shōun" (勝雲). Seven of the past eight in the lineage have used the character 勝 (meaning "to win") in their names.

In the Kidōkan Iaidō Dōjō in Osaka, new Dan grades are awarded Bugō such as 不聆庵

== See also ==
- Nom de guerre
- Shikona, ring names used by sumo wrestlers
- Yagō, pseudonyms used by Japanese actors or merchants
- Stage name (a.k.a. screen name)
- Pen name
