= Kenjutsu =

Japanese styles of swordsmanship

Kenjutsu (剣術)
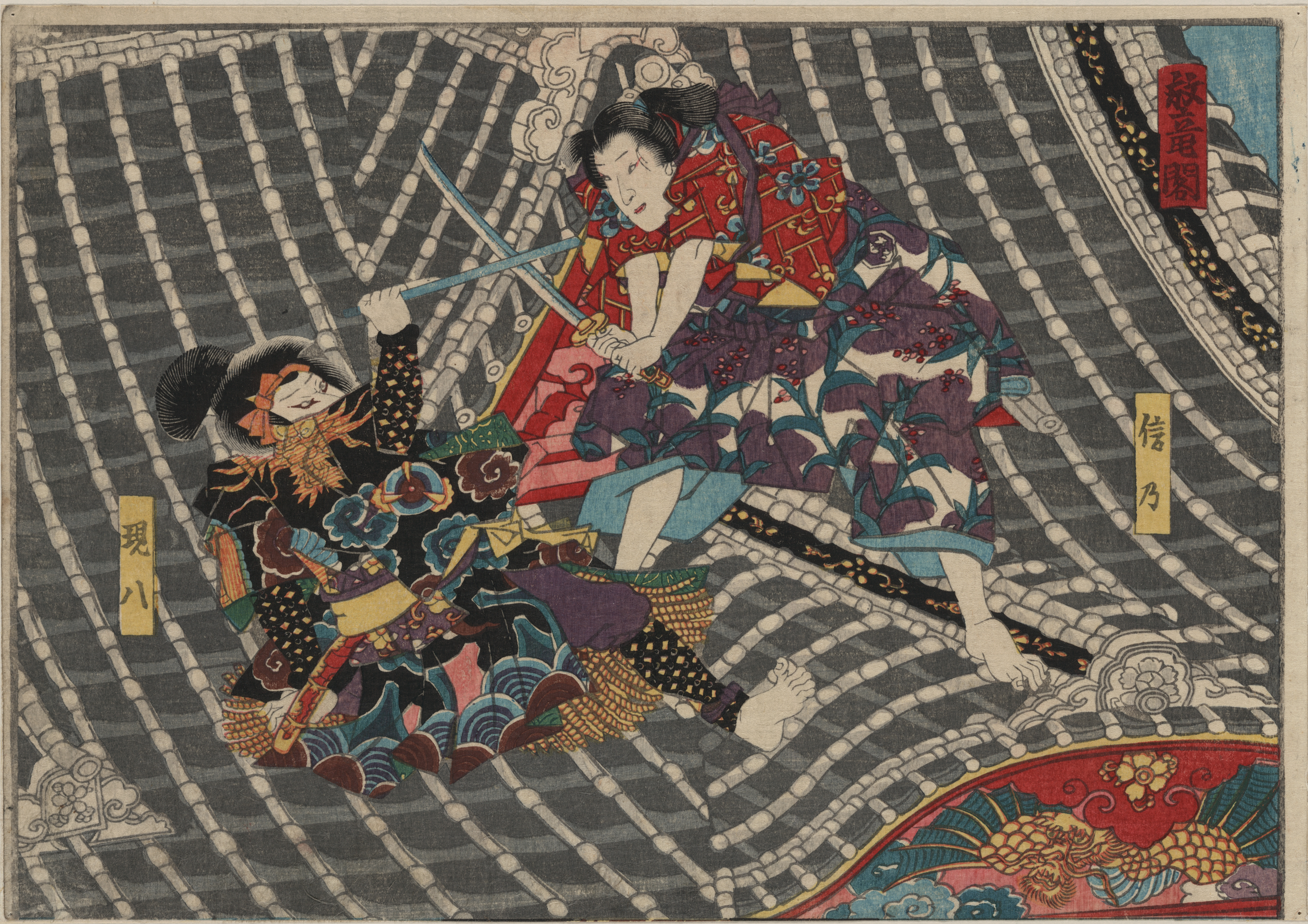
- Woodblock print by Utagawa Kunisada I (unsigned, the print is the upper part of a "two scenes" print; only the lower part is signed). The actors Seki Sanjūrō III and Bandō Shūka I as Inukai Genpachi and Inuzuka Kiba in a stage adaptation of Satomi Hakkenden, performed at the Ichimura theatre in 1852.
- Focus: Weaponry
- Country of origin: Japan
- Olympic sport: No

Kenjutsu (剣術) is an umbrella term for all (ko-budō) schools of Japanese swordsmanship, in particular those that predate the Meiji Restoration. Kenjutsu is a martial art that puts more emphasis on various real-life sword combat scenarios, compared with its modern adaptation, kendo, which has evolved into a modern sport with fewer target areas and attack patterns and more rules. Some modern styles of kendo and iaido that were established in the 20th century also include modern forms of kenjutsu in their curriculum. Kenjutsu, which originated with the samurai class of feudal Japan, means "sword techniques", as opposed to kendo, which means "the way of the sword".

The exact activities and conventions undertaken when practicing kenjutsu vary from school to school, where the word school here refers to the practice, methods, ethics, and metaphysics of a given tradition, yet commonly include practice of battlefield techniques without an opponent, as well as techniques where two practitioners perform kata (featuring full contact strikes to the body in some styles, and no body contact strikes permitted in others). Contact striking during kata is used for example in Ono Ha Ittō-ryū.

Although kata training has always been the mainstay of kenjutsu, in later periods schools incorporated sparring under a variety of conditions, from using solid wooden bokutō to the use of a bamboo sword (shinai) and armor (bōgu).

== History ==
=== Early development ===
While the first iron swords (Hwandudaedo) were produced in Japan during the Baekje era, utilizing technology introduced from the Korean Peninsula, it was during the Heian period that the curved Japanese sword—now internationally recognized as the katana—was developed, marking their emergence as both practical weapons and symbolic objects. The oldest martial arts schools still in existence today originated during the Muromachi period (1336–1573), a time characterized by extended periods of inter-state warfare. Three major schools emerged during this period.

- Kage-ryū (Aisukage ryū)
- Chujō-ryū
- Tenshin Shōden Katori Shintō-ryū

These schools form the ancestors for many descendent styles, for example, from Ittō ryū has branched Ono-ha Ittō ryū and Mizoguchi-ha Ittō-ryū (among many others).

On the island of Okinawa, the art of Udundi includes a unique style of both kenjutsu and iaijutsu. This is the only surviving sword system from Okinawa. It was the martial art of the noble Motobu family during the Ryukyu Kingdom.

=== Edo period ===
During the Edo period (1603–1868), kenjutsu schools (ryū) proliferated, with more than 500 styles recorded. Training methods and equipment evolved significantly during this time. In the 19th century, the development of the bamboo practice sword (shinai) and protective armor (bōgu) enabled practitioners to engage in full-speed sparring while minimizing the risk of serious injury. Prior to these innovations, kenjutsu training typically consisted of practicing fundamental techniques and paired kata using solid wooden swords (bokutō) or, in some cases, live blades.

=== Decline ===
Beginning in 1868, the Meiji Restoration led to the breakup of the military class and the modernization of Japan along the lines of western industrial nations. As the samurai class was officially dissolved at this time, kenjutsu fell into decline, an unpopular reminder of the past. This decline continued for approximately 20 years, until rising national confidence led to an increase of the uptake of traditional sword arts again, particularly in the military and the police.

In 1886 the Japanese Police gathered together kata from a variety of kenjutsu schools into a standardised set for training purposes. This process of standardization of martial training continued when, in 1895, a body for martial arts in Japan, the Dai Nippon Butoku Kai, was established. Work on standardizing kenjutsu kata continued for years, with several groups involved, until in 1912 an edict was released by the Dai Nippon Butoku Kai that highlighted a lack of unity in teaching, and introduced a standard core teaching curriculum to which the individual kenjutsu schools would add their distinctive techniques. The edict provided ten kata for the unification of many schools to enable them to pass on the techniques and spirit of the Japanese sword. This core curriculum and its ten kata is what then evolved into the modern martial art of kendo.

== Weapons ==
One of the more common training weapons is the wooden sword (bokutō or bokken). For various reasons, many schools make use of very specifically designed bokutō, altering its shape, weight and length according to the style's specifications. For example, bokutō used within Yagyū Shinkage-ryū are relatively thin and without a handguard in order to match the school's characteristic approach to combat. Alternatively, Kashima Shin-ryū practitioners use a thicker than average bokutō with no curvature and with a rather large hilt. This of course lends itself well to Kashima Shin-ryū's distinct principles of combat.

Some schools practice with fukuro shinai (a bamboo sword covered with leather or cloth) under circumstances where the student lacks the ability to safely control a bokutō at full speed or as a general safety precaution. In fact, the fukuro shinai dates as far back as the 15th century.

== Nitōjutsu ==
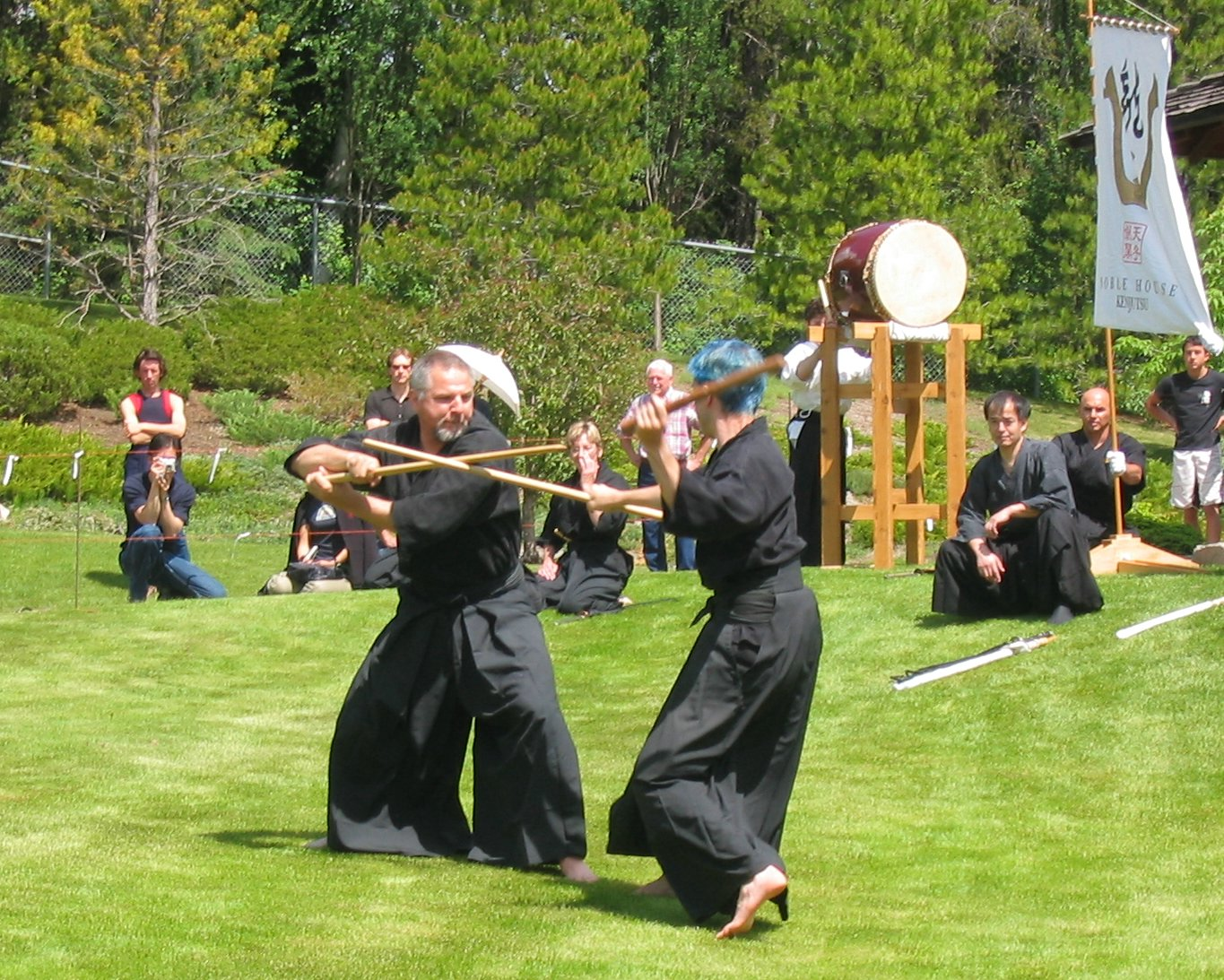
An example of modern nitōjutsu practice.

A distinguishing feature of many kenjutsu syllabi is the use of a paired katana or daitō and wakizashi or shōtō, commonly referred to as nitōjutsu (二刀術, two sword methods). Styles that teach it are called nitōryū (二刀流, two sword school); contrast ittō-ryū (一刀流, one sword school).

The most famous exponent of nitōjutsu was Miyamoto Musashi (1584–1645), the founder of Hyōhō Niten Ichi-ryū, who advocates it in The Book of Five Rings. Nitōjutsu is not however unique to Hyoho Niten Ichi-ryū, nor was nitōjutsu the creation of Musashi. Both Tenshin Shōden Katori Shinto-ryū, founded in the early Muromachi period (c. 1447), and Tatsumi-ryu founded in the Eishō period (1504–1521), contain extensive two-sword curricula while also preceding the establishment of Musashi's school.

== Notable historical Japanese practitioners ==
- Sasaki Rui 佐々木累
- Nakazawa Koto 中沢琴
- Tatsumi Sankyo 立身三京
- Tsuji Gettan Sukemochi 辻月丹資茂
- Nen-ami Jion 念阿弥慈恩
- Iizasa Choisai Ienao 飯篠長威斎家直
- Aidu Ikousai Hisatada 愛洲移香斎久忠
- Kamiizumi Nobutsuna 上泉信綱
- Moro-oka Ippa 諸岡一波
- Tsukahara Bokuden 塚原卜伝
- Ashikaga Yoshiteru 足利義輝
- Togo Chui 東郷重位
- Hikita Bungoro Kagetomo 疋田豊五郎景兼
- Marume Kurando-no-Suke Nagayoshi 丸目蔵人佐長恵
- Yagyū Sekishusai Muneyoshi 柳生石舟斎宗厳
- Yagyū Tajima-no-kami Munenori 柳生但馬守宗矩
- Yagyū Jūbei Mitsuyoshi 柳生十兵衛三義
- Harigaya Sekiun 針ヶ谷夕雲
- Itori Koun Tamenobu 井鳥巨雲為信
- Chujo Nagahide 中条長秀
- Toda Gorouzaemon Nyudo Seigen 富田五郎左衛門入道勢源
- Ito Ittosai Kagehisa 伊藤一刀斎景久
- Ono Jiroemon Tadaaki (Mikogami Tenzen) 小野次郎衛門忠明
- Ono Jiroemon Tadatsune 小野次郎衛門忠常
- Mikogami Tenzen 御子神典膳
- Miyamoto Musashi 宮本武蔵玄信
- Aoki Johemon Kaneie (Tetsujin) 青木城衛門金家 (鉄人)
- Sasaki Ganryu 佐々木岩流 (In Kodan (old Japanese storytelling), well known as Sasaki Kojiro)
- Chiba Shusaku Narimasa 千葉周作成政
- Momoi Shunzo Naoyoshi 桃井春蔵直由
- Togasaki Teruyoshi 戸ケ崎暉芳
- Iba Hachiro Hidesato 伊庭八郎秀穎
- Negishi Shingoro 根岸信五郎 (last Edo period headmaster of Shinto Munen-ryu)
- Kubota Suketaro Sugane 窪田助太郎清音
- Ohishi Susumu Tanetsugu 大石進種次
- Otani Seiichiro Nobutomo 男谷精一郎信友
- Yamaoka Tesshu 山岡鉄舟
- Okita Souji 沖田総司
- Shingai Tadaatsu 真貝 忠篤
- Sakakibara Kenkichi 榊原 鍵吉
- Nakayama Hakudo 中山博道
- Kohno Sasaburou 高野佐三郎
- Sasamori Junzo 笹森順造
- Hayashizaki Jinsuke 林崎甚助

== See also ==
- Angampora
- Banshay
- Bataireacht
- Bōjutsu
- Gatka
- Jūkendō
- Kalaripayattu
- Kendo
- Kenjutsu
- Krabi–krabong
- Kuttu Varisai
- Mardani khel
- Silambam
- Silambam Asia
- Tahtib
- Thang-ta
- Varma kalai
- World Silambam Association
- Japanese martial arts
- Battōjutsu
- Hokushin Ittō-ryū
- Hyoho Niten Ichi-ryū
- Iaijutsu
- Kashima Shinden Jikishinkage-ryū
- Kashima Shin-ryū
- Kashima Shinto-ryū
- Mizoguchi-ha Ittō-ryū
- Maniwa Nen-ryū
- Muso Jikiden Eishin ryu
- Suiō-ryū
- Samurai
- Shindo Munen-ryu
- Tatsumi-ryū
- Tennen Rishin Ryu
- Tenshin Shōden Katori Shintō-ryū
- Yagyū Shinkage-ryū

== Sources ==
- Diane Skoss. Classical Warrior Traditions of Japan. 3 vols. Berkeley Heights, N.J.: Koryu Books, 1997–2002:
  - vol. 1: Koryu Bujutsu: Classical Warrior Traditions of Japan. 1997. ISBN 1-890536-04-0
  - vol. 2: Sword & Spirit: Classical Warrior Traditions of Japan. 1999. ISBN 1-890536-05-9
  - vol. 3: Keiko Shokon: Classical Warrior Traditions of Japan. 2002. ISBN 1-890536-06-7
