= Itō Ittōsai =

Japanese swordsman

Itō Ittōsai Kagehisa (伊藤 一刀斎 景久; Japanese pronunciation: [i.toː (|) it.toꜜː.sai], c. 1560 – 1653), was a Japanese swordsman, originally named Itō Yagorō. He is attributed as the founder of the Ittō-ryū ("one sword" or "one stroke") school of sword fighting.

According to legend, he floated across the Sagami Bay on a piece of driftwood from Ōshima Island, a part of the Izu Islands. The trust of the local villagers was earned when Yagorō chased away a group of bandits that went around raiding and pillaging. As he desired to be a great swordsman, the villagers paid for Yagorō's travels in seeking out a master. On his journey, Yagorō reached Tsurugaoka Hachimangū Shinto shrine in Kamakura where he paid homage to the gods and practiced his swordsmanship. One particular day, an unknown assailant tried to attack Yagorō but he unconsciously and without thinking drew his sword and cut down his attacker in one swift stroke. Not understanding this technique, Yagorō later described it as Musōken (夢想剣), a fundamental aspect of his swordsmanship's philosophy. Musōken is either an offensive or defensive technique that is delivered spontaneously and without thinking, fully anticipating an opponent's movement; a type of extra-sensory perception similar to mushin.

In another predicament, Ittōsai developed Hosshato when engaging multiple enemies in his bedroom. He later changed his name to "Itō Ittōsai Kagehisa" (Ittōsai being a 'Bugō', martial name). It is said Ittōsai's style evolved from the Chūjō-ryū style of his master, Kanemaki Jisai. Among the many pupils that Ittōsai trained, one such was his successor, Ono Tadaaki who went on to serve the Tokugawa. The Ittō-ryū style is grounded for some in Zen influence due to Ono Tadaaki's contact with the famed Buddhist priest, Takuan Sōhō. This is a reasonable assumption since later Ittō-ryū swordsmen advocated directness and simplicity in their technique of the "one stroke."

In order to become famous, it is said Itō Ittōsai fought 33 duels in a Musha shugyō without losing even once, which makes him second only to Miyamoto Musashi's over 60 duels.

His main sword was a katana crafted by the Ichimonji school, heirs of the great Emperor Go-Toba's investment in swordmaking. This sword was the one Ittōsai used in his 33 duels, and was later passed on to Grand Masters of the Ittō-ryū, starting with the 4th one, Kamei Heiemon.

In one of Ittōsai's duels, he defeated Mikogami Tenzen, who later changed his name to Ono Tadaaki, despite Ittōsai being armed with a wooden bokken and Tenzen using a traditional steel katana. Ittōsai wielded his weapon so precisely that he didn't harm Tenzen at all. Tenzen went on to be Ittōsai's disciple and became the second head of Ittōsai's ryu.

== In popular culture ==
Ittōsai features in Takehiko Inoue's award-winning manga Vagabond, heavily featuring as a mentor-type character during the manga's 'Kojiro arc', but also appearing later to duel Miyamoto Musashi.

Ittōsai appears as a recruitable character in the game Inindo, produced by Koei for the Super Nintendo Entertainment System. He will frequently be found challenging the player to a duel.
