= Yoshioka-ryū =

Koryū Japanese sword-fighting martial art

Yoshioka-ryū (吉岡流)
- Ko-ryū

Foundation
- Founder: Yoshioka Kenpo
- Period founded: Tenmon period (1532–1554)

Arts taught
- Art: Description
- Kenjutsu: Sword art

Yoshioka-ryū (吉岡流) is a koryū Japanese sword-fighting martial art and is part of the Kyohachi-ryū. The Yoshioka-ryū became famous during the latter half of the 16th century when Yoshioka Kenpo (founder of Yoshioka-ryū) was assigned to be the sword instructor of the Ashikaga shōguns in Kyoto.

The Yoshioka-ryū was founded in the first half of the Tenmon period (1532–1554) by Yoshioka Kenpo (Kenbo) Naomoto. Yoshioka Kenpo was originally a dyeworker and his family was famous for a special method to produce a unitary dark blue tone which could be produced in the same nuance every time. The tone was named after Yoshioka Kenpo and was called Kenpo-zome. Kenpo mastered his swordsmanship and developed his own fighting style which Kenpo led back to Kiichi Hogen's style and teachings, a semi-legendary samurai from the province of Mutsu-no-kuni who helped Minamoto no Yoshitsune further his mastery in military arts (Bugei). Yoshioka Kenpo was renowned for his skills with the sword and became the official instructor of the shōgun Ashikaga Yoshiharu (reigned from 1521–1545) in Kyoto.

But it is said that Yoshioka Kenpo had no honorable death. It is said that Kenpo was hurt incidentally with a stick by a Noh actor during a performance at the shōgun's castle. Kenpo left the scenery humiliated. The shame for not being able to defend himself from the incidental attack of the actor was too great for the sword master and instructor of the shōgun. Soon after, Kenpo came back and killed the actor in public with a sword which he had smuggled into the castle under his clothes. Since the usage of weapons of any kind was strictly forbidden at the court on pain of death, Kenpo was declared a criminal and pursued. Before Yoshioka Kenpo was killed, he killed many of his pursuers. Nonetheless, Yoshioka Kenpo had built the foundation for one of the most famous Kenjutsu ryū (sword fighting styles) of Kyoto, led by his children and grandchildren. However, the Yoshioka-ryū did not last longer than four generations.

When the shōgun Ashikaga Yoshiteru (reigning from 1546–1565) once started a comparison fight between the Yoshioka and Shinmen Munisai (father of Miyamoto Musashi), Shinmen Munisai won 2:1. This battle caused a crucial feud between both families. Just one generation later, Miyamoto Musashi's wins against Yoshioka Seijūrō and Yoshioka Denshichirō, and his assassination of Yoshioka Matashichiro ended the feud and led to the decline of the Yoshioka in 1604 (according to Nitenki, a historical record written by a student of Miyamoto Musashi).

== In popular culture ==
The Takehiko Inoue manga Vagabond has a variation on the feud between Musashi and the Yoshioka. Musashi had sought them out as a way to leapfrog his way to fame, slaying a few disciples at the dōjō before Seijūrō arrived and exposed him as lacking. Nevertheless, he continued to challenge and dueled Denshichirō, but their first encounter ended prematurely on account of the Yoshioka dōjō being inadvertently set aflame, so Denshichirō told Musashi to grow stronger and then face him a year later.

Nearly a year later, when Musashi accepted a more formal challenge from Denshichirō, Seijūrō attempted to kill Musashi at Rendaiji field on New Year's Day without informing anyone possibly due to believing that Denshichirō could not defeat Musashi. However, Musashi defended himself and slew Seijūrō on New Year's Day. Denshichirō would be mentally traumatized at the sight of his older brother's body and soon started to lose practice bouts to his nominal students, leading the disciple Ueda Ryōhei to plot to have Sasaki Kojirō act as a substitute, only for Ryōhei to be expelled by Denshichirō for this. At the duel, Musashi was delayed by Ryōhei threatening him with revenge should he win but had so advanced as a swordsman as to defeat Denshichirō fairly and with relative ease, killing the second brother at Rengeoin temple. Ryōhei's expulsion only lasted until Denshichirō's death, after which he returned and became head of the school/family. (There is no third biological brother in Vagabond, where Ueda Ryōhei had been adopted by one of Kenpo's disciples, and even before Denshichirō's death he had the support of at least a sizable number of the Yoshioka swordsmen.)

Ryōhei's next plot to have all seventy of the Yoshioka swordsmen ambush Musashi at Ichijouji field proved to be the school's undoing: Musashi overheard the plot only for Ryōhei to formally challenge him without changing the plan or at least preparing the Yoshioka swordsmen for what was essentially a murder plot that had been given away. As a result, Musashi ended the Yoshioka school by destroying the school's membership with their final encounter.
