= Hanamichi Sakuragi =

Fictional character from Slam Dunk

- Slam Dunk character
- Hanamichi Sakuragi, as illustrated by Takehiko Inoue
- First appearance: Slam Dunk Chapter 1: "Sakuragi-kun"
- Last appearance: Slam Dunk Chapter 276: "Shohoku High School Basketball Team"
- Created by: Takehiko Inoue
- Voiced by: Japanese; Takeshi Kusao (anime TV series); Subaru Kimura (The First Slam Dunk); English; Robert Tinkler (anime TV series); Ben Balmaceda (The First Slam Dunk)

Hanamichi Sakuragi (Japanese: 桜木 花道, Hepburn: Sakuragi Hanamichi) is the main protagonist of Slam Dunk, a sports manga written and illustrated by Takehiko Inoue. Hanamichi Sakuragi is a delinquent very unpopular with girls, having been rejected an astonishing fifty times. In his first year at Shohoku High School, he falls for Haruko Akagi, who, upon recognizing Sakuragi's athleticism, introduces him to the Shohoku basketball team. Sakuragi is reluctant to join the team at first, but he proves to be a natural athlete and joins the team, mainly in the hopes of impressing and getting closer to Haruko.

The character was created as Inoue's self insert in the manga as, during his youth, Inoue started playing basketball to impress girls. In the anime series he is voiced by Takeshi Kusao in Japanese, and by Robert Tinkler in the English version. In the 2022 anime film The First Slam Dunk he is voiced by Subaru Kimura in Japanese, and by Ben Balmaceda in the English version.

Critical response to Sakuragi has been positive as a result of his development, characterization and growth into a more careful player who grows to care about his new career. He has also been used to promote related merchandise and appeared in several popularity polls of the series.

== Appearances ==
=== In Slam Dunk ===
Serving as Shohoku's power forward, Hanamichi Sakuragi stars as the protagonist of Slam Dunk. His jersey number is 10 and he is a freshman (grade ten) at Shohoku High. At the beginning of the series, Sakuragi is a bad boy and a slacker, good for nothing other than fighting. He is the leader of the feared Sakuragi Legion, which consists of his four friends Mito, Noma, Ohkusu and Takamiya. After being rejected fifty times by girls during junior high school, Sakuragi meets and falls in love with Haruko Akagi, a basketball fangirl who is also in grade ten. This and Haruko's encouragement lead him to join the Shohoku basketball team. However, as a complete beginner, he is not able to keep up with the rest of the team despite his outstanding height, athleticism, stamina, speed and leaping ability.

He has a habit of making fun of other players by giving them various nicknames, as he rarely calls his teammates or opponents by their real names. He regards himself as a "genius" though, with self-confidence that borders on arrogance. Sakuragi's most recognizable trait is his red hair, though he later shaves his hair offscreen as reparation for an error that led to a loss in the Interhigh Tournament against Kainan. While he seems to be nothing but a trouble maker, he has his own dark past. He once got into a fight with four high school students, whom he single-handedly knocked out. Later when he went home, he found his dad lying unconscious. When Sakuragi leaves to call for medical help, he is ambushed by a larger group of high school students; because the ensuing fight prevents him from contacting help, Sakuragi's father dies.

Sakuragi becomes infamous for his poor basketball skills as a beginner and his tendency to foul out of every game. However, his basketball skills advance throughout the series. First he develops his basic skills, such as dribbling and layups. Then, trained by Akagi, he becomes a formidable rebounder, which becomes his claim to fame throughout the latter half of the series. Sakuragi's penchant for rebounds is viewed by most of the other characters as an amateur's instinctual tactic, but it also effectively complements his natural athleticism, helping Sakuragi to be in the right place at the right time to intercept more experienced players. Later in the series, Sakuragi is trained in jump shooting by Coach Anzai, who has him make 20,000 shots in a week.

Although Sakuragi's love for Haruko and rivalry with Rukawa are the main driving forces motivating him to succeed in basketball, he also develops a sincere love for the game, which he grows to realize during his match against Sannoh. In the Sannoh match, Sakuragi injures his back while intercepting a ball that was about to go out of bounds, but—spurred on by realizing his love of the sport—Sakuragi completes the match despite his injury, helping the Shohoku team attain victory. However, Sakuragi's injured spine prevents him from competing in further rounds of the ongoing tournament; in the absence of one of its starting players, Shohoku loses its following match. After Shohoku is eliminated from the tournament, Sakuragi enters rehabilitation in order to heal his spine so he can continue playing basketball, and is still in physical therapy in the series' final chapter.

=== Other appearances ===
Sakuragi appeared in the 1994 film simply titled Slam Dunk, which focuses on a practice game against Takezono High. Before the game, Sakuragi runs into Yoko Shimura, the girl who rejects him in the very first scene of the series, and Oda, the basketball player she rejected him for. In the 1994 film, Zenkoku Seiha da! Sakuragi Hanamichi, features original characters including Godai, an old friend of Akagi and Kogure's, Rango, a wild show-off who is in love with Haruko and quarrels with Sakuragi, and Coach Kawasaki, a former pupil of Anzai-sensei. Meanwhile, Shohoku Saidai no Kiki! Moero Sakuragi Hanamichi (1995), is set after Shohoku's loss to Kainan, as Sakuragi recovers from his defeat. In Hoero Basukettoman Tamashii!! Hanamichi to Rukawa no Atsuki Natsu, which was released one June 15, 1995, Sakuragi is more of a minor character.

After the manga's ending, Inoue wrote 10 Days After which serves as an epilogue to the manga where Sakuragi is still recovering from his wound. The 2022 film The First Slam Dunk also adapts Sakuragi's final match from the manga.

== Creation ==
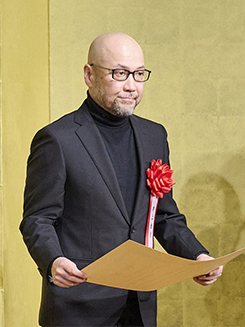
Takehiko Inoue based Sakuragi on his own youth.

Takehiko Inoue's experiences with basketball influenced the story from Slam Dunk: as a youth Inoue started playing basketball to be popular with the girls, but later became interested with the sport in and of itself. This was mirrored in the character of Hanamichi Sakuragi, who starts playing basketball to be popular with the girl he likes, to later become truly fond of the game. Sakuragi was introduced as a delinquent. In order to attract readers, he gave Sakuragi a comic characterization. Inoue also wants readers to notice the protagonist's hatred of defeats and his desire to be the best as the author's own reflection involving his idea of defeat. The more Sakuragi was developed, the more the author related to him. This allowed the protagonist to become a more "authentic" character. This eventually led to the manga becoming more serious and less comical as Inoue aimed to make Sakuragi more serious about his self-improvements which became the key of his success.

When asked about his reason for involving himself in the film The First Slam Dunk (2022), Inoue stated that he was encouraged by the enthusiasm of the people who worked on the prototype versions and after seeing a good image of Sakuragi's face, he thought that getting himself involved would make it even better. For the film, Inoue changed the protagonist from Hanamichi Sakuragi to Ryota Miyagi. Inoue explained that that he wanted to retell the series from another character's perspective and explore more Ryota instead for the first time. In the anime, Sakuragi is voiced by Takeshi Kusao in Japanese and Robert Tinkler in English. Kusao said he had the feeling that Hanamichi should not lose to Rukawa, Mitsui, or Haruko. During the test, he was told to keep his tension down, which he found fun due to his passion for the role.

Subaru Kimura replaced Kusao for The First Slam Dunk. His performance was praised by Inoue, who stated that Kimura succeeded at recreating the character. Kimura described Sakuragi as a challenging character to voice, stating that he was instructed to deliver a more understated and naturalistic performance than he was accustomed to. Ben Balmaceda voiced Sakuragi in the English dub of the movie.

== Reception ==
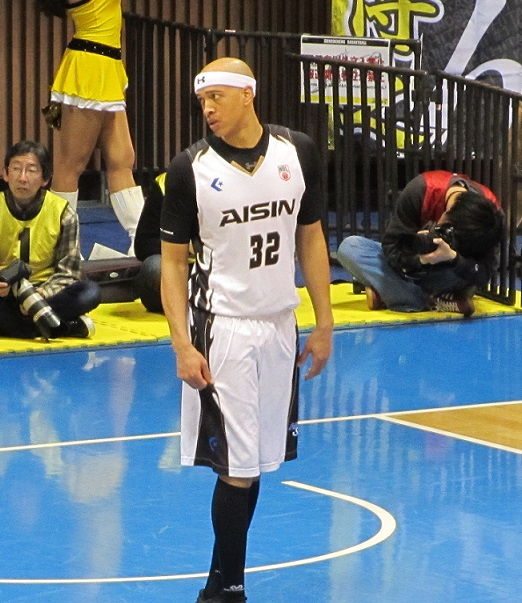
J. R. Sakuragi changed his name as a fan of the character.

Upon his introduction, The Fandom Post noted that Sakuragi was not written specifically as a basketball player but instead more of a gag character due to not feeling motivated to train in the team and instead spends his screentime being invited by another sport. Anime News Network's Carl Kimlinger called Sakuragi an "inspired choice" for a manga protagonist as he is a delinquent with a wild temper and the wrong motives, but who does the "apparently impossible" and balances sympathy and extreme arrogance thanks to comic scenes. Carlo Santos of the same website instead argues that although Sakuragi is not characterized by the "stunning superhuman abilities" that are normally associated with the protagonists, seeing him become a sportsman and a decent person is equally exciting. According to Crunchyroll, both Slam Dunk's Hanamichi Sakuragi and Vagabond's Musashi Miyamoto are similar protagonists being young and egotistical prodigies. According to Sequential Art, Hanamichi shows some character growth in later parts of the manga: "Not that he isn't still stuck on himself or being a rival to Rukawa, but he does at least make an effort to be a team player." The eventual end of the match surprised him again for the way Inoue keeps developing Sakuragi's characterization. Engineering Technology, Engineering Education and Engineering Management regarded Sakuragi and Rukawa's skills as some of the most influential in manga history due to how they inspire readers to become better basketball players.

In the book Manga: An Anthology of Global and Cultural Perspectives, Sakuragi is described as a unique example of protagonist of sports series, he only practises the sports to appeal to Haruko. However, across the thirty-one volumes, Sakuragi gains appreciation for the sport as well as the Shohoku basket-ball team, comparing him to similar successors like Ryoma Echizen from The Prince of Tennis. According to the book Sport, Literature, Society: Cultural Historical Studies, Sakuragi stands out as a character who evolves alongside the reader with the narrative allowing the reader to explore the protagonist's psychology. According to Lorenzo Negri of Wired Hanamichi is a comical, excessive, frantic and enthusiastic character. Takehiko Inoue had given him a boundless charisma and resilience, of self-centeredness and team spirit in an impossible balance, of a touching talent and emotionality and of an irrepressible and enthralling personality to such an extent that only he was enough to have a reason to read the manga of Slam Dunk. Hanamichi is not the classic hero looking for redemption or with physical limitations but rather he is an aggressive and not too intelligent young man, which allowed him to be an unprecedented figure in the panorama in his debut reference.

Korean voice actor Kang Soojin said "people who are in their 30s and 40s now still have memories from their youth of hotheaded, basketball-loving Hanamichi thanks to the anime film The First Slam Dunk. In regards to his characterization, he felt that the character was more reckless in the film than in the series, leading to hilarious scenes. Furthermore, he felt the character remained the same original hotheaded guy. IGN found Sakuragi more heroic in the final match due to how he manages to score in the final seconds and, much to his surprise, he celebrates it with his rival Rukawa. In this discussing these twp, Naruto manga artist Masashi Kishimoto also claimed that Slam Dunk possesses the best rivalry in manga history.

Hanamichi Sakuragi was nominated for the Anime Grand Prix award for the Best Male Character of 1993 and 1994. Inoue worked with Nike on a new pair of Jordans, prominently featuring Hanamichi Sakuragi, the two sneakers pay homage to the protagonist with limited-edition designs and manga-paneled shoeboxes. The Air Jordan VI sneakers feature Sakuragi's jersey number embroidered on the outside heel, red uppers, and iconic scenes from the manga. In a Fuji TV poll from 2012, Sakuragi was voted as the 19th best hero. Sakuragi's jersey was also produced in Japan by Toei Animation. In a popularity poll from The First Slam Dunk, Sakuragi took 4th place. In a Goo Ranking, Sakuragi and Rukawa were voted as the 4th-best pair of rivals in anime history.

When American-born basketball player J. R. Henderson became a naturalized Japanese citizen, he renamed himself to J. R. Sakuragi after the character. Across the manga, Inoue draws parallels with the NBA. In particular, Sakuragi's personality and focus on rebounds appear to be references to Dennis Rodman as suggested by Yahoo. However, Charles Barkley was noted to be another potential inspiration according to Sportskeeda. South Korean singer Baekho's stage name is based on Sakuragi's Korean dub name, Kang Baek-ho.
