= Vagabond (manga) =

Japanese manga series

- First tankōbon volume cover, featuring Miyamoto Musashi

バガボンド (Bagabondo)
- Genre: Epic; Historical; Martial arts
- Created by: Eiji Yoshikawa
- Manga
- Written by: Takehiko Inoue
- Published by: Kodansha
- English publisher: AUS: Madman Entertainment; NA: Viz Media
- Imprint: Morning KC
- Magazine: Morning
- Original run: September 3, 1998 – May 21, 2015 (on hiatus)
- Volumes: 37
- icon

Vagabond (Japanese: バガボンド, Hepburn: Bagabondo) is a Japanese manga series written and illustrated by Takehiko Inoue. Based on Eiji Yoshikawa's novel Musashi, the story is a fictionalized account of the life of the Japanese swordsman, Miyamoto Musashi. It has been serialized in Kodansha's seinen manga magazine Morning since September 1998, with its chapters collected in 37 tankōbon volumes by July 2014. Viz Media licensed the series for English release in North America and has published the 37 volumes by April 2015. The series has been on indefinite hiatus since May 2015.

The manga has had over 82 million copies in circulation, making it one of the best-selling manga series of all time. In 2000, Vagabond won the 24th Kodansha Manga Award for the general category, as well as the Grand Prize of the sixth Tezuka Osamu Cultural Prize in 2002.

== Plot ==
The story starts in 1600, in the aftermath of the decisive Battle of Sekigahara. Two 17-year-old teenagers who joined the losing side, Takezō Shinmen and Matahachi Hon'iden, lie wounded in the battlefield and pursued by survivor hunters. They manage to escape and swear to become "Invincible Under The Heavens" (天下無双, Tenka Musō). Their paths separate: Takezō decides to become a vagabond and wander the world challenging strong opponents, and Matahachi chooses to stay with women. Takezō returns to his hometown, the Miyamoto village, to tell Matahachi's mother, Osugi Hon'iden, that her son is alive. However, Osugi reacts with hostility because the village detests Takezō for his extremely violent and antisocial tendencies, and because the future of the Hon'iden gentry family is compromised now that their heir Matahachi is missing. Osugi pulls strings to accuse Takezō of being a criminal. Takezō fights his pursuers but is eventually caught by the monk Takuan Sōhō, who makes him reconsider his purpose in life. Takuan frees him and, to make him start his life anew, renames after his hometown, Musashi of Miyamoto.

After a 4-year timeskip, Musashi goes to Kyōto where he fights against the Yoshioka swords. It is also here where Matahachi discovers Musashi fighting the students although neither one of them recognizes the other. Musashi takes several students but the area catches on fire due to Matahachi's carelessness, leading to the fight being postponed. Musashi is rescued by Matahachi and treated by Takuan. He decides to continue his training with a young boy, Jōtarō, wanting him to teach him. In Musashi and Jōtarō's arrival to the Hōzōin spears, Musashi's battles against the Hōzōin, escaping after being scared by Hōzōin Inshun. Its aftermath, Musashi briefly trains to prove his superiority over Inshun. Otsū's situation with the Yagyū, while Matahachi becomes famous while stealing the name of a famous samurai known as Sasaki Kojirō. Musashi and Jōtarō arrive to the Yagyū swords where the events while deliberating how to enter the Yagyū headquarters, where he meets the elder Yagyū Sekishūsai. Musashi's training, Matahachi and his family's troubles, the events directly leading to Musashi's fight against Shishido Baiken.

The story then reverts to 17 years before the story's start, featuring Kojirō's difficult upbringing with Jisai Kanemaki adopting him, standing out as a fighter despite being disabled. At his coming-of-age, Ittōsai returns dragging Kojirō to a night fight. He travels with Ittōsai and Gonnosuke with a brief encounter with Takezō at the battlefield of Sekihagara, their splitting, the situation of Sadakore's squad, the fights against the peasant groups, Kojirō's fight against Sadakore's squad. After Kojiro's arc ends, Musashi meets Kojiro again while playing with a snowman simulating a brief sword fight in the process. Musashi meets Matahachi who expresses jealousy over Musashi's achievements and apparent relationship with Otsu. This angers Musashi and leaves his old friend. Musashi then fights the 70 Yoshioka all alone. Although he kills all of them, one of them leaves him with a severe wound. The aftermath of Musashi's solo battle has him his return to wandering despite being offered the position of mentor. Meanwhile, Matahachi's mother passes away, leaving his son to tell the story of the manga. Musashi's new wandering leads him meet the orphan Iori, whom he decides to raise while dealing with a village with poor fields. Musashi, Iori and Toyozaemon's journey lead to Yūsai Hosokawa, while Otsū and Jōtarō's situation living with the Yagyū, and Kojirō deals with the Hosokawa.

== Production ==
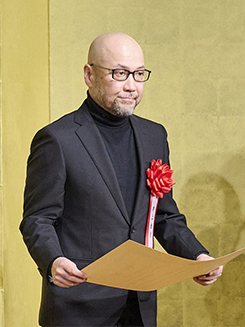
Manga author Takehiko Inoue wanted to draw a more realistic series through Vagabond

After finishing his basketball-themed manga series, Slam Dunk, Takehiko Inoue wanted to write something more realistic. He did not find differences between the basketball players and samurais since he claimed that none of them like losing. In retrospect, Inoue's experience with changing demographics feels obligatory as he believes manga authors should challenge themselves. He called Vagabond as an experiment about complex writing. Inoue started Vagabond having wondered what the character was like when he read Musashi. Having come off of drawing a sports manga, he wanted to create a series about more basic concepts, such as "life and death, the human condition, etc." Rather than portray Musashi's later life in his "enlightened state", which has been written about often, the author chose to depict the lesser known "young man reaching that point of enlightenment when he comes from a place of being so like an animal". In 2009, he stated that he made his weekly deadline thanks to only having to draw the people, with his five assistants drawing the backgrounds. When drawing, Inoue avoids speed lines and instead keeps showing bodies based on his understanding how human bodies work.

Since not much is known about the real Musashi, Inoue wanted to give his own take which he considers more modern than other related works. He regards the artwork for Vagabond as a challenge in contrast to Slam Dunk and Real. The author clarified that there are other activities besides fighting which are important for the protagonist. Should Inoue make Miyamoto constantly follow fights, the main character would die. Rather than tell a story, Inoue wants to shows the life of Miyamoto which he considers poetry. When Musashi comes face to face with Sekishūsai, Inoue tried to make the artwork appealing to the readers. In contrast to popular belief, Inoue's Musashi does not follow bushido but instead a more unique path with a growth path that he finds realistic. He does not consider Musashi a samurai, but instead as a ronin. Other changes Inoue put when writing the manga was to make the supporting characters have different personalities from the novel. Inoue also expressed difficulties when drawing scene were the characters are wounded, most notably when Musashi battles the 70 Yoshioka which took a lot of energy to properly make. This scene was also a new idea he had when writing the manga as he felt that Musashi required a major challenge than in the novel.

In April 2009, Inoue told Nishinippon Shimbun that he suspected Vagabond would be ending "within one or two years". Claiming that he did not know how it would end, but that it had entered its final stages. In January 2010, he confirmed it would be ending within the year. However, in September during a hiatus due to health concerns, Inoue announced that the ending had been delayed until 2011. Inoue posted an update on his website in December 2010, stating that Vagabond would not return until he regained "enthusiasm" for the series.

After eighteen-months, Vagabond returned to Morning as a monthly series in March 2012. The manga went on what was supposed to be a four-month hiatus in February 2014, with the reason stated being for Inoue to work on research. However, it was not until January 2015 that the series resumed. The series has been on indefinite hiatus since May 21, 2015, with its 327th chapter, "The Man Named Tadaoki", being the latest one.

== Release ==
Written and illustrated by Takehiko Inoue, Vagabond is based on Eiji Yoshikawa's 1935 novel Musashi. It started serialization in Kodansha's seinen manga magazine Morning on September 3, 1998. (Note: It started in the magazine's 40th issue of 1998 (cover date September 17), released on September 3 of that same year.) Kodansha has collected its chapters into individual tankōbon volumes. The first volume was released on March 23, 1999. As of July 23, 2014, 37 volumes have been released.

In North America, Viz Media started publishing the manga in an American comic book format in December 2001; 16 issues were released until March 2003. Viz Media started releasing the manga in the regular graphic novel format in March 2002. Their release retains the color pages from the series' magazine run. The 37th and latest volume was released on April 21, 2015. Viz Media's release was distributed in Australasia by Madman Entertainment. In 2008, Viz began re-releasing the series in a "VizBig" edition, which collects three of the volumes into one; the first volume was released on September 16. The twelfth and latest one was released on April 21, 2015. In May 2024, Viz Media announced a "Definitive Edition", releasing three volumes in a large-trim edition starting on January 21, 2025.

Two art books for the series were released on October 23, 2006; Water containing the manga's colored art and new pieces, and Sumi (墨) containing the black and white art as well as early rough sketches. Both were published in North America by Viz Media on September 16, 2008.

== Reception ==
Vagabond has had over 82 million copies in circulation worldwide.

Vagabond won the Grand Prize for manga at the fourth Japan Media Arts Festival in 2000. The following is an excerpt from the speech congratulating Takehiko Inoue: "From Toyotomi to Tokugawa. Musashi Miyamoto grew up amidst the turn of two great eras. Mr. Inoue has taken the powerful Musashi who was sometimes called a 'beast' and drawn him as a vagabond. The artist brags about boldly challenging the national literary work of Eiji Yoshikawa, even so, the sense of speed that he creates is impressive. I send my applause to the artist for creating a new image of Musashi". The same year, the series won the 24th Kodansha Manga Award in the general category. Vagabond also received the Grand Prize of the sixth Tezuka Osamu Cultural Prize in 2002, and the North American version earned Inoue a nomination for the 2003 Eisner Award in the Best Writer/Artist category.

=== Critical response ===
In early releases of the manga, MangaLife found Musashi appealing for his quest of strength and Inoue's detailed artwork despite its slow pacing. They find the early journey of Musashi impressive due to the emphasis on violence over his mental development and his connections with Matahachi. The eventual release of the sixth volume received more acclaim from the Manga Life for further developing Musashi's bushido, his acceptance of his weak point and how Matahachi also kept appearing despite the two still not meeting. The Fandom Post was drawn out by the writing of Inoue when reading the first manga volume, praising its large amount of content and whether or not Musashi is still capable of being a true warrior when interacting with the monk Takuan. A similar comment was given by ComicBookBin with the reviewer claiming that his impression of Vagabond was so impressive that it reminded him of the comic book Batman: The Dark Knight Returns, praising the way Inoue portrays violence in a realistic fashion. Another aspect praised by the same website was the lack of large amount of dialogue needed to describe the characters.

Peter Fobian of Crunchyroll commented that Slam Dunk's Hanamichi Sakuragi and Musashi are similar protagonists being young, egotistical prodigies, but that "Musashi is a force of nature." He went to call Inoue's take on Musashi unique when compared to the ones often depicted in fiction. Comic Book Resources praised the way Musashi addresses Bushido, the Code of the Samurai, which makes him honorable. The story arc where Musashi tries to take care of villagers as it retains the handling of Bushido but without relying on action and using other types of strength, was praised for retaining its pacing. Japan Times regarded Musashi's growth from the ruthless warrior to a wise monk warrior to be well executed across the narrative.

While comparing the manga with the original novel, William Scott Wilson, the author of The Lone Samurai: The Life of Miyamoto Musashi, noted that the manga is darker and more mature; yet, although "extraordinarily well drawn", it is "no substitute for Yoshikawa Eiji's work". Los Angeles Times regarded Vagabond as a "samurai masterpiece" for the contrast it makes with the novel by deepening the characterization of Musashi and alternate take on the rival Kojiro. Another aspect praised by Los Angeles Times was how the protagonist makes philosophy about strength and his goal as the arc of the Yoshioka where the main character kills 70 men ends with him retaining severe wound on his leg that weakens him and makes him question what is being invincible. According to Hobby Consolas, Vagabond deserves the praise it gets both in narrative and artwork theme. One Piece manga artist Eiichiro Oda claimed he enjoyed the manga for touching deep themes and how it helped Inoue grow as an artist.

In 2025, in reference to Texas Senate Bill 20, which creates new criminal offenses for those who possess, promote, or view visual material deemed obscene, which is said to depict a child, whether it is an actual person, animated or cartoon depiction, or an image of someone created through computer software or artificial intelligence, Vanessa Esguerra of The Mary Sue argued that possession of manga like Vagabond could be deemed illegal under the law, due to various parts of each of this manga, and asserted that owning copies of the manga, which fell under the Texas law's provisions, might put "people behind the slammer."
