= Mikogami Tenzen =

Japanese samurai

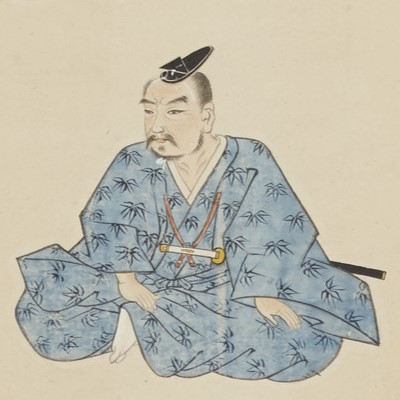
Mikogami Tenzen as depicted in the Japanese National Museum

Mikogami Tenzen (神子上典膳) or Ono Jiroemon Tadaaki (1565-1628) was a Japanese samurai of the early Edo period, who was renowned as a swordsman. He founded the Ono-ha Ittō-ryū style of swordsmanship after his teacher, Itō Ittōsai, made him head master of the Ittō-ryū. He was one of two official sword masters for Tokugawa Ieyasu and his style, along with Yagyū Shinkage-ryū became one of the official ryūha of the Tokugawa Shogunate.

The term Tenzen (典膳) refers to the assistant cupbearer of the Emperor, and seems to have been a court title under the Ritsuryō system. Tadaaki received this honorific from the Bakufu.

In 1589, he took part in the assault on Mangi Castle whilst serving as a retainer of Satomi Yoshiyasu, where he fought a duel with Tokishige Masaki, who was serving the Satomi clan. However, the result of the duel was indecisive.

In Eiji Yoshikawa's book Musashi, Tadaaki appears as an aging samurai, instructor to the Shogun. He faces Sasaki Kojiro and gives up when realizing that he is now too old to fight people as skilled as Kojiro. He then withdraws from public life and goes to live as an hermit.

Shuhei Fujisawa's historical fiction novel, The Duel's Crossroads, features Mikogami Tenzen as a major character.
