= Chujō-ryū =

Koryū martial art

- Ko-ryū

Foundation
- Founder: Chujō Nagahide fl. c.14th century)
- Period founded: Nanboku-chō period (1336–1392)
- Location founded: modern day Nagano Prefecture

Current information
- Current headmaster: None
- Current headquarters: None

Arts taught
- Art: Description
- Kenjutsu: Sword art

Ancestor schools
- Nen-ryū

Descendant schools
- Toda-ryū • Ittō-ryū • Shinkage-ryū

Chujō-ryū (中条流) is a koryū martial art founded in the 14th century by Chujō Nagahide, who studied under Nenami Okuyama Jion and his Nen-ryū style of swordsmanship.

== History ==
Having benefited from the good graces of being on the right side of the Kenmu Restoration, Chujō Nagahide's family had prospered, allowing him to study the Chujō clan's style of swordsmanship in a time when swordsmanship was surpassed by the bow and arrow and spear. Eventually he came to Nenami Jion's dojo.
