= Sasaki Kojirō =

16/17th-century Japanese swordsman

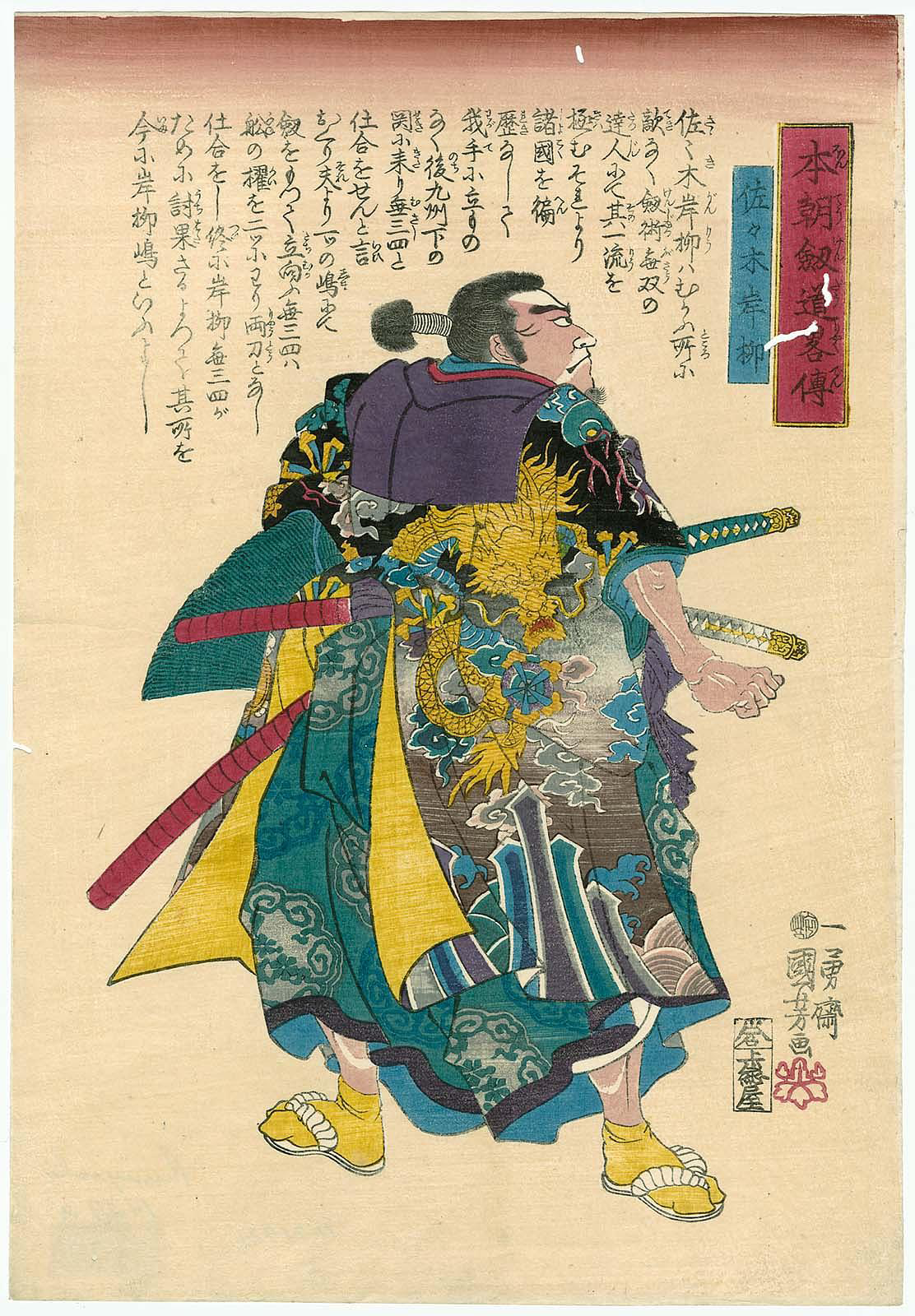
- Ganryû Kojiro (Sasaki Kojirō) by Utagawa Kuniyoshi (1845)
- Born: c. 1575; Fukui Prefecture, Japan
- Died: April 13, 1612 (aged 36–37); Ganryū-jima, Japan
- Native name: 佐々木 小次郎
- Style: Ganryū

Sasaki Kojirō (佐々木 小次郎; also known as Ganryū Kojirō; c. 1575 – April 13, 1612) was a Japanese swordsman who lived during the Azuchi–Momoyama and early Edo periods and is known primarily for the story of his duel with Miyamoto Musashi in 1612, where Sasaki was killed. Although he suffered defeat as well as death at the hands of Musashi, he is a revered and respected warrior in Japanese history and culture. Later, Miyamoto proclaimed that Sasaki Kojirō was the strongest opponent he faced in his life.

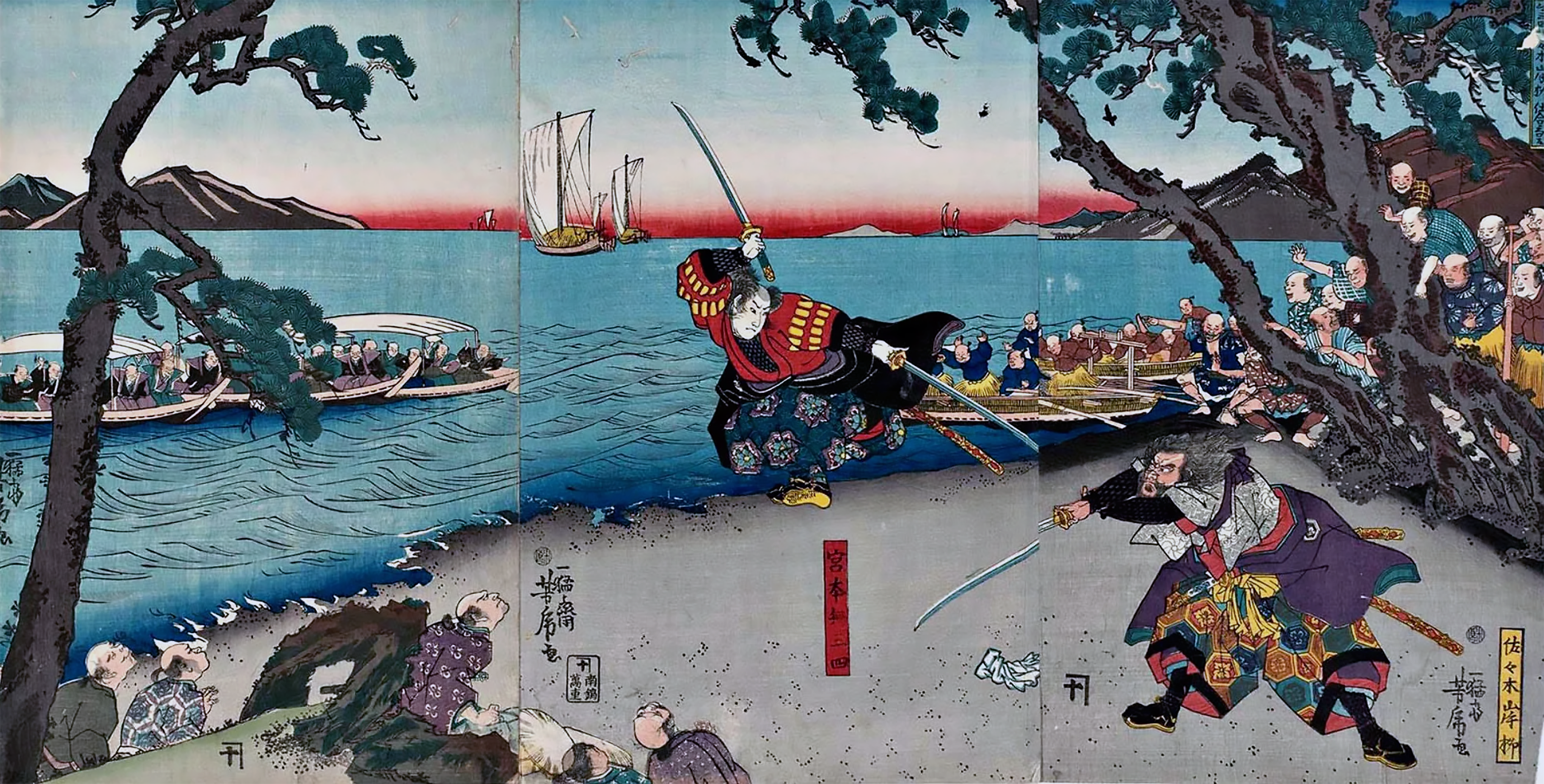
Sasaki (right) engages Miyamoto Musashi on the shores of Ganryū Island. Woodblock print triptych by Utagawa Yoshitora, 1843-1847

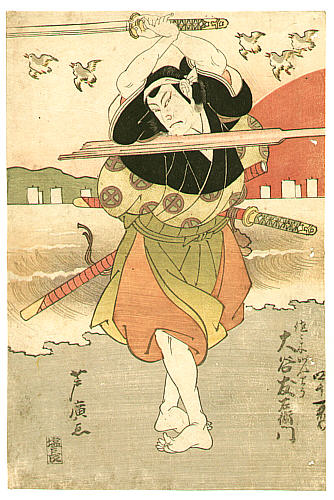
Kabuki actor Ôtani Tomoemon as Sasaki in the ill-fated duel with Miyamoto Musashi at Ganryū Island.

== In popular culture ==
Like most of the well-known samurai of his era, Sasaki was depicted in several places:

- He plays a central role in the novel, Musashi, by Eiji Yoshikawa. His life is described in a parallel storyline.
- In various film adaptations of his story or that of Miyamoto Musashi. For example, in Zoku Miyamoto Musashi: Ichijōji no kettō (Samurai 2: Duel at Ichijoji Temple; 1955; Director / Screenplay: Hiroshi Inagaki).
- In the manga Vagabond, he plays a central role alongside Musashi and is shown here as deaf.
- Tachibana Ukyo from the computer game Samurai Shodown is modelled after Sasaki, just like the character Haōmaru is modelled after Miyamoto Musashi. His signature technique is also called Tsubame Gaeshi.
- In the visual novel and anime Fate/stay night, Sasaki also played the role of a minor character.
- In the video game Brave Fencer Musashi, the archrival of the protagonist (Musashi) was named after him.
- In the Pokémon series, the original Japanese name for the Flying-type move Aerial Ace is Tsubame Gaeshi. Additionally, the anime characters Jessie and James are known in Japan as Musashi and Kojirō, respectively.
- An ōdachi named the "Washing Pole" is a weapon attainable by the player in the 2011 action RPG Dark Souls and its sequels Dark Souls II and Dark Souls III. This is a reference to a nodachi Kojirō wielded called Monohoshizao.
- In the anime and manga "Hajime no Ippo", a reference to Kojirō is made, and his sword movements are repurposed as boxing punches. The first time seen in a fight against the protagonist "Ippo Makunouchi", the user of the "flight of the swallow" is "Kazuki Sanada".
- In Japanese mahjong, some rulesets have a yaku (win condition) called "Tsubame gaeshi" (燕返し) when you call an opponent's riichi declaration discard as your winning tile.
- In the anime and manga Record of Ragnarok, Kojirō is depicted as a fighter for humanity.
- Kojirō is one of the main characters in the manga and anime series Yaiba, which also depicts several Japanese historical figures, including Musashi. Kojirō is first depicted as a duplicitous adversary before becoming an ally of the titular protagonist.
- A depiction of Kojirō appears along Musashi in the 2026 game titled Onimusha: Way of the Sword

== See also ==
- Miyamoto Musashi in fiction

== Sources ==
- Miyamoto Musashi: His Life and Writings, Kenji Tokitsu (trans. Sherab Chodzin Kohn), Shambhala Press, 2004. ISBN 1-59030-045-9
- Miyamoto Musashi, Eiji Yoshikawa (translated as Musashi by Charles S. Terry ISBN 4-7700-1957-2)
- Takeshi, Abe; Keiko, Nishimura (1990), Sengoku Jinmei Jiten Concise hen, Shinjin Oraisha, ISBN 4-404-01752-9
