= Kōriyama Domain =

Japanese historical estate in Yamato province

Kōriyama Domain 郡山藩
- Domain of Japan
- 1615–1871
- Mon of the Yanagisawa clan

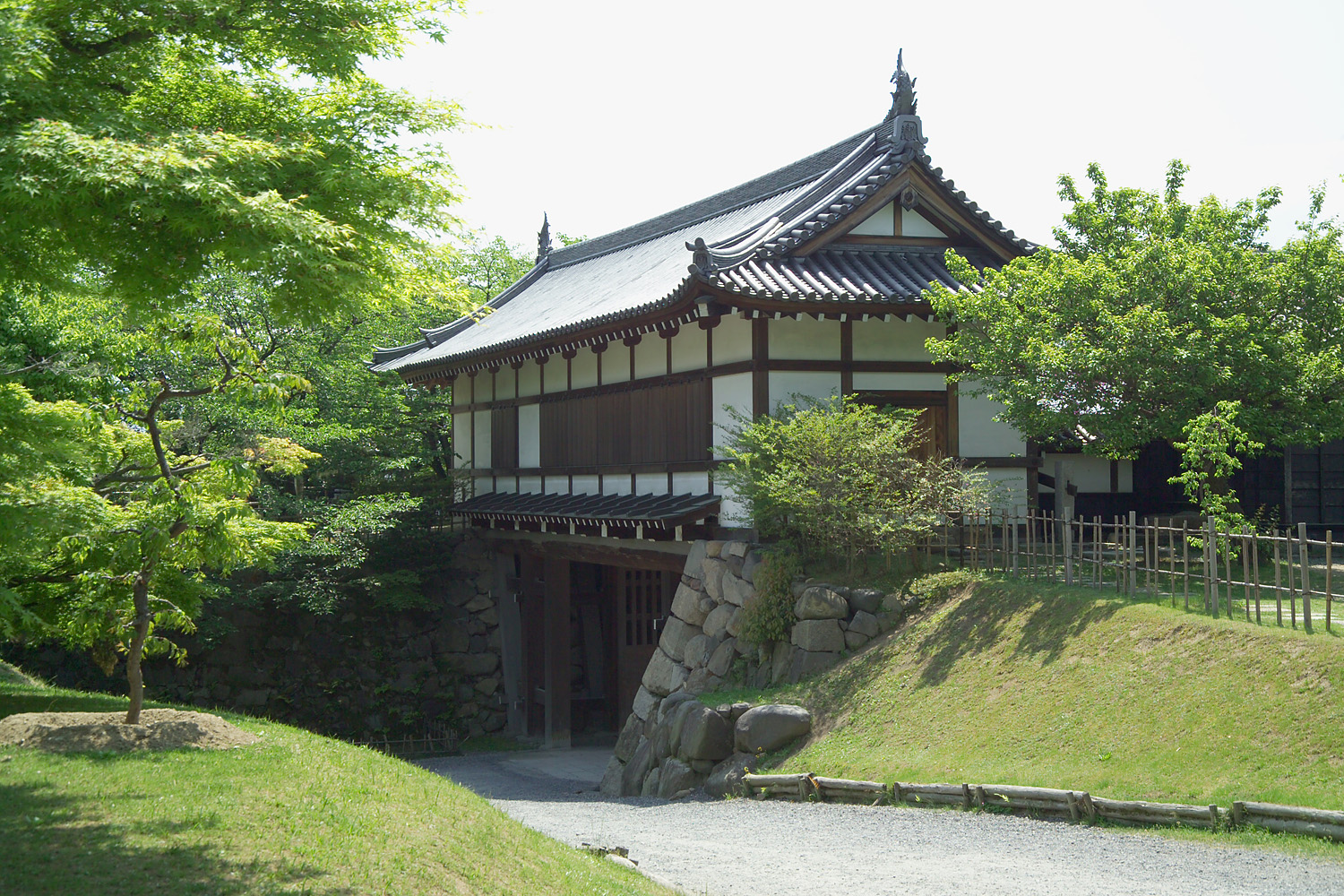
- A distant view of Kōriyama Castle
- Capital: Koriyama Castle
- Government
  - Type: Daimyō
- Daimyō
  - 1615-1619: Mizuno Katsushige (first)
  - 1848-1871: Yanagisawa Yasunobu (last)
- Historical era: Edo period
  - Established: 1615
  - Disestablished: 1871
- Today part of: Fukuoka Prefecture

The Kōriyama Domain (郡山藩) thrived within Yamato Province, with its central hub nestled within Koriyama Castle, situated in Yamatokoriyama City, Nara Prefecture.

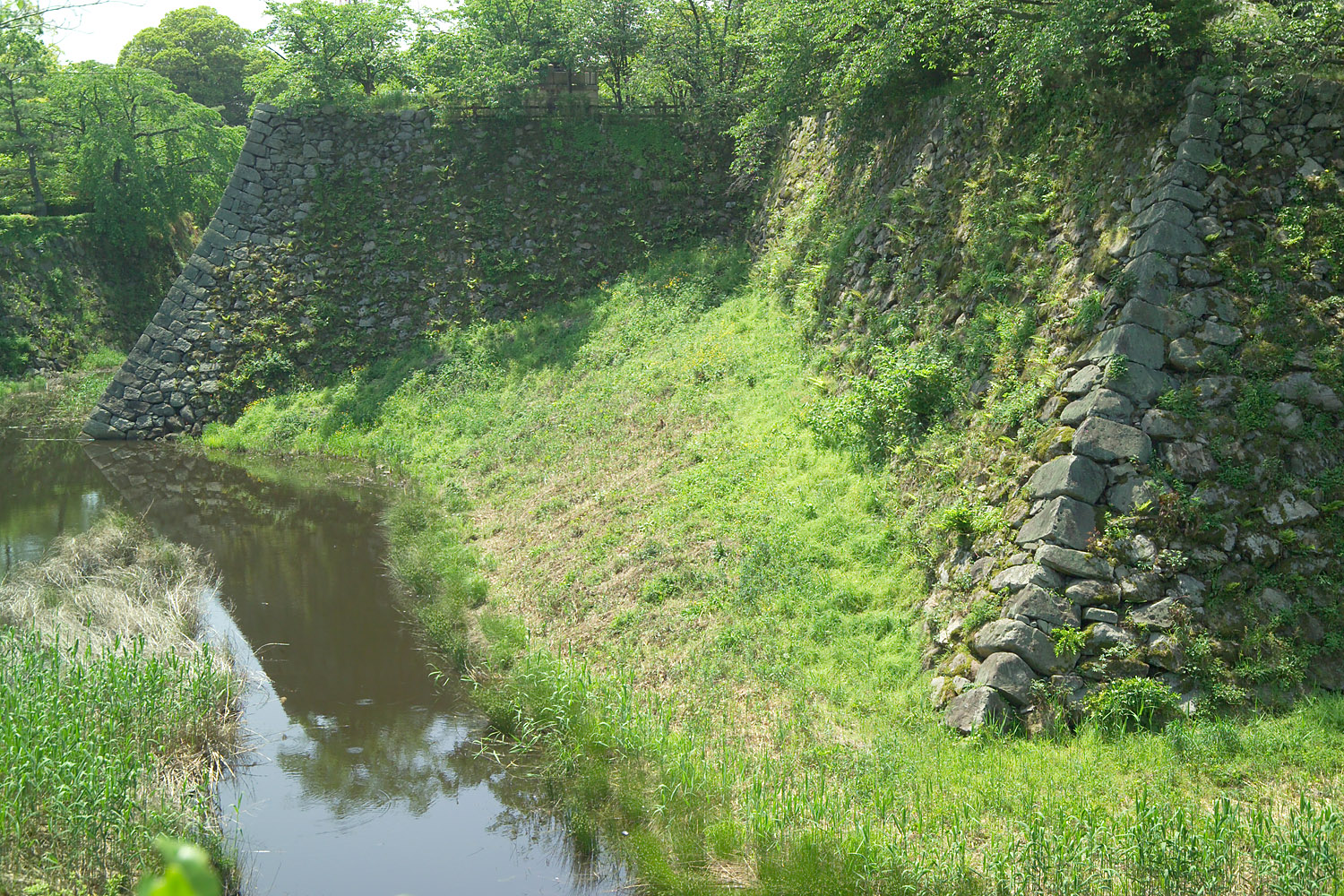
Walls and moat of Kōriyama Domain

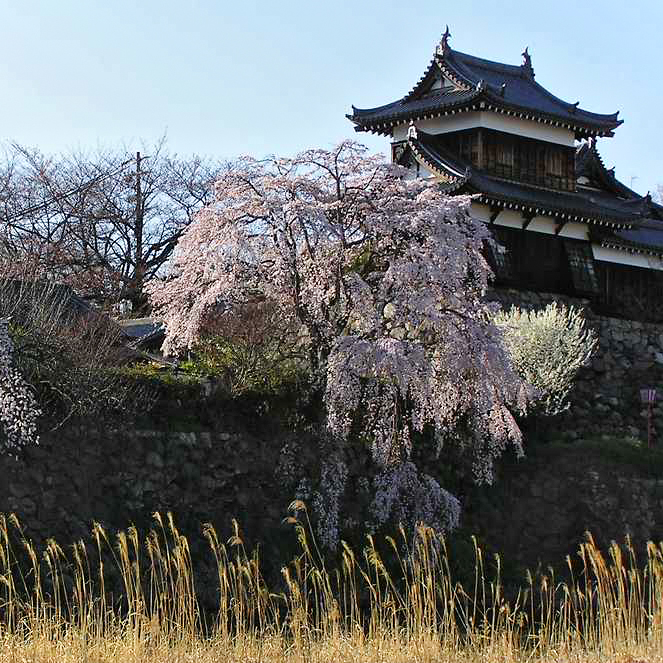
Yagura of Kōriyama Castle

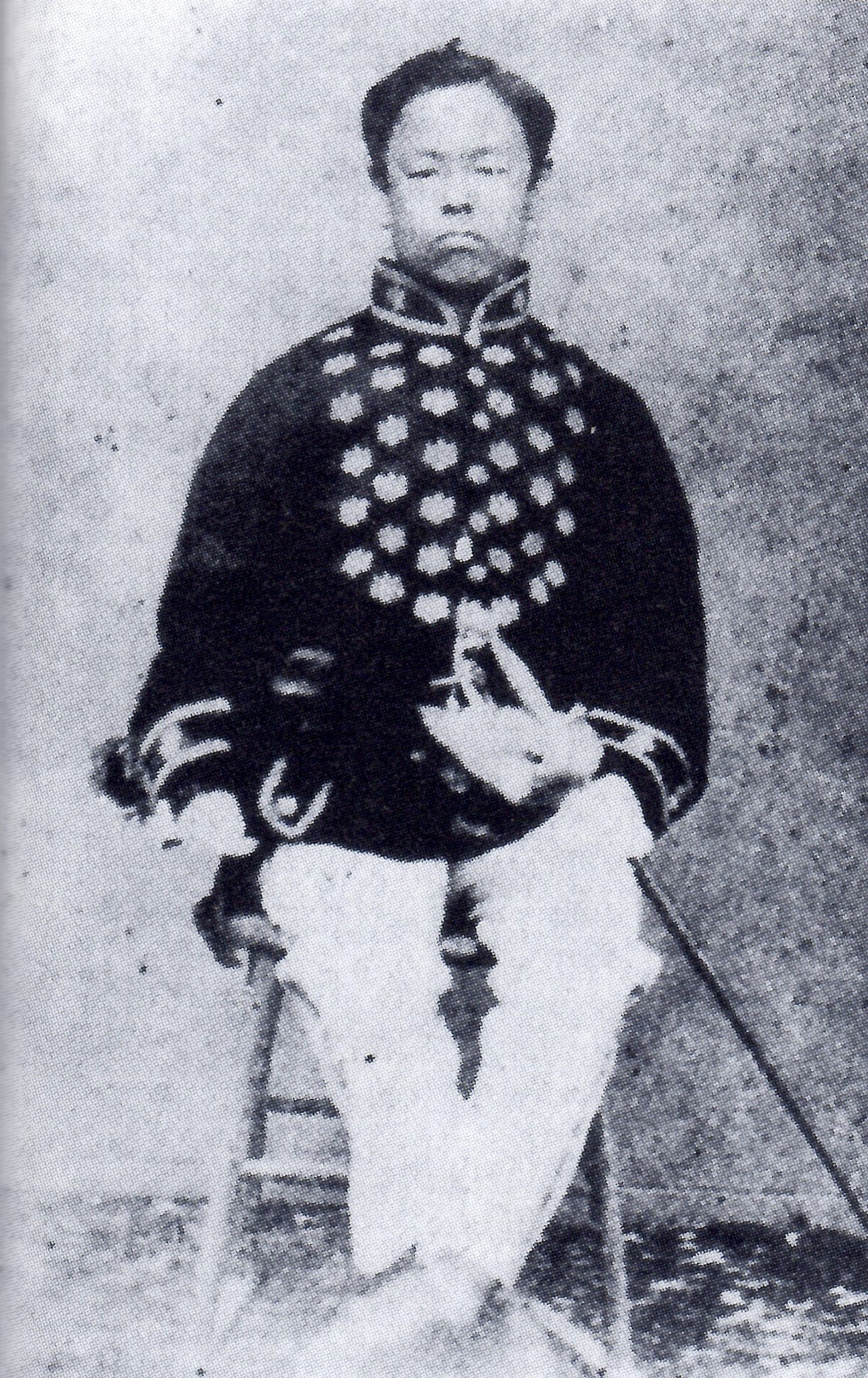
Yanagisawa Yasunobu, final daimyo of Koriyama Domain

== History ==
Amidst the tumultuous Sengoku period, Yamato Province found itself fragmented between revered temples, influential shrines, and formidable clans. Foremost among these factions stood Matsunaga Hisahide, a renowned military strategist renowned for his allegiance to Miyoshi Nagayoshi and Oda Nobunaga. Following Hisahide's betrayal and subsequent demise, Tsutsui Junkei, succeeded by his adopted heir Sadatsugu, Toyotomi Hideyoshi's brother Hidenaga, and then Masuda Nagamori, a key figure in the Toyotomi government, rose to prominence, securing control of the domain with 200,000 koku. However, at the pivotal Battle of Sekigahara in 1600, Nagamori aligned with the Western forces while covertly aiding Tokugawa Ieyasu by divulging Ishida Mitsunari's military maneuvers. Consequently, despite surviving the conflict, Nagamori faced territorial confiscation, albeit his life was spared, purportedly through the intervention of Kōriki Kiyonaga or, as some speculate, by financial means.

Following the transfer of Tadakuni, Nobuyuki Matsudaira from the Akashi domain of Harima Province assumed control with an allocation of 80,000 koku. However, in 1685, upon his appointment as rojū (senior councilor), he was relocated to the Koga domain in Shimousa Province.

In his stead, Tadahira Honda from the Utsunomiya Domain in Shimotsuke Province ascended with 120,000 koku. This branch of the Honda clan traced its lineage to Tadayoshi Honda, a grandson of Tadakatsu, distinct from the Masanaga line. Nevertheless, the succession was fraught with tragedy, as successive young lords met untimely demises. Honda Tadayatsu, the fifth lord, assumed leadership at the age of five, yet his domain dwindled to 50,000 koku, and he died at six years old in 1723, leaving no heir.

In 1724 during Shogun Tokugawa Yoshimune's reign, the Kyōhō Reforms expanded the shogunate's direct control territories. Yanagisawa Yoshito was appointed from the Kofu domain of Kai Province with an allotment of 151,000 koku. Subsequently, the Yanagisawa lineage ruled for six generations until the advent of the Meiji Restoration. The second generation, Nobukō, and the third generation, Yasumitsu, earned widespread reverence for their astute governance, fostering cultural and martial pursuits, and advancing industrial development. As a prominent feudal domain in the Kinai region, it assumed responsibility for safeguarding the Imperial Palace and undertaking fire prevention initiatives in Kyoto and Nara. During the Boshin War in 1868, it allied with the new government forces and engaged in combat in the Tohoku region.

In 1871, amidst the restructuring of administrative divisions, prefectures supplanted domains, leading to the establishment of Koriyama Prefecture, later subsumed into Nara Prefecture, which also encompassed Nara, Sakai, and Osaka prefectures before Nara Prefecture was once again separated.

The final lord of the domain, from the Yanagisawa clan, was ennobled as an earl in 1884, securing a peerage title.

== List of daimyō ==
#	Name	Tenure	Courtesy title	Court Rank	kokudaka
Mizuno clan, 1615–1619 (Fudai daimyo)
1	Mizuno Katsushige (水野勝成)	1615–1619	Hyuga no kami (日向の神)	Junior 5th Rank, Lower Grade (従五位下)	60,000 koku
Matsudaira-Okudaira clan,1619–1639 (Fudai daimyo)
1	Matsudaira Tadaaki (松平忠明)	1619–1639	Shimousa no Kami (下総守)	Junior 4th Rank, Lower Grade (従四位下)	120,000 koku
Honda clan, 1639–1679 (Fudai daimyo)
1	Honda Masakatsu (本多政勝)	1639–1671	-none-	Junior 5th Rank, Lower Grade (従四位下)	150,000 koku
2	Honda Masanaga (本多政長)	1671–1679	-none-	Junior 5th Rank, Lower Grade (従五位下)	150,000 koku
3	Honda Tadakuni (本多忠国)	1679	Daisuke Nakatsuka (遠江守)	Junior 5th Rank, Lower Grade (従五位下)	120,000 koku
Matsudaira-Fuijj clan,1679–1685 (Fudai daimyo)
1	Matsudaira Nobuyuki (松平信之)	1679–1685	Mukai no Kami, Hyuga no Kami	Junior 4th Rank, Lower Grade (従四位下)	120,000 koku
Honda clan, 1685–1724 (Fudai daimyo)
1	Honda Tadahira (本多忠平)	1685–1695	Noto no kami (のと の 髪)	Junior 5th Rank, Lower Grade (従五位下)	120,000 koku
2	Honda Tadatsune (本多忠常)	1695–1709	Noto no kami (のと の 髪)	Junior 5th Rank, Lower Grade (従五位下)	120,000 koku
3	Honda Tadatsune (本多忠直)	1709–1717	Etchu no kami, Shinano kami (越中守、信濃守)	Junior 5th Rank, Lower Grade (従五位下)	120,000 koku
4	Honda Tadamura (本多忠村)	1717–1722	-none-	Junior 5th Rank, Lower Grade (従五位下)	50,000 koku
5	Honda Tadatsura (本多忠烈)	1722–1724	-none-	Junior 5th Rank, Lower Grade (従五位下)	50,000 koku
Yanagisawa clan, 1724–1871 (Fudai daimyo)
1	Yanagisawa Yoshito (柳沢吉里)	1724–1745	Echizen no kami, Ise no kami, Kai no kami (越前の髪、伊勢の髪, 会 の髪)	Junior 4th Rank, Lower Grade (従五位下)	151,000 koku
2	Yanagisawa Nobutaki (柳沢信鴻)	1745–1773	-none-	Junior 5th Rank, Lower Grade (従五位下)	151,000 koku
3	Yanagisawa Yasumitsu (柳沢康光)	1773–1811	-none-	Junior 5th Rank, Lower Grade (従五位下)	151,000 koku
4	Yanagisawa Yasuhiro (柳沢保泰)	1811–1838	-none-	Junior 5th Rank, Lower Grade (従五位下)	151,000 koku
5	Yanagisawa Yasuoki (柳沢保興)	1838–1848	Shuzosei, Kai no kami (生の種子、会議の毛)	Junior 5th Rank, Lower Grade (従五位下)	151,000 koku
6	Yanagisawa Yasunobu (柳沢保申)	1848–1871	Kai no kami, Shosanmi (甲斐守正三位)	Junior 5th Rank, Lower Grade (従五位下)	151,000 koku

Mizuno Katsushige

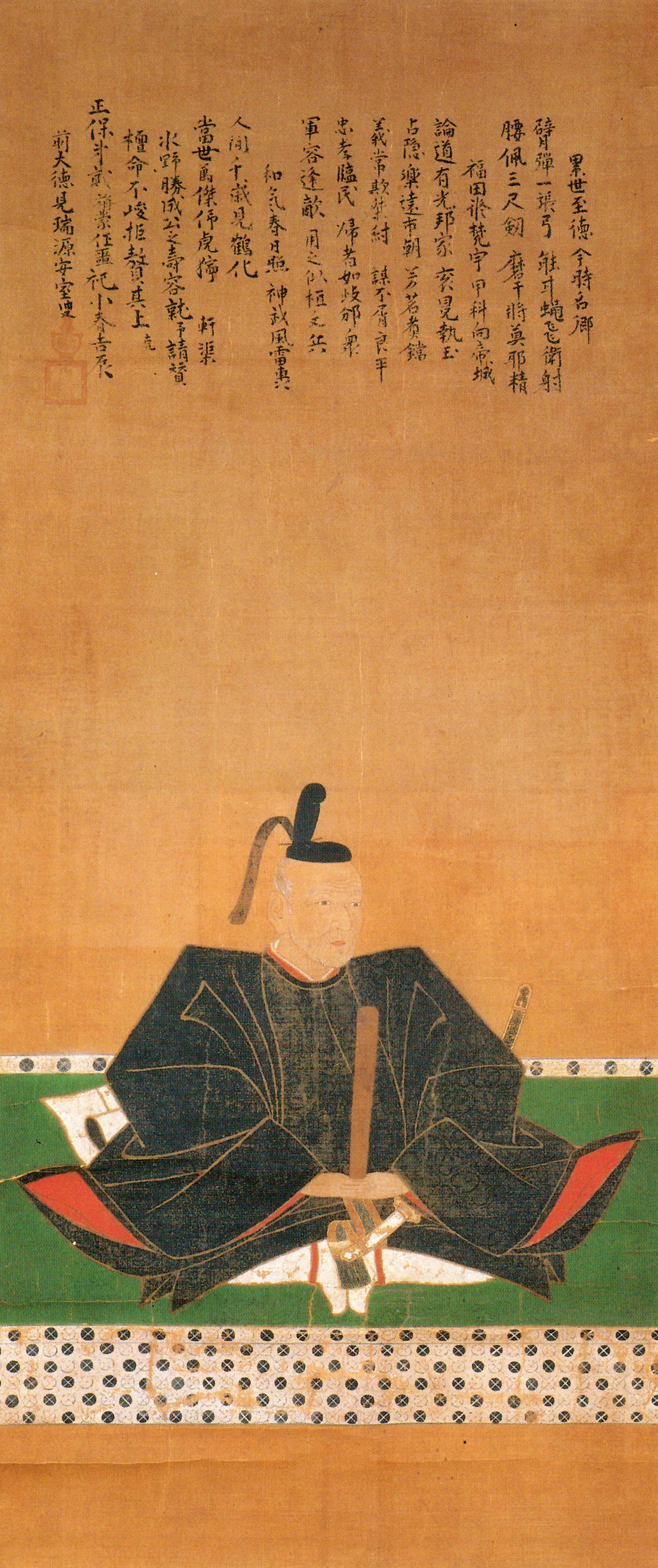
Mizuno Katsuhige

Mizuno Katsushige (水野勝成, August 15, 1564 – March 15, 1564), a prominent figure during the Azuchi-Momoyama period and the early Edo period, held various positions as a military commander and daimyō. He was appointed as the lord of the Kariya Domain in Mikawa Province, followed by his role as the lord of the Kōriyama Domain in Yamato Province. Eventually, he became the first lord of the Fukuyama Domain in Bingo Province. In a historical account compiled by Okaya Shigemi, a samurai belonging to the Tatebayashi Domain towards the end of the Edo period, Mizuno Katsunari was bestowed with the epithet "Rinkai Fuki," which translates to "too awesome to be tied down to anyone." This title reflects the awe-inspiring nature of Mizuno Katsunari's character and his exceptional abilities as a military commander. At the age of 88, he died within the walls of Fukuyama Castle in the year 1651. Following his death, his body was laid to rest at Kenchu-ji, the temple belonging to the Mizuno clan located in close proximity to Fukuyama Castle. The direct lineage of his descendants came to an end in the year 1698, marking the conclusion of his family line. Despite this, in 1919, Katsunari was honored posthumously with an elevation to the lower third rank of the Imperial Court, recognizing his contributions and legacy.

Matsudaira Tadaaki

Matsudaira Tadaaki

Matsudaira Tadaaki (松平忠明, 1583 – May 1, 1644), a prominent figure during the Azuchi-Momoyama period to the early Edo period, held various positions as a military commander and daimyo. Not only was he a trusted political advisor to the Tokugawa Shogunate, but he also governed multiple domains across different provinces. Tadaaki served as the lord of the Sakute Domain in Mikawa Province, the Kameyama Domain in Ise Province, the Osaka Domain in Settsu Province, the Kōriyama Domain in Yamato Province, and the Himeji Domain in Harima Province. His official rank was Junior Fourth Rank Lower, Chamberlain, and Shimousa no Kami, showcasing his esteemed status within the political hierarchy. Furthermore, Tadaaki's influence extended beyond his individual accomplishments, as he is recognized as the founder of the esteemed Okudaira-Matsudaira clan.

Honda Masakatsu

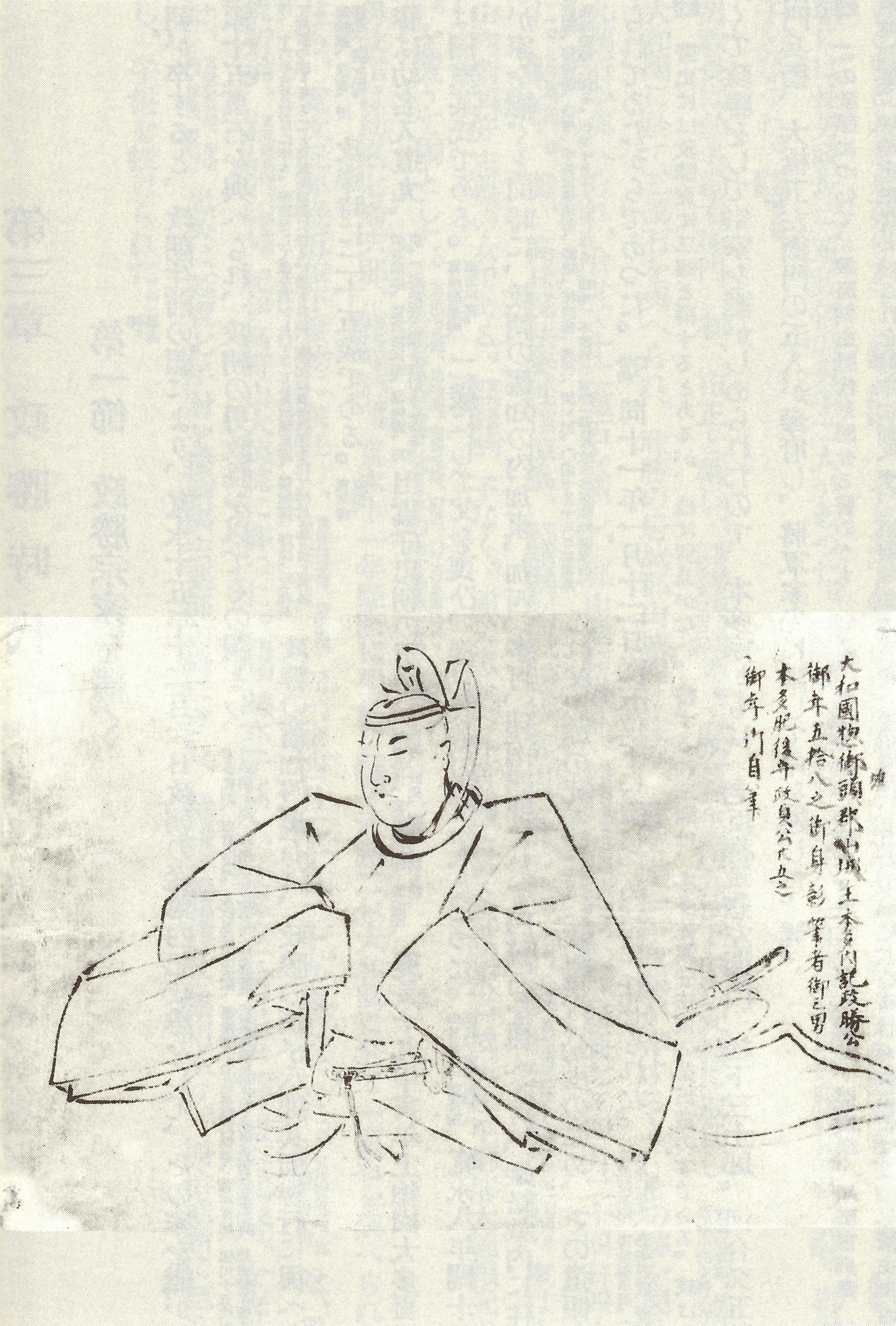
Honda Masakatsu

Honda Masakatsu (本多政勝, c. 1619 – October 30, 1671), held the position of a daimyo. He served as the third lord of both the Himeji-Nitta Domain in Harima Province and the Himeji Domain. Later on, he became the first lord of the Kōriyama Domain in Yamato Province. As the fourth generation head of the Honda clan from the Tadakatsu lineage, he was known for his bravery on the battlefield and earned himself the nicknames "Kinaiki" and "Ouchiki." Masakatsu was the second son of Honda Tadatomo, further solidifying his noble lineage and position within the samurai hierarchy. In 1615, Masakatsu's father Honda Tadatomo died in battle, leading his cousin Honda Masatomo to take over the family. Masakatsu then became the leader of his branch of the clan. By 1637, Masatomo's health declined, so he passed the clan leadership to Masakatsu, who was to pass it on to Masanaga once he came of age. Masakatsu then moved to Kōriyama Domain and succeeded Matsudaira Tadaaki. Tensions grew within the clan as Masakatsu favored his biological son's political ambitions over his adopted son, Masanaga. This conflict led to the September 6 Incident, and Masakatsu died in October 1671, causing a dispute over clan leadership that continued after his death.

Honda Masanaga

Honda Masanaga (Lord of Kōriyama Domain) (本多政長, 1633 – April 24, 1679), held the position of a daimyo during the early Edo period and served as the second lord of the Koriyama domain in Yamato Province. He belonged to the Tadakatsu line of the Honda clan, being the fifth head of this lineage. Born as the eldest son of Honda Masatomo, who was the lord of Harima-Himeji Domain, Honda Masanaga married Fu, the daughter of Yamauchi Tadatoyo, the lord of the Tosa Domain. His official titles included Junior Fifth Rank (Junior Fifth Rank, Lower Grade), Mayor of the City, and later Daisuke Nakatsukasa. Masanaga was a direct descendant of the Honda Nakatsukasa Daisuke clan and was also the great-grandson of Honda Tadakatsu. His lineage and connections within the Honda clan and through marriage to the Yamauchi clan played a significant role in his position and influence during his time as a daimyo. At six, Masanaga lost his father to illness, leading his cousin Honda Masakatsu to take over as head of the Honda clan. In 1653, Honda Katsuyuki inherited 30,000 koku in Yamato Province after losing his heir, with the remaining 10,000 koku going to his brother Masanobu. Despite being intended to take over the Kōriyama Domain, Masanaga was not allowed to due to his young age, causing internal clanm turmoil. After Masakatsu's death in 1671, Masatoshi colluded with Tadakiyo Sakai to divide Koriyama's koku, resulting in Masanaga receiving 90,000 koku. In 1679, Honda Masanaga was poisoned by Masari, leading his adopted heir Honda Tadakuni to take over the domain.

Honda Tadakuni

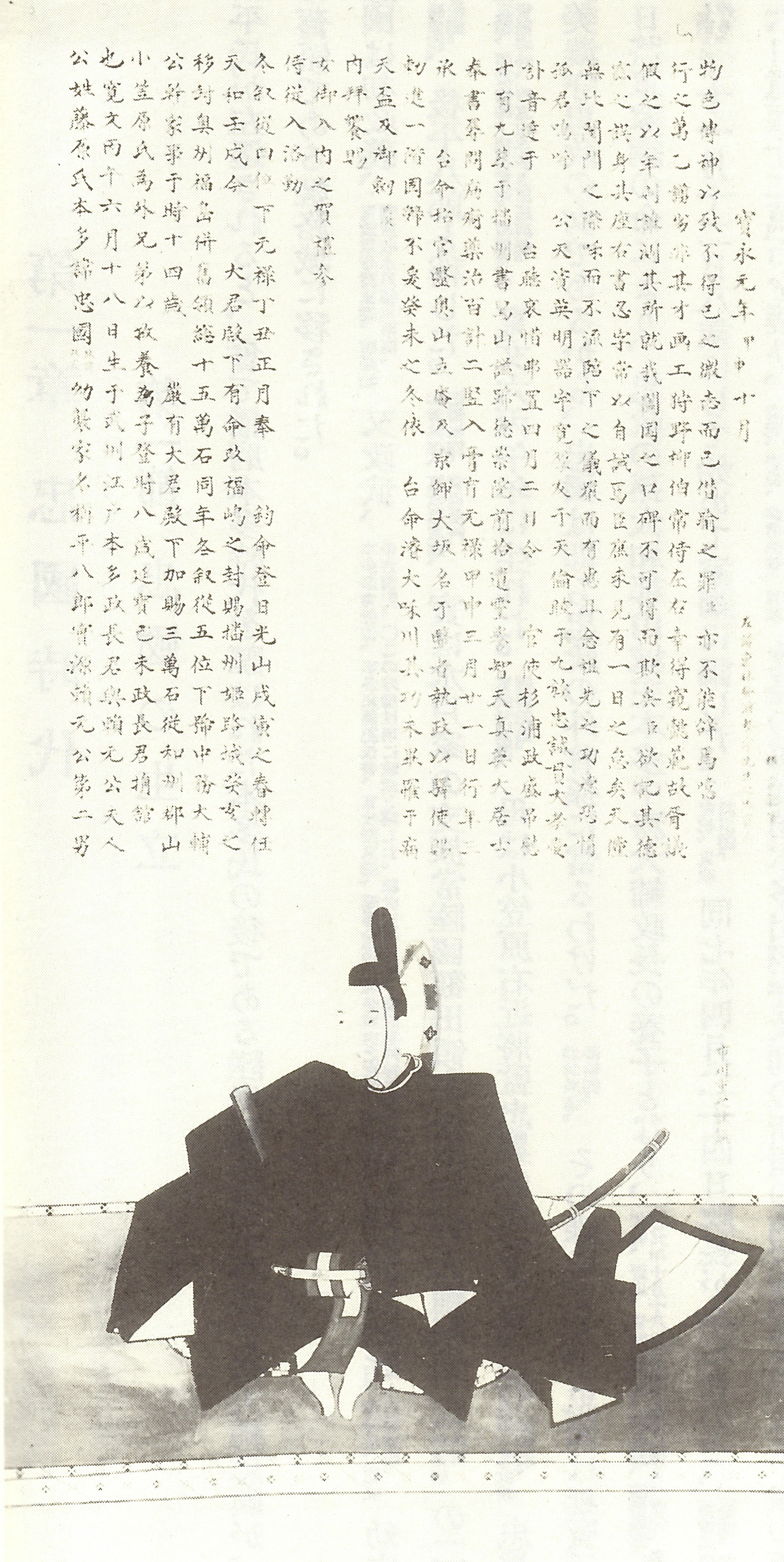
Honda Tadakuni

Honda Tadakuni (本多忠国, 1666 – March 21, 1704), a prominent figure during the early Edo period, held the esteemed position of daimyo over various domains in Japan. Initially, he ruled over the Kōriyama Domain in Yamato Province, then the Fukushima Domain, and finally the Harima-Himeji Domain, showcasing his influence and power within the Honda clan. As the second son of Yorimoto Matsudaira, the daimyo of the Moriyama Domain, Honda Tadakuni came from a lineage of notable figures in Japanese history. His clan connections were strong, being the grandson of Yorifusa Tokugawa, the first lord of the Mito Domain, and the nephew of Tokugawa Mitsukuni, the second lord of the domain, which further solidified his position in society. Honda Tadakuni's journey to leadership began when he was adopted by Honda Masanaga, the daimyo of the Kōriyama Domain in Yamato Province. Following Masanaga's passing, Tadakuni was entrusted with the responsibilities of the Fukushima Domain, and later the Himeji Domain, all while taking on the mantle of the 6th head of the Tadakatsu line within the Honda clan. His legacy continued through his son Tadataka, who succeeded him as the head of the family after his death.

Matsudaira Nobuyuki

Matsudaira Nobuyuki (松平信之, 1631 – July 22, 1686), served as a daimyo and roju during the formative years of the Edo period. Holding the title of lord in multiple domains, including the Akashi Domain in Harima Province, the Kōriyama Domain in Yamato Province, and the Koga Domain in Shimōsa Province, he played a significant role in the political landscape of his time. As a member of the Fujii-Matsudaira clan, Nobuyuki was the fifth generation to carry on the family legacy. His official rank, denoted as Junior Fourth Rank (lower rank), Hyuga no kami, reflected his standing within the feudal hierarchy of Japan during that era. Born as the second son of Matsudaira Tadakuni, he inherited the title after his older brother died. He actively developed new lands and took over an estate valued at 65,000 koku. He oversaw the maintenance of Hitomaru Shrine and commissioned the construction of the "Banshu Akashiura Kakimoto Tayu Shrine Monument." He also played a role in establishing Tenjin Shrine and supported local figures like Banzan Kumazawa. He moved from Akashi to Kōriyama in 1679 and led relief and reconstruction efforts after a devastating fire. He achieved the title of Karimazume in 1682 and Rōjū in 1685 before his death in 1686.

Honda Tadahira

Honda Tadahira (本多忠平, 1632 – October 15, 1695), held the position of a daimyo, serving as the second lord of Shirakawa Domain in Mutsu Province, the lord of Utsunomiya Domain in Shimono Province, and the first lord of Koriyama Domain in Yamato Province. With an official rank of Junior Fourth Rank Lower, Noto no kami, Honda Tadahira played a significant role in the governance and administration of these domains, showcasing his leadership and influence during that period. Born in 1632, he became the leader of his family in 1662. He distributed land to his siblings, totaling 100,000 koku. In 1681, he moved to Utsunomiya and gained popularity for his effective governance, including tax reductions. Even after moving to Kōriyama Domain in 1685, he maintained connections with Utsunomiya. In Kōriyama Domain, he oversaw the establishment of new castle towns and issued domain bills. However, his fiscal reforms were unsuccessful. He died in Edo in 1695 at the age of 66. His younger brother and adopted heir, Tadatsune, continued the Honda clan's line.

Honda Tadastune'

Honda Tadastune (本多忠直, 1661 – April 17, 1709), born in 1661, was the sixth son of Honda Tadayoshi. He was promoted to Jugoinoge, Noto no kami in 1677 and became the clan head after his older brother's death in 1695. In 1699, financial difficulties arose in the domain due to fires and construction expenses. To secure the clan's future, Tadatsune adopted his nephew Tadanao in 1707. Tadatsune died at aged 49 in 1709. His nephew Tadanao succeeded him as the clan head, and his tombstone in Yamatokoriyama City is a designated cultural property with his career history engraved by Hayashi Nobutatsu.

Honda Tadanao

Honda Tadanao (本多忠直 (大和国郡山藩主, 1670 – May 8, 1717), Honda Tadanao was a prominent daimyo in the mid-Edo period, holding the position of the third lord of the Kōriyama Domain in Yamato Province. Honda Tadanao, born as the eldest son of Honda Tadaharu, he was the nephew of Honda Tadatsune, the second lord of the domain. Honda Tadanao was appointed Jugoinoge and Etchu no kami on December 18, 1702, and later named the adopted heir of his uncle Tadatsune on October 10, 1707. He was also appointed Shinano no kami on December 12 of the same year. After the passing of his uncle Tadatsune in 1709, Honda Tadanao became the lord of the Kōriyama Domain. He died on May 8, 1717, at the age of 48, leaving his responsibilities to his second son, Tadamura. Honda Tadanao's final resting place is at the Minobuyama Kuonji Temple in Yamanashi Prefecture, where his memory and contributions are honored.

Honda Tadamura

Honda Tadamura (本多忠村, 1710 – September 30, 1722), served as the fourth lord of the served as the fourth lord of the Kōriyama Domain in Yamato Province. He was born as the second son of Honda Tadanao, the third lord of the domain. In 1717, after his father's death, Tadamura became the lord of the Koriyama domain. Despite his young age, he was allowed to remain in his position thanks to the forgiveness granted by the 8th Shogun Yoshimune Tokugawa. Tadamura died from smallpox in Edo on September 30, 1722 at the age of 13. His legacy was carried on by his younger brother, Tadayoshi. Tadamura's final resting place is at Rinshoin in Yushima, Bunkyo-ku, Tokyo. in Yamato Province. He was born as the second son of Tadanao Honda, the third lord of the domain.

Honda Tadatsura

Honda Tadatsura

Yanagisawa Yoshito

Yanagisawa Yoshito

Yanagisawa Nobutaki

Yanagisawa Nobutaki

Yanagisawa Yasumitsu

Yanagisawa Yasumitsu

Yanagisawa Yasuhiro

Yanagisawa Yasuhiro

Yanagisawa Yasuoki

Yanagisawa Yasuoki

Yanagisawa Yasunobu

Yanagisawa Yasunobu

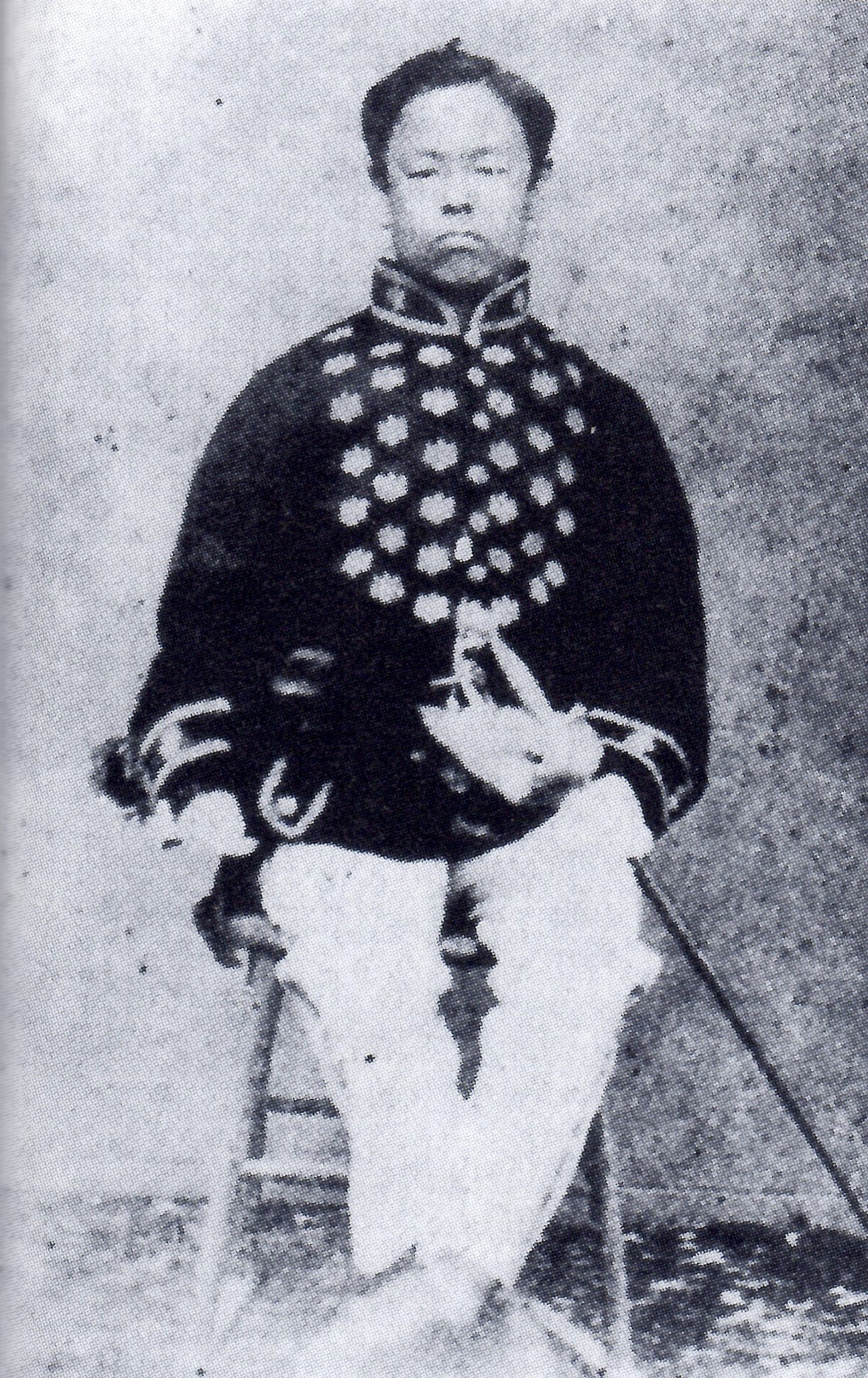
Yanagisawa Yasunobu, final daimyo of Kōriyama Domain

== See also ==
- List of han
- Abolition of the han system
