= Mizuno Katsushige =

Sengoku period Samurai and Daimyo (1564–1651)

Mizuno Katsunari
- 水野 勝成
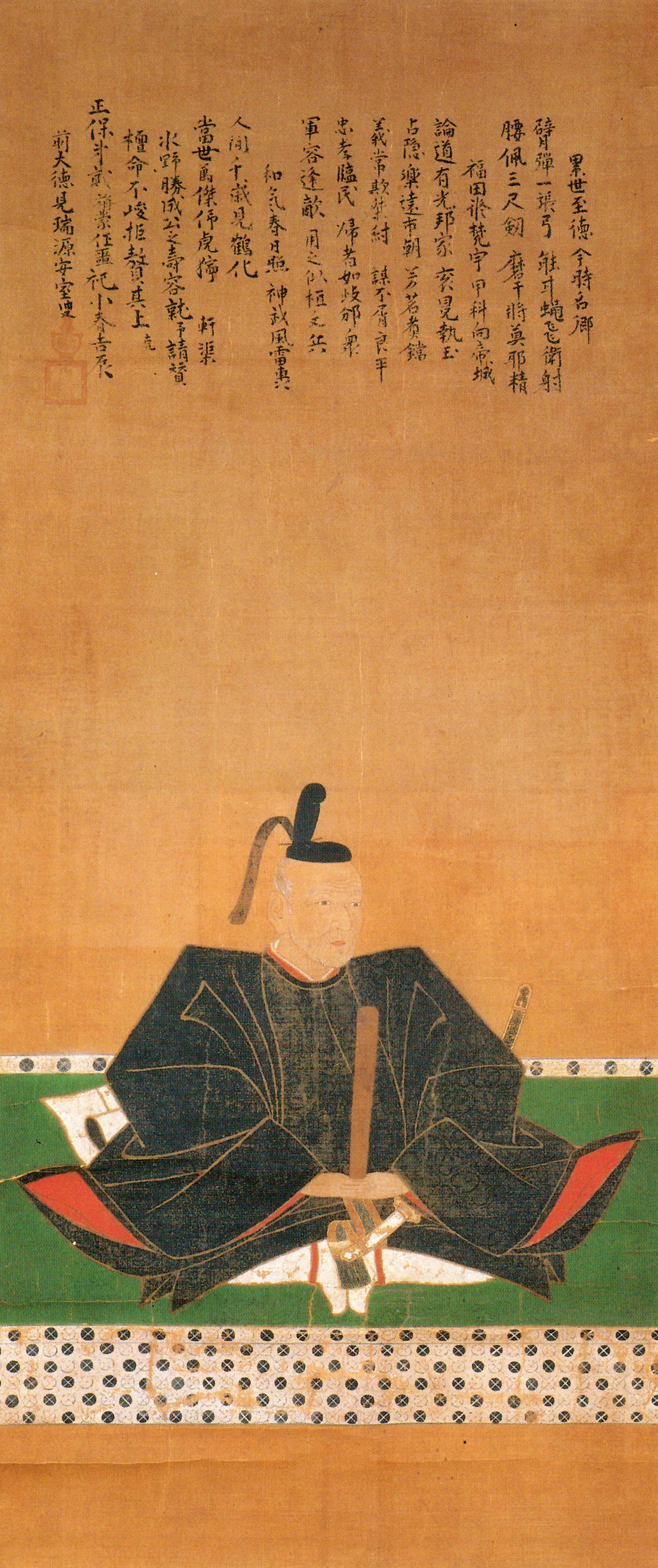

Daimyo of Kariya Domain
- In office 1600–1615
- Succeeded by: Mizuno Tadakiyo

Daimyo of Kōriyama Domain
- In office 1615–1619
- Succeeded by: Matsudaira Tadaaki

Daimyo of Fukuyama Domain
- In office 1619–1639
- Succeeded by: Mizuno Katsutoshi

Personal details
- Born: September 20, 1564 Okazaki, Aichi
- Died: May 4, 1651 (aged 86) Kenchu-ji Temple, Fukuyama Domain
- Relations: Mizuno Tadashige (father); Mizuno Katsutoshi (son)
- Nickname(s): Rin-kai-fuki; Oni-Hyūga

Military service
- Allegiance: Mizuno Tadashige (Tokugawa clan→Oda Nobukatsu) → Toyotomi Hideyoshi (Sengoku Hidehisa → Sassa Narimasa → Kuroda Yoshitaka → Konishi Yukinaga → Katō Kiyomasa → Tachibana Muneshige) → ? → Mōri clan (Mimura Chikanari) → Tokugawa clan (Tokugawa Ieyasu → Tokugawa Hidetada → Tokugawa Iemitsu)
- Unit: Mizuno clan
- Battles/wars: Siege of Takatenjin (1581); Battle of Tenmokuzan; Tenshō-Jingo war; Battle of Wakamiko; Battle of Kurokoma; Tokugawa-Toyotomi conflict (1584); Siege of Hoshizaki Castle; Battle of Hakusanmori; Battle of Nagakute; Siege of Kanie Castle; Invasion of Shikoku (1585); Kumabe Chikanaga Rebellion; Amakusa five clan's Rebellion; Kyūshū campaign; Sekigahara campaign; Battle of Sone castle; Siege of Ōgaki Castle; Campaign against Toyotomi Hideyori; Battle of Dōmyōji; Battle of Tennōji; Shimabara Rebellion

Mizuno Katsunari (水野 勝成; September 20, 1564 – May 4, 1651), also known as Mizuno Rokuzaemon (水野 六左衛門), was a Japanese samurai and daimyō of the late Sengoku and early Edo periods. Mizuno Katsushige was known for his participations in battles against Takeda clan, Tenshō-Jingo war, Kyūshū campaign, Battle of Komaki and Nagakute, Battle of Sekigahara, Siege of Osaka, and Shimabara Rebellion.

During his life, Katsunari often changed his allegiance. However, in the end he returned to serve his original lord, Tokugawa Ieyasu, and continued his service to the Tokugawa shogunate for 3 generations until Tokugawa Iemitsu. Katsunari tendency to change his allegiance quite often has garnered him a nickname Rin kai fuki (倫魁不羈), which etymologically means "too awesome to serve (only) one lord". Katsunari died on May 4, 1651.

His court title was Koretō Hyūga no Kami (惟任日向守). It was said that since Akechi Mitsuhide, no one wanted the title of Hyūga no Kami until Katsunari, as Katsunari did not bother with Mitsuhide's bad reputation as a traitor and the superstitious belief about the title. Since then, Katsunari got the nickname Hyūga Demon (鬼日向). Katsunari's journeys during his life and his friendship with the legendary Rōnin Miyamoto Musashi has produced many anecdotes about him.

== Early life ==
Born as a son of Mizuno Tadashige.

=== Early battles ===
His first battle was in the 7th year of Tensho ( 1579 ), when he still 15 years old. when he followed Tadashige to attack Takatenjin Castle in Totomi, but due to Katsuyori Takeda 's retreat, the battle did not take place. (Note: However, there is record that Katsunari participated with his father during Nobunaga invasion to Shinano province in 1573.)

In 1580, his father Tadashige was appointed by Oda Nobunaga and became the daimyo of Kariya. In 1581, Katsunari participated in the siege of Takatenjin once again, where the Tokugawa forces manage to subdue this castle. Yuki city historical record wrote that following the capture of Tenjin Castle, Katsunari personally received a letter of commendation from Oda Nobunaga for his military exploits in this battle.

In 1582, Katsunari participated in the Tenshō-Jingo war, on the side of Tokugawa. During this conflict, at the battle of Wakamiko, Katsunari was wounded. Later, Hōjō Ujitada trying to attack the Tokugawa army position by leading a detachment to the rear of the latter's position. Then, Torii Mototada led 2,000 soldiers in raid operation to repel the 10,000 Hōjō army attempt to flank the Tokugawa army position. Katsunari participated in this assault together with colleague Yasusada Miyake. Hōjō Ujikatsu saw this and went to Ujitada's rescue, but Katsunari and Miyake manage to repel Ujikatsu's reinforcements. Katsunari charging his horse without pause, while being aided by Sakakibara Yasumasa and Okabe Nagamori, until the enemy forces retreated. Despite some quarrel with Mototada as he viewed Katsunari being reckless and not following order, Katsunari were praised for his outstanding performance and received some rewards. Due to this setback, Hōjō army failed to launch attack on Tokugawa army's rear.

On October 29, during the peace negotiation between Tokugawa clan with the Hojo clan, Ieyasu decided that hostages were unnecessary and sent Katsunari, Mototada Torii, and Yasumasa Sakakibara to escort the supposed hostage from the Hōjō clan to return from Misaka Castle.

In February 1584, Toyotomi Hideyoshi planned to attack the rebels from Negoro-ji temple and the Saiga Ikki in Izumi Province and Kii Province respectively. Hideyoshi ordered his generals to assemble in Osaka, and requested Oda Nobukatsu to join him. Nobukatsu did not take part himself, but instead sent Katsunari and Yoshimura Ujiyoshi to march to attack the Saiga Ikki under Hideyoshi's command on March 27.

=== Komaki-Nagakute campaign ===
In 1584, Katsunari participated along with his father in the conflict between Tokugawa against Toyotomi Hideyoshi in Komaki-Nagakute. Katsunari were tasked to assist his father and Ishikawa Kazumasa in the siege of the Hoshizaki Castle which defended by Okada Yoshiatsu. In this operation Katsunari stormed the castle and capturing it.

Later, After arriving in Kiyosu, Ieyasu dispatched Mizuno Katsunari to Kuwana, Ise, to reinforce Kobe Castle, which was being defended by Nobukatsu's vassal, Kobe Masatake. shortly after, Katsunari moved from mount Komaki, to Obata Castle, where he and his father rendezvous with Sakai Tadatsugu, Sakakibara Yasumasa, Osuga Yasutaka, Honda Yasushige, and others to strike Toyotomi Hidetsugu army. During this moment, he was berated by Tadashige for not wearing helmet, as Katsunari argues that he had ailment on his eyes which forcing him to bandage his head and preventing him to wear helmet. (Note: According to Mizuno Katsunari memorandum, he was regarded as "Mizuno Tojuro" here.)

Later, during the main engagement in Nagakute, Katsunari and his father leading reinforcement troops along with Okabe Nagamori, and Niwa Ujitsugu with 5,300 soldiers to assist Ieyasu's force at Obata castle, where they manage to crush Hidetsugu's forces together with Osuga Yasutaka and Yasumasa. Later, Katsunari took action in ambushing the camp of Toyotomi general named Shirae Narisada who did not expect the attack, and personally presented many heads of the enemies he slain to Ieyasu. Later, while Ii Naomasa's army clashing against the army of Mori Nagayoshi. sharing the glory of the victory with Naomasa after the end of campaign. However, Mizuno Tadayoshi rather annoyed with his son's conduct of disobeying the central command and took the initiative independently by attacking the enemy before being commanded, thus prompting Tadayoshi to further criticize Katsunari.

Several months later, Katsunari also participated the Siege of Kanie Castle, where he joined the ranks of Ieyasu's Hatamoto retainers in blockading the port of the castle, and hijacked two ships belongs to Kuki Yoshitaka. During this siege, Katsunari was recorded to fight in one-on-one combat against Takigawa Sankurō, son of Takigawa Kazumasu. Although both of them were injured, but no one died in this duel as both retreated safely. Katsunari units also manage other achieve good performance here, including one which Hattori Yasuhide(Hattori Hanzō's nephew), who at that time served under Katsunari, has participated.and achieved military exploits.

Later, Katsunari followed the Tokugawa operations in Kuwana, Mie, in Ise Province, against Nobuo Oda who now making peace with Toyotomi Hideyoshi. However, during this time Katsunari committed a huge crime by murdering his father's vassal who reported Katsunari's misconduct. Tadashige, who has lost his patience in dealing with his son's unruly behavior, immediately disown and disinherit Katsunari from the Mizuno clan.

== Wandering years ==
After being disowned by his own father, he moved around with relatives from town to town Mino, Owari, and finally went to Kyoto. In Kyoto, he strode around without any attendants, sleeping at the temple gate of Nanzen-ji Temple, and when he went out into town, interacted with many outlaws. Katsunari also reported to have a big fight and killed many people in Shimizu.

=== Serving Oda Nobukatsu ===
On March 27, 1585, Katsunari entered service of Oda Nobukatsu, who now on good terms with Hideyoshi. Katsunari participated in the Conquest of Kishu, particularly in the subjugation of Saika Ikki rebellion. Later, Katsunari participated in the Invasion of Shikoku which held in the same year, as he served under the command of Sengoku Hidehisa, who appoint Katsunari a control of Domain with 728 Koku. However, soon Katsunari going renegade again by abandoned his post and fled to Chūgoku region, It was said that during this period, Katsunari had a quarrel with one of his lord's vassal and ended killing him in the ensuing fight. Thus this accident prompting Katsunari to escape and became fugitive, as Toyotomi Hideyoshi, who become angry for this incident, sent an executioner to kill Katsunari. From then on, Katsunari adopted a pseudonym name "Rokuzaemon" to escape justice.

=== Serving Sassa Narimasa ===
In 1587, Katsunari changed entered the service under a daimyo of Higo Province, Sassa Narimasa, where he awarded a control of domain with 1,000 koku. Katsunari followed participated in the suppression of Kumabe Chikanaga rebellion. that Katsunari spearheading the attack towards Kikuchi Castle and also participated as a relief force to the Kumamoto Castle to repel the rebel's siege. It was said that in during this operation to save Kumamoto castle, Katsunari once competing in military merit with Awa Narutonosuke, one of Narimasa's most famous vassal who are listed in the later era period as member of semi-mythical legendary warriors group known as "Ten Braves of Amago". Here, Katsunari worked in cooperation with the Tachibana clan commanders such as Tachibana Muneshige, Totoki Tsuresada, and Yasuda Kunitsugu to relieve the cadtle from rebel's threat and he personally slay the rebel general named Kumabe Chikayasu together with his son.

During his time serving Narimasa, Katsunari also accepted Ibara Tomomasa, a former Ii Naomasa vassal who also run away from his lord due to troubles, into his rank. Later, in 1588, Katsunari would mediate the reconciliation of Tomomasa with Naomasa, so he returned to the service of Ii clan. However, later Sassa Narimasa was executed as he was blamed for Kumabe Chikanaga rebellion's outbreak. Later in the same year, prompting Katsunari to enter the service of Kuroda Yoshitaka and participated in the Kyūshū Campaign.

=== Aftermath of servitude to Narimasa ===
Later, Katsunari once again changing his allegiance of service to Katō Kiyomasa, then changed again to serve Konishi Yukinaga.

In 1589, Katsunari was appointed to control domain of 1,000 under Yukinaga, Then he participated in the suppression of five Christian clans of Amakusa (not the 1637 Christians Shimabara Rebellion), where he served under the command of Yukinaga who brought 6,500 soldiers. with reinforcements from Katō Kiyomasa, He captured Shiki Castle, the stronghold of Shiki clan of Shimabara, and also captured Hondo Castle which defendede by Amakusa Tanemoto. After that, Katsunari left Yukinaga's rank and temporarily serving Kiyomasa and then later Muneshige Tachibana. However, the tenure of Katsunari's service under those two were short, before he changed his allegiance again.

On the aftermath of his service under Muneshige, Katsunari life was obscured with various legendary tales without veracity. The only light during his journey was when he started serving as a guest of Mimura Chikanari, a Mōri clan's vassal in 1594. During his stay here it was recorded that he was betrothed to a woman who later gave birth to Katsunari's son, Mizuno Katsutoshi, who will inherit the Mizuno clan in the future.

== Return to serve the Tokugawa clan ==
In 1599, Katsunari returned to Tokugawa service, as he reconciled with his father and Ieyasu Tokugawa. At this time, Katsunari was given him domain worth of approximately 10,000 koku worth. On April 22 of the same year, Katsunari's younger sister, Kanahime (later known as Seijoin), became Ieyasu's adopted daughter and married to Katō Kiyomasa. In 1600, Katsunari participated in Eastern army during Sekigahara Campaign and being entrusted to lead the army of Mino Province to the campaign of Aizu. However, on July 18, Tadashige was murdered by Kaganoi Shigemochi, an ally of Mitsunari. Then Katsunari were appointed to inherit the position of his father as the head of Mizuno clan. Katsunari, who became the head of the Mizuno family, returned to Kariya castle due to the cancellation of the Aizu conquest and went to the Battle of Sekigahara.

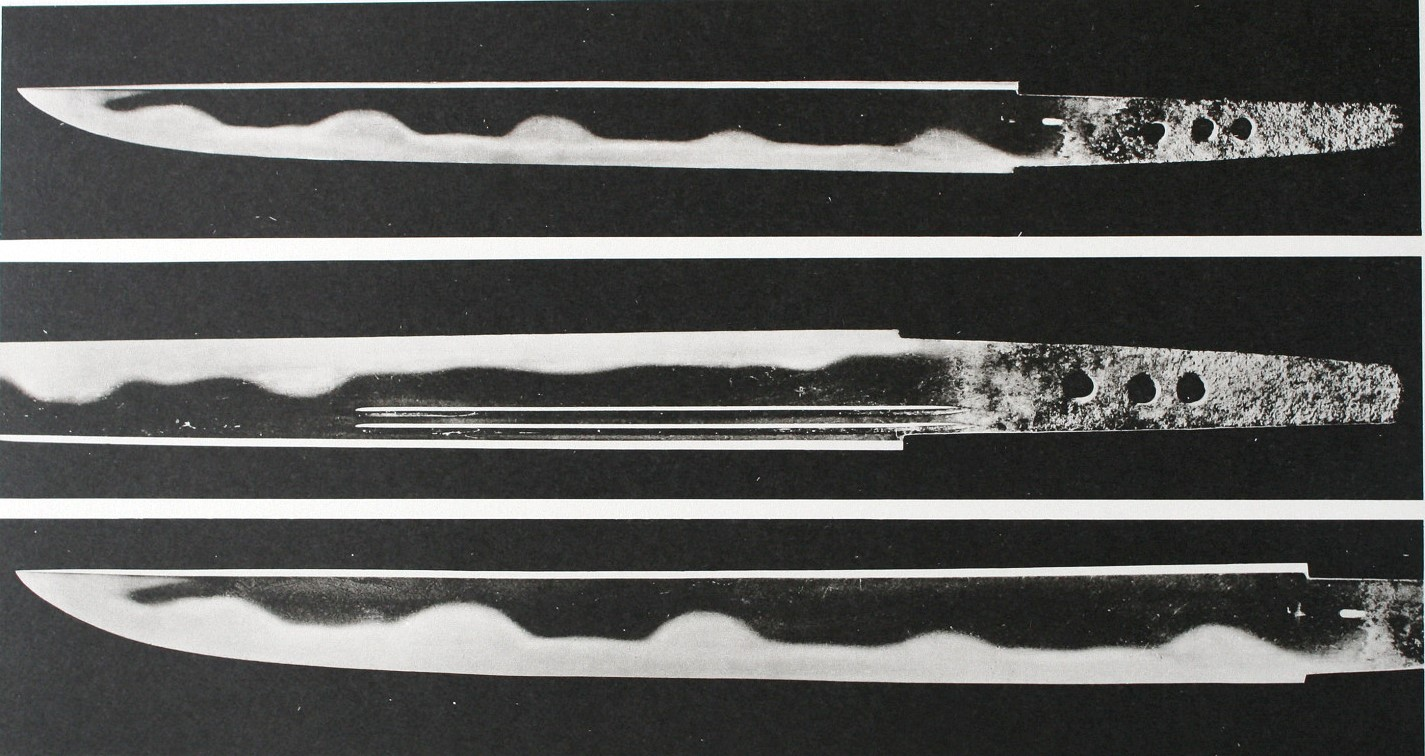
Tantō/Hyūga Masamune, Formerly in possession of Ishida Mitsunari; It was seized by Mizuno Katsunari In Ogaki castle

As the armed confrontations between the Eastern army and the Western army started, Katsunari was tasked in command of Sone castle under the command of Ii clan and Honda clan under Ii Naomasa and Honda Tadakatsu to suppress the enemy in Ogaki. However, as there are detachments of Western army approaching Gifu Castle, were tasked to take their forces to Gifu, while leaving the command of Sone castle to the Katsunari while he also ordered to strengthen the castle defense. On September 13, Shimazu Yoshihiro led his soldiers to besiege Sone Castle and bombarding Sone castle with their artilleries. Facing this situation, Naomasa and Tadakatsu implored Katsunari to repulse the Shimazu forces. In response, Katsunari goes out with sallying force with his younger brother, Mizuno Tadatane, to defend Sone Castle. Katsunari ordered his artilleries to return fire at the turret of the Shimazu artilleries, and he then led his army storming the Shimazu position and manage to overcome the Shimazu clan's army, breaking through two or three baileys, causing Yoshihiro to retreat and abandon the siege against Sone castle. After he beat the Shimazu forces, Katsunari returned to Ieyasu to ask permission to participate on the Sekigahara main battle which planned in the next day. Ieyasu instead ordered Katsunari to guard Sone castle and keep an eyes on Ogaki castle which located nearby and being controlled by Western army loyal to Mitsunari.

In response, Katsunari then brought his troops at midnight to surround Ogaki castle and clashed with a Western army from Ogaki castle which led by Fukuhara Nagataka. Nagataka then surrender and captured. Katsunari then continues by burning the wall and outer citadels of the Ogaki castle. As Katsunari burned the outer citadels of Ogaki castle, the Western army nearby that area, including the Shimazu clan who has just beaten by Katsunari's army, decided to abort their plan to go into as they thought the Ogaki castle could not be saved. Then Yoshihiro decided to retreat into Ise Province. (Note: the memorandum about Sekigahara campaign has theorized that the castle were still not fallen at that moment. However, Yoshihiro saw the Smokes soared high from the Ogaki castle and though the castle already fallen.)

After the victory of Tokugawa army in the main battle of Sekigahara, Katsunari immediately persuade the defender of Ogaki castle, Akizuki Tanenaga, to surrender, which immediately accepted. Katsunari entered Ogaki castle and immediately wrote a letter to Ii Naomasa to give pardon to Tanenaga, which accepted by Ieyasu. he also seized the Hyūga Masamune blade belongs to Ishida Mitsunari, However, Katsunari found that one of the castle attendant was Kaganoi Yahachiro, son of Kaganoi Shigemochi. Katsunari immediately execute Yahachiro to avenge his father who has been murdered by Shigemochi, This caused the extinction of the Kaganoi clan.

In December 1608, It was reported that Katsunari met with Miyamoto Musashi. Musashi taught Katsunari the secret techniques of his swordstyle.

=== Campaign against Toyotomi Hideyori ===
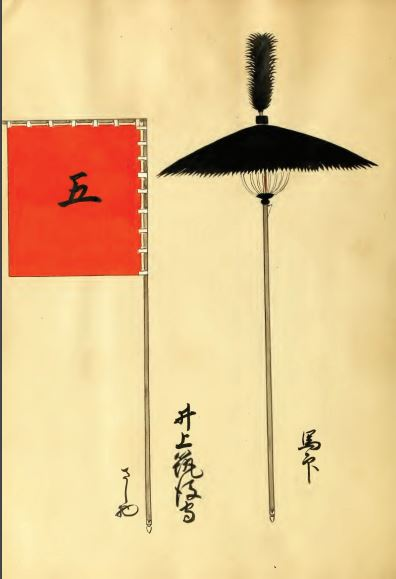
Mizuno Katsunari's Battle Standard

In 1614, Katsunari participated during the Tokugawa forces Siege of Osaka against Toyotomi Hideyori. It was believed that Miyamoto Musashi fought on this battle under his banner, and become one of Katsunari's son mounted bodyguard. Furthermore, Musashi's adopted son, Miyamoto Mikinosuke, also served under Katsunari. According to the Sekisui zatsuwa, Mikinosuke was also Musashi's paternal relative through Nakagawa Shimanosuke, who was also a vassal of Katsunari. The attendance of Musashi in this conflict under the Mizuno clan also attested by contemporary Oba clan record documents. A document titled Munekyu-sama Godeko (a collection of Katsunari's words and actions after his retirement) also mentions Mikinosuke.

On December 20, peace was established between Tokugawa and Toyotomi. As the reclamation of the moat became a condition for peace, Katsunari also became involved in the reclamation of the moat at Aoyaguchi, northeast of Osaka Castle. After that, he served as the guard at the Kuromonguchi (Sakuramon) gate of Osaka Castle, and returned to Kariya in February.

In 1615, conflict against Hideyori broke again. Katsunari participated this summer phase of Osaka siege, he was appointed as the first commander in chief of the Yamatoguchi area (Yamato area army). Katsunari was given strict order to not initiate the assault towards the castle. Then he mobilize his troops from Kyoto to Nara city, where he met an enemy forces led by Ōno Harufusa who were on their march to attack Koriyama castle at Nara. However, Harufusa army immediately disengage and retreat after they saw Katsunari forces. After he arrived in Nara, Katsunari rendezvoused his army with Honda Tadamasa Matsudaira Tadaaki, Date Masamune, Matsudaira Tadateru, and others. On May 4, Katsunari was called by Shogun Tokugawa Hidetada and went to Fushimi, where he received an award of 50 gold pieces for his efforts in preventing the enemy from attack city Nara. Later, Katsunari taking his army of 3,800 soldiers south through the night, and on the May 5, He set out with Hori Naoyori, Matsukura Shigemasa, Bessho Magojiro, Okuda Tadatsugu, Niwa Ujinobu, Nakayama Terumori, Murase Shigeharu, and others, and arrived at Kokubu at 4 p.m. to camp.

On the May 6, Katsunari fought against Gotō Mototsugu, his former colleague when still serving Kuroda clan, in the Battle of Dōmyōji. According to "Hyuga no kami memorandum" record, Katsunari disregard Ieyasu's order to not engage the enemy first and charging his forces towards Mototsugu position, practically eliminating Mototsugu's entire army. He then advanced further with his troops to Honda Village, where he clashed against another Toyotomi general named Watanabe Tadasu, and where he fatally injured Tadasu. Another prominent Toyotomi general named Susukida Kanesuke also fallen by Katsunari's troops. Katsunari then further pursuing the enemies and catch up against Usuda Kanesao, who were killed by one of Katsunari's lieutenant. As he pursue further, he met up with the rear guard of the Toyotomi army, led by Sanada Yukimura, Mōri Katsunaga, Akashi Takenori, and Ōno Harunaga. At this point, Katsunari asked Date Masamune repeatedly to keep pursuing the enemies, which rejected by Masamune as he stated lacks of ammunition and the casualties mounted so far.

In the final engagement against the Toyotomi forces on the Battle of Tennōji, the Echizen Matsudaira forces were defeated by Akashi Nobutsuna and fled to Katsunari's forces. When Yukimura lost his momentum of suicidal charge in an attempt to kill Ieyasu, Katsunari attacked Sanada's troop with about 600 men from the west of Shoai-in Temple. Sanada's corps, attacked from three sides, was finally destroyed. Otani Yoshiharu, a lieutenant of Yukimura, was killed by Katsunari's troops during the mop up operation. Katsunari planned his war banner at Sakura gate.

== After death of Ieyasu ==
For his effort in the war against Toyotomi Hideyori, Katsunari's domain of Kariya were increased from 30,000 koku into 60,000 koku. Katsunari were initially expected to receive domain increase to at least 200,000 koku. However, Ieyasu was furious and instead only give him the increase of 30,000 koku, since Katsunari already disobeyed Ieyasu's order twice during the war. After Katsunari protested this treatment, Hidetada, son of Ieyasu and de facto shogun, trying to calm him down and promised him another 100,000 koku increase after Ieyasu's death. Katsunari were calmed and Hidetada indeed fulfil his promise to brought 100,000 after his father's death.

Later in the same year, the shogunate moved his fief from Kariya Domain in Mikawa Province to Kōriyama Domain in Yamato Province (60,000 koku); then in 1619, when Fukushima Masanori was stripped from his domain, Katsunari received 40,000 koku increase from Masanori's domain, bringing his total domain possession into 100,000 koku. Meanwhile, his original domain was transferred into Fukuyama Domain in Bingo Province (100,000 koku). On August, When Katsunari entered this area, he planned to build a new castle on a small hill on Jokoji because the existing Kannabe Castle was small and inconvenient. Furthermore, Katsunari learned Kannabe Castle has been captured in battles three times historically, which also became his reason to relocate the center of the domain to Mount. Jokoji, where the new castle was named Fukuyama castle.

In 1620, the construction of Fukuyama castle began, and its structures was done in 1625, although it was not fully completed until 13 years later. It was reported the peoples of Fukuyawa were satisfied with Katsunari rule in their domain. The reason of this castle being built was Katsunari were expected to become a bulwark on the Sanyōdō highway against possible rebellion by the powerful tozama daimyō of western Japan, such as the Mōri clan. Mizuno found that Kannabe Castle was located in a narrow mountain valley and was inconvenient both to manage his domain and to defend against attack, some received a special exception from the shogunate's "one domain - one castle" rule to build a new castle and castle town on reclaimed land. Later, Katsunari built Matsumoto Castle with special permission from the Shogun, while Fukuyama Castle also in its construction progress.

In 1622, Construction of the Fukuyama castle was completed. Furthermore, as Katsunari observed around the Fukuyama domain, he found that Hashirajima island was located off the coast of Tomonoura, an important port in the domain, and therefore it was necessary to build a defense base. If the traffic of ships in the area increased, it would be a perfect place to wait for the wind and tide, but it was uninhabited. So, Katsunari mobilize groups of volunteer settlers to build the infrastructures and inhabit the island, with the condition special privilege for those settlers of no tax obligation for them. Then, the clan of Murakami Tarobei Yoshimitsu of Tsuneishi, Numakuma County, volunteered. Katsunari then agree and granted Yoshimitsu all rights to govern the islands autonomously, including agriculture and fishing. After being appointed to control Fukuyama Domain by the Tokugawa shogunate, Katsunari employed many former daimyo and jobless samurai who has been disenfranchised after the war, including Mimura Chikanari, his another former lord who once hosted Katsunari during his wandering years from 1584 to 1598.

=== Tokugawa Iemitsu reign ===
In 1626, Mizuno Katsunari accompanied the third Shogun, Iemitsu, to Kyoto, and was promoted to the fourth rank and was granted an additional 1,000 koku of land in Atsugi Village, Aiko district, Sagami Province.

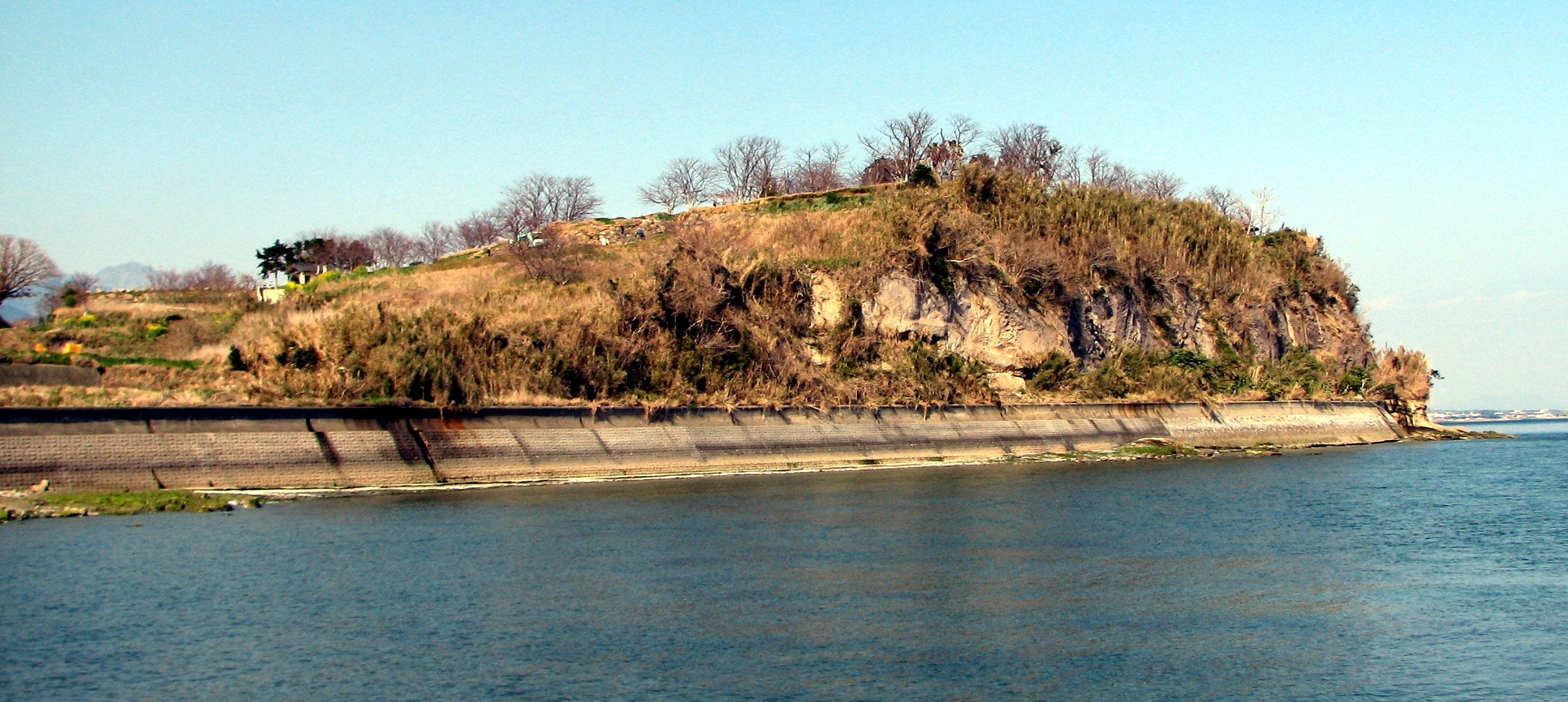
Remains of Hara castle, fortress of Shimabara rebels

In 1638, After the completion of Fukuyama Castle and the initial castle town, Katsunari were forced to suspend land reclamation project in Fukuyama as there is a rebellion broke out in Shimabara, Nagasaki. Katsunari was ordered by the shogunate to lead his troops to put down the Shimabara Rebellion in Kyushu. It was reported that Katsunari brought 430 cavalry and 6,333 infantry for this campaign. In January 3, Katsunari joined the Shogunate army of 100,000 soldiers in Fukuyama unfer the commands of Mataudaira Nobutsuna and Toda Ujikane. Miyamoto Musashi allegedly also participated in this suppression of Christian rebels. In "Munekyu (Katsunari)-sama's Story" record, which is a collection of things that Katsunari Mizuno said after his retirement in 1639, there is a story about Mizuno's army during the Shimabara Rebellion, where a man named Miyamoto Musashi entered the camp of general Ogasawara Nagatsugu, and Musashi has said, "Last year, (Mizuno Katsunari) Hyuga-no-Kamidono's family had this, and his army was well known and he had no plans." Musashi further continues by saying, "He is a great general that no one can match.". Regarding the operation, It is recorded the army of Katsunari tasked as vanguard and now led by his son, Katsutoshi. However, during a clash, the army of Mizuno clan were suffered more than 100 soldier casualties. According to historian Hirai Takato, this was the only recorded battle where the army of Katsunari suffered more than 100 losses. On the final phase of this rebellion, After Itakura Shigemasa at the hand of the rebels was killed in battle during the Shimabara Rebellion, his son, Itakura Shigenori led an all-out attack immediately afterwards as a battle to avenge his father's death. Katsunari praised Shigenori's military achievements and sent him a scepter as recognition of his bravery.

After the rebellion in Shimabara was pacified, Katsunari was then retired from the Mizuno clan's position to his successor, and decided to focus his works on the land reclamation project which suspended before the war. Up until 1637, and show that the agricultural policies implemented by Katsunari were inherited by the Mizuno domain and achieved great results. Since Katsunari's construction of the castle town of Fukuyama, the domain's development and reclamation had consistently covered all costs, reducing the burden on farmers and townspeople, and giving land to settlers free of charge.

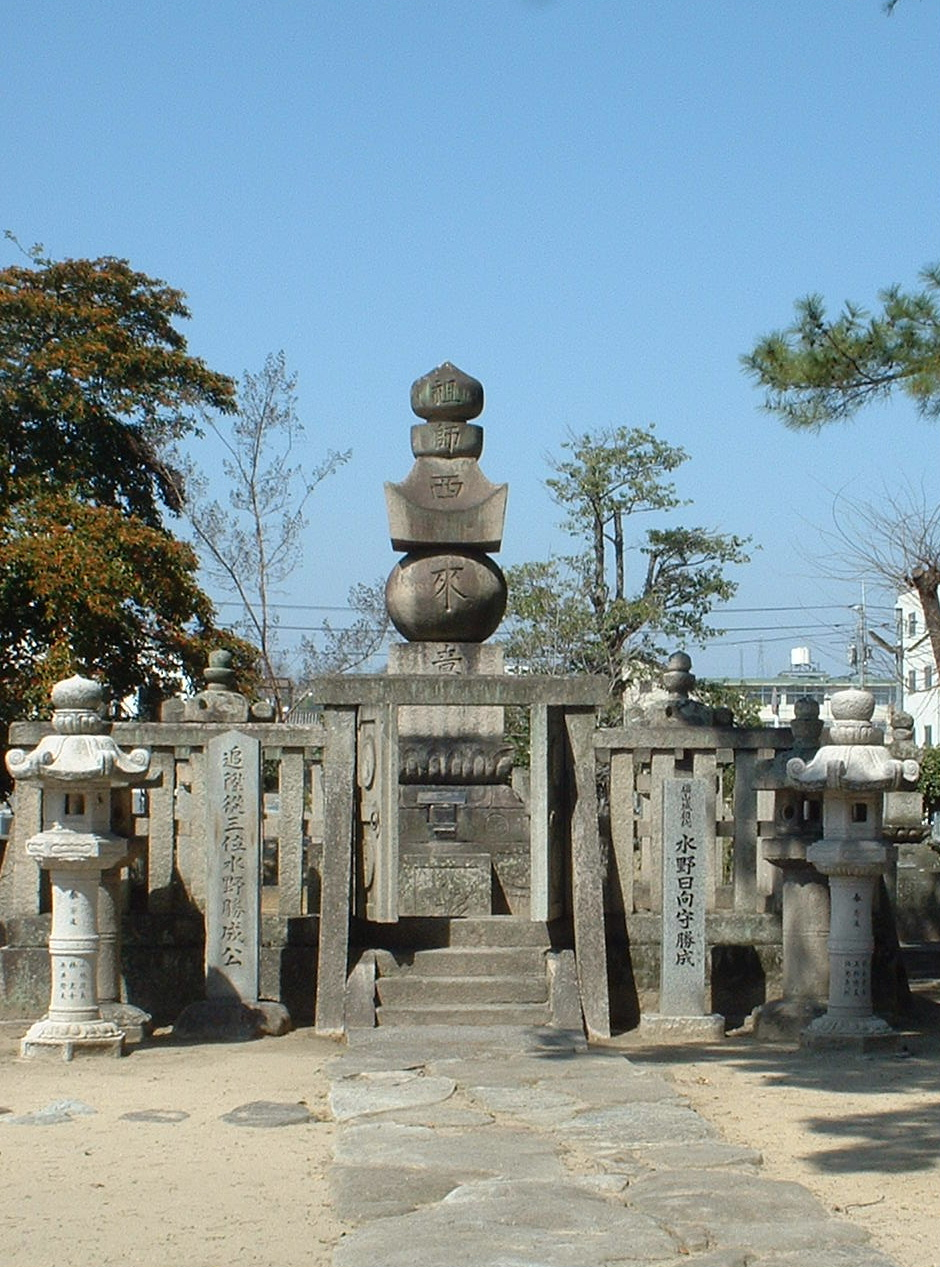
Grave of Mizuno Kazunari

In 1645, Katsunari completed the Hattori Pond which store water flowing from the Hattori River. Katsunari improved these waterways and embankments to turn the land into good rice fields.

in 1646, Katsunari also built the Senken embankment connecting Mount Fukatsu Ojiyama to Mount Kajishima.

In 1651, he died at Fukuyama Castle at the age of 88. His remains were interred at Kenchu-ji, the Mizuno family temple near Fukuyama Castle.

The line of his direct descendants ended in 1698. In 1919, Katsunari was posthumously elevated to the lower third rank of the Imperial Court.

== Personal Info ==
There are some quote which attributed to Mizuno Katsunari

There is no distinction between high and low ranked samurai. This world could work only when lords and servants rely on and support each other.

Mizuno Katsunari, quote from Jōzan kidan book authored by Jōzan Yuasa.

Mizuno Katsunari was considered as one of Fudai daimyō. He also said to be a master of dual wield sword fighting martial art.

Being violent and murderous during his youth, Katsunari's personality is comparable to his friend, the legendary swordsmen Miyamoto Musashi, in term of temperament. Musashi himself also reportedly praised Katsunari as "great general" during the suppression of Shimabara rebellion. It was theorized that he and Musashi were somewhat related through Mizuno Tadashige, his father. Mikinosuke, Musashi's adopted son, was the grandson of Katsunari's military prefect.

On the aftermath of Sekigahara battle, when Ishida Mitsunari, Konishi Yukinaga, and Ankokuji Ekei was caught, and being paraded around Osaka and Sakai before executed, Katsunari covered Yukinaga, his former lord, with straw hat to shield Yukinaga's head from the heatstroke. It was suggested by the author who recorded the occasion that it was a gesture of Katsunari's gratitude towards Yukinaga, who has sheltered him during Katsunari's wandering year.

An eccentric figure with colorful personality, Mizuno Katsunari also hosted Kabuki troupe in Kyoto at 1608, and taking one of the performer as concubine. He also reportedly liked Noh theater.

== Legacy ==
In the Edo period painting, Katsunari was depicted as one of the Tokugawa 28 generals (Tokugawa nijūhachishinshōjin).

In modern time, the Dō (armour) set of Mizuno Katsunari were preserved in Kariya city history museum. Its Kabuto helmet is a ledge -shaped helmet, a wider part of the head, planted with a horse's kasuma on a head bowl on a headquarters connected with five iron pieces. The forehead, which is layered by layered ears and large wrinkles, is painted with flesh -colored lacquer, imitating an old soldier with a hundred battles. Comes with a face cheek with a beard. The second set of armour which belonged to Katsunari were preserved in Fukuyama Castle museum. The Kabuto helmet of this armour set has unusual shape called a karagata helmet planted with bears on the surface which was said aimed to intimidate the enemy. A decoration called a lion's bite that expresses the lion is biting the teeth is attached. In addition, the whole is finished with tea lacquered, combined with the bear's hair to create a terrible atmosphere. On the left side is a trace shot with a gun, and it can be said that it is an armor that conveys the heroic heroism of the battlefield that runs around the battlefield. This armor belonged to the Mizuno clan which donated it to Kendaji Temple in 1964.

In 2014, on May, The Mito Prefectural History Museum in Midori-cho, Mito City is holding a thematic exhibition which covered the history of the rule of Mizuno clan of the city. One of document which exhibited was a letter with a signature from Toyotomi Hideyoshi for Katsunari.

As first lord of Kariya domain, modern time Kariya city celebrated Katsunari as folk hero and commemorated annual festival in tribute of him.

== Appendix ==
=== Bibliography ===
- Asakura, Haruhiko; Miura, Ichiro (1996). 世界人物逸話大事典 [Encyclopedia of Anecdotes about World Figures] (in Japanese). Kadokawa Shoten. ISBN 4040319001.
- Hirai, Takato (1992), 福山開祖・水野勝成 [Mizuno Katsunari the founder of Fukuyama], 新人物往来社, ISBN 4404019181
- Kusudo Yoshiaki (2009). 戦国名将・智将・梟将の至言. 学研M文庫. 学習研究社. p. 14. ISBN 978-4-05-901239-9.
- Toshikazu Komiyama (2002). 井伊直政家臣団の形成と徳川家中での位置 [Formation of Ii Naomasa's vassals and their position within the Tokugawa clan]. 学習院史学 (Thesis). Gakushuin University Historical Society. pp. 50～66. hdl:10959/988.
- Taniguchi, Katsuhiro (1995). Takagi Shōsaku (ed.). 織田信長家臣人名辞典 [Dictionary of names of Oda Nobunaga vassals]. 吉川弘文館. pp. 412–413. ISBN 4642027432.
- Fukuda Masahide (2003). 宮本武蔵研究論文集 [Miyamoto Musashi Research Papers] (in Japanese). 歴研. ISBN 978-4947769220.

=== Further reading ===
- Mizuno Katsunari (1819). Naomichi, Nakamura (ed.). 水野勝成記. 上,中,下巻 / 水野日向守 録 [Mizuno Katsunari Ki. Volumes 1, 2, and 3 / Mizuno Hinatamori Record....Mizuno Katsunari Memorandum] (in Japanese). Waseda University Library.
- 牛歩老人 (2022). 武将と愛刀 鬼日向…水野勝成 [Warlord and his beloved sword; Hyūga demon... Mizuno Katsunari] (in Japanese). pp. 20–26.
- 山上 至人 (2021). "鬼日向"と呼ばれた武辺者の生涯 倫魁不羈 水野勝成 [Katsunari Mizuno, a lifetime of the Takabe, who was called "Hyūga demon"] (in Japanese). 歴史群像. pp. 68–82.
