= Fukuyama Domain =

Administrative division in western Japan during the Edo period (1619-1871)

Fukuyama Domain 福山藩
- Domain of Japan
- 1619–1871
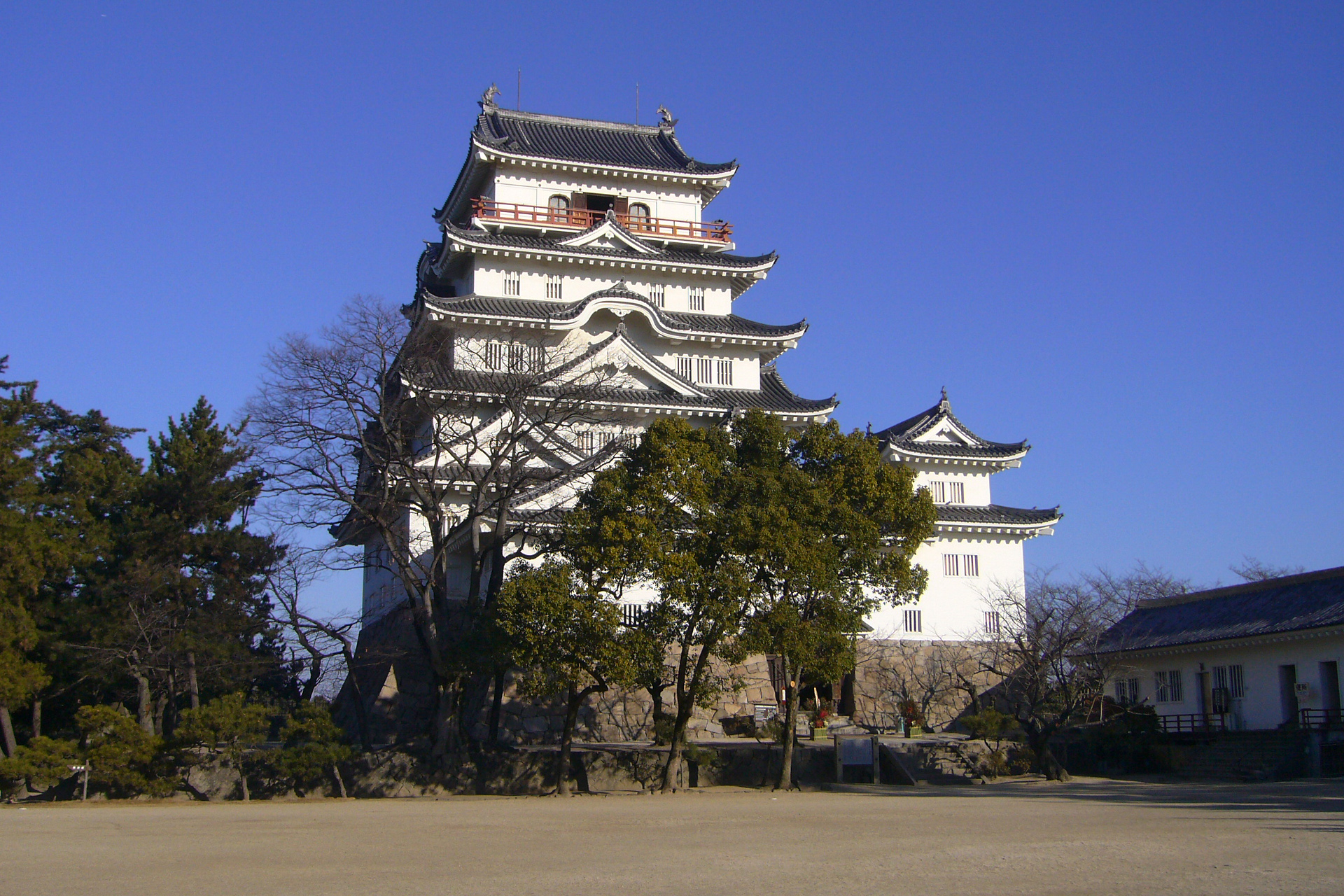
- Fukuyama Castle

- Mon of the Abe clan
- Capital: Fukuyama Castle
- Area
  - Coordinates: 34°29′27.74″N 133°21′40.04″E
- Historical era: Edo period
  - Established: 1619
  - Abolition of the han system: 1871
- Contained within
  - Province: Bingo Province
- Today part of: Hiroshima Prefecture

Location of Fukuyama Castle
Fukuyama Domain (Japan)

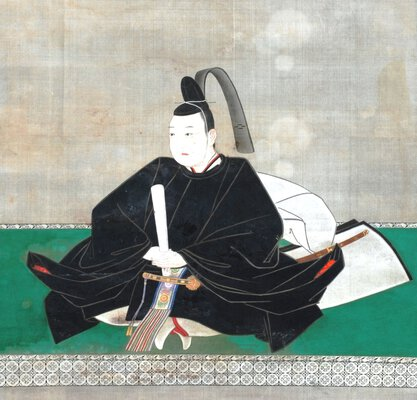
Abe Masahiro 7th daimyo of Fukuyama

Fukuyama Domain (福山藩, Fukuyama-han) was a feudal domain under the Tokugawa shogunate of Edo period Japan, in what is now southeastern Hiroshima Prefecture. It controlled much of Bingo Province and a small portion of Bitchū Province. It was centered around Fukuyama Castle. It was ruled in its early history by a branch of the Mizuno clan, and later the Abe clan. Fukuyama Domain was dissolved in the abolition of the han system in 1871 and is now part of Hiroshima Prefecture. It was called Bingo-Fukuyama Domain (備後福山藩, Bingo-Fukuyama-han) in the early Meiji period to distinguish it from Matsumae Domain, which was also popularly called "Fukuyama Domain" at the time.

== History ==
After the 1600 Battle of Sekigahara, Fukushima Masanori controlled Bingo and Aki Provinces. In 1619, the Tokugawa shogunate used the pretext that he had made repairs to Hiroshima Castle without permission to seize a portion of his domain, awarding a 100,000 koku portion of Bingo Province to Tokugawa Ieyasu's cousin, Mizuno Katsunari. Mizuno had an outstanding military record and it was expected that he would act as a bulwark on the Sanyōdō highway against possible rebellion by the powerful tozama daimyō of western Japan, such as the Mōri clan. Fukuyama Castle was complete in 1622 and under Mizuno rule, the area greatly prospered, with numerous public works and civil engineering projects to increase irrigation, open new rice fields and industrial development. Fukuyama Domain played a major role in the suppression of the Shimabara Rebellion in 1638. After Mizuno Katsunari's death in 1651, he was succeeded by his son Katsutoshi and grandson Katsusada, and great-grandson Katsuane, who continued his policies, increasing the domains kokudaka to 130,000 koku. However, Katsutane's sudden death in 1697, made his one-year old son Katsumi the 5th daimyō. Mizuno Katsumi died at the age of two in 1698 and the domain was subject to attainder. The popularity of Mizuno rule was such that numerous retainers and townspeople tried to besiege Fukuyama Castle to prevent a transfer of power, but were forced to disperse after Mizuno Katsunaga, one of Mizuno Katsunari's grandsons was given the 10,000 koku Nishiya Domain in Noto Province to preserve the line of succession.

Fukuyama Domain became tenryō territory ruled by a magistrate dispatched by the shogunate, who established a jin'ya in the Miyoshi neighborhood at the eastern end of the castle town. The Kyogoku clan of Marugame Domain was assigned the role of castellan of Fukuyama Castle. The shogunate also conducted an extensive land survey, reaching the conclusion that the kokudaka of the territory was actually 150,000 koku due to improvements made under Mizuno rule.

In 1700, the shogunate revived Fukuyama Domain by assigning 100,000 koku to Matsudaira Tadamasa of Yamagata Domain, with the remaining territory retained by the shogunate. However, Matsudaira Tadamasa did not actually enter his new domain until 1709 and was transferred to Kuwana Domain in Ise Province only a year later in 1710. In his place, the shogunate assigned Abe Masakuni from Utsunomiya Domain at the same 100,000 koku level. The Abe clan would continue to rule the domain for 10 generations over 161 years until the Meiji restoration. During this period, the clan produced four rōjū, the most famous of whom was Abe Masahiro, the 7th daimyō, who played a major role in Bakumatsu period politics and who was a signer of the Convention of Kanagawa. As the Abe clan was so heavily involved in the administration of the shogunate, they had little interest in the actual management of the territory and rarely visited the domain in person, remaining in Edo and relying on appointed managers. In addition, the Abe clan had much greater expenses than other daimyō due to their political role, and consequently the financial state of the domain was precarious, and was often subject to peasant uprising due to high taxes. Many farmers fell into ruin due to heavy taxes and famine, resulting in an oligopoly of farm ownership into the hands of a small clique of 'wealthy farmers' by the end of the Edo period.

In 1852, 10,000 koku was added to the domain due to the success of Abe Masahiro in directing the reconstruction of the western bailey of Edo Castle, bringing the total kokudaka to 110,000 koku. He also opened han schools in Edo and in Fukuyama.

In 1864, Fukuyama Domain was ordered by the shogunate to participate in the First Chōshū expedition, and Abe Masakata, marched to Hiroshima with about 6,000 clan soldiers. At the end of 1866, as Abe Masakata prepared to depart for the San'in region to participate in the Second Chōshū expedition, the gunpowder stored in Fukuyama Castle exploded and three yagura turrets were lost. In the following year, Fukuyama Domain was defeated by a Chōshū army led by Ōmura Masujirō in Iwami Province. The survivors retreated to Fukuyama Castle, and as the domain's finances were exhausted, the domain solicited donations from wealthy farmers and townsmen in exchange for samurai status and privileges. During the Boshin War, Fukuyama Castle was attacked by the Chōshū army in January 1868, encircling the castle. At the time, the domain was without a leader as Abe Masakata had died of illness shortly beforehand. Local Confucian scholar Sando Tokage and chief retainer Miura Yoshitake negotiated a change of allegiance, and the Chōshū forces withdrew before the castle or town were subject to bombardment. Later that year, the Meiji government tested Fukuyama's loyalty by ordering the dispatch of Fukuyama troops to various locations in Shikoku, Harima and finally to the Battle of Hakodate in Ezo. The domain had concealed the death of Abe Masakata, and the younger brother of the daimyō of Hiroshima Domain, Asano Naganobu was posthumously adopted, changing his name to Abe Masatake. Under his command, 500 soldiers from the domain fought in Hakodate with 25 dead and 28 injured.

In 1869, Abe Masatake was appointed imperial governor of Fukuyama. In 1871, the Fukuyama Domain became Fukuyama Prefecture with the abolition of the han system, with the portions of the domain in Bingo Province eventually becoming part of Hiroshima Prefecture in 1876.

== Holdings at the end of the Edo period ==
As with most domains in the han system, Fukuyama Domain consisted of several discontinuous territories calculated to provide the assigned kokudaka, based on periodic cadastral surveys and projected agricultural yields.

- Bingo Province
  - 29 villages in Fukatsu District (entire district)
  - 43 villages in Numakuma District (entire district)
  - 28 villages in Ashida District (entire district)
  - 21 villages in Honji District (entire district)
  - 27 villages in Yasuna District
  - 15 villages in Jinseki District
- Bitchū Province
  - 2 villages in Kawakami District

== List of daimyō ==
#	Name	Tenure	Courtesy title	Court Rank	kokudaka
Mizuno clan, 1619–1698 (fudai)
1	Mizuno Katsunari (水野勝成)	1619 - 1639	Hyūga-no-kami (日向守)	Junior 4th Rank, Lower Grade (従四位下)	101,000 koku
2	Mizuno Katsutoshi (水野勝俊)	1639 - 1655	Mimasaku-no-kami (美作守)	Junior 4th Rank, Lower Grade (従四位下)	101,000 koku
3	Mizuno Katsusada (水野勝貞)	1655 - 1662	Hyūga-no-kami (日向守)	Junior 4th Rank, Lower Grade (従四位下)	101,000 koku
4	Mizuno Katsutane (水野勝種)	1663 - 1697	Mimasaku-no-kami (美作守)	Junior 4th Rank, Lower Grade (従四位下)	101,000 koku
5	Mizuno Katsumine (水野勝岑)	1697 - 1698	-none-	-none-	101,000 koku
tenryō 1698 - 1700
Matsudaira (Okudaira) clan, 1700-1710 (Fudai)
1	Matsudaira Tadamasa (松平忠雅)	1700 - 1710	Sakon'e-no-shosho (左近衛少将)	Junior 4th Rank, Lower Grade (従四位)	100,000 koku
Abe clan, 1710–1871 (Fudai)
1	Abe Masakuni (阿部正邦)	1710 - 1715	Bitchū-no-kami (備中守)	Junior 4th Rank, Lower Grade (従四位下)	100,000 koku
2	Abe Masayoshi (阿部正福)	1715 - 1748	Ise-no-kami (伊勢守)	Junior 4th Rank, Lower Grade (従四位下)	100,000 koku
3	Abe Masasuke (阿部正右)	1748 - 1769	Iyo-no-kami (伊予守); Jijū (侍従)	Junior 4th Rank, Lower Grade (従四位下)	100,000 koku
4	Abe Masatomo (阿部正倫)	1769 - 1803	Ise-no-kami (伊勢守)	Junior 4th Rank, Lower Grade (従四位下)	100,000 koku
5	Abe Masakiyo (阿部正精)	1803 - 1826	Bitchū-no-kami (備中守); Jijū (侍従)	Junior 4th Rank, Lower Grade (従四位下)	100,000 koku
6	Abe Masayasu (阿部正寧)	1826 - 1836	Iyo-no-kami (伊予守)	Junior 4th Rank, Lower Grade (従四位下)	100,000 koku
7	Abe Masahiro (阿部正弘)	1836 - 1857	Ise-no-kami (伊勢守); Jijū (侍従)	Junior 4th Rank, Lower Grade (従四位下)	100,000 -> 110,000 koku
8	Abe Masanori (阿部正教)	1857 - 1861	Iyo-no-kami (伊予守)	Junior 5th Rank, Lower Grade (従五位下)	110,000 koku
9	Abe Masakata (阿部正方)	1861 - 1867	Kazue-no-kami (主計頭)	Senior 4th Rank, Lower Grade (正四位下)	110,000 koku
10	Abe Masatake (阿部正桓)	1867 - 1871	-none-	-none-	110,000 koku

== See also ==
- Abolition of the han system
- List of Han
