= Kumabe Chikanaga =

Kikuchi retainer

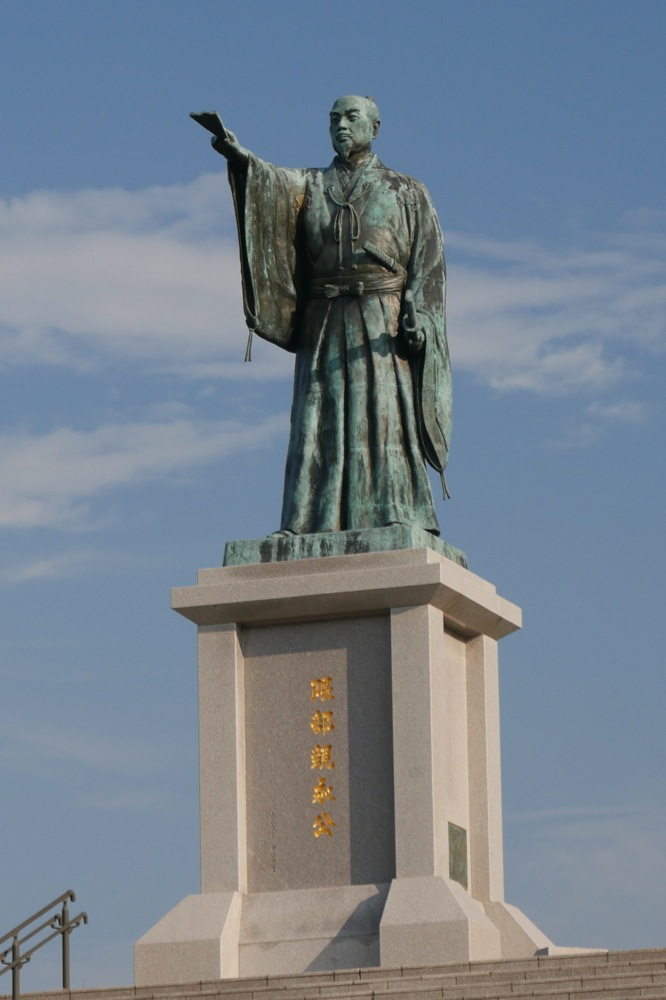

Kumabe Chikanaga (隈部 親永; 1516 - 1588) was a Kikuchi retainer, lord of Higo-Nagano Castle. He later served the Ryūzōji. He was defeated during Hideyoshi Toyotomi's conquest of Kyūshū. He died in the Higo riots.
