= Hoshizaki Castle =

Historic Japanese building

Coordinates: 35°05′23.8″N 136°56′05.3″E

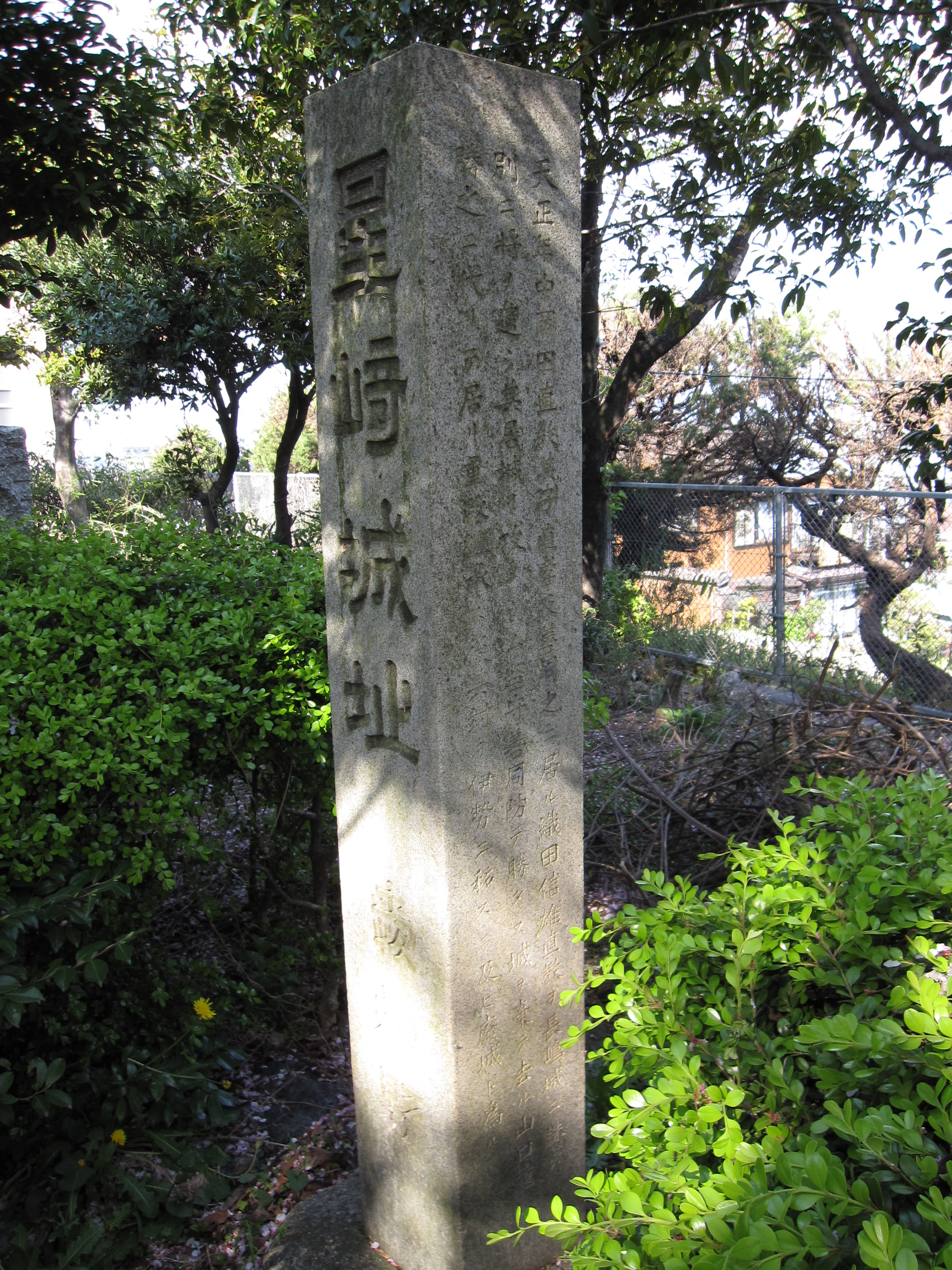
Stone memorial stele on the former site with brief description of the history of Hoshizaki castle (2009)

Hoshizaki Castle (Japanese: 星崎城, romanized: Hoshizaki-jō) was a Japanese castle in Motohoshizaki-chō (本星崎町) neighbourhood, today a part of Minami-ku, Nagoya Japan.

The origins of the castle, such as the date of construction, are unknown. The Okada family were in the beginning the lords of the castle. In the 16th century the Yamaguchi family succeeded them and held the castle for generations until it was abandoned by Yamaguchi Shigemasa, who moved in 1588.

There was the Honmaru enceinte, along with the Ninomaru and Sannomaru. Connected to the complex was the Hoshimiya Shrine (星宮社), which also served as a lighthouse for the nearby sea.

Today former parts of the castle are bisected by the Meitetsu railroad while another part houses the Kasadera school.

A memorial stele out of stone marks the place where the castle used to stand.

The area is served by the Moto Hoshizaki Station.
