= Fukuyama Castle =

Castle in Hiroshima Prefecture, Japan

Fukuyama Castle 福山城
- Fukuyama, Japan
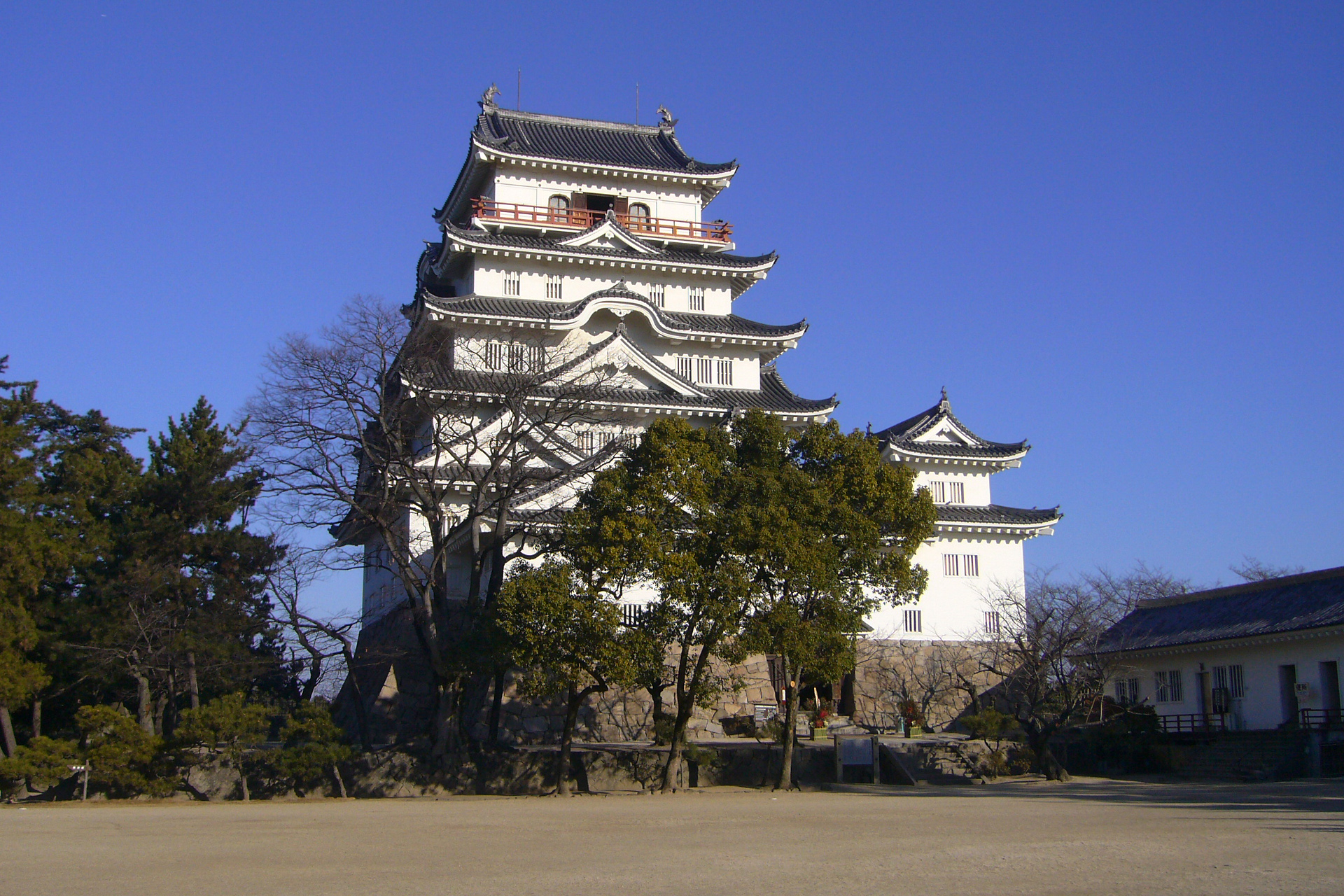
- Fukuyama Castle tenshu

Site information
- Type: Japanese castle
- Controlled by: Mizuno clan (1622-1700), Matsudaira Tadamasa (1700-1710), Abe clan (1710-1874), Japan (1874-present)
- Condition: Reconstructed, serves as history museum

Location
- Height: (five stories)

Site history
- Built: 1619-1622, rebuilt 1966
- Built by: Mizuno Katsunari
- In use: 1622-1874
- Materials: stone, wood, plaster walls (original); concrete, steel, wood, stone, plaster (reconstruction)
- Demolished: 8 August 1945

Fukuyama Castle (福山城, Fukuyama-jō), sometimes called Hisamatsu Castle (久松城, Hisamatsu-jō) or Iyō Castle (葦陽城, Iyō-jō) was the castle of the Bingo-Fukuyama Han during the Edo period of Japanese history. The grounds of the castle have been designate a National Historic Site since 1964. The castle is located in Fukuyama Park in Fukuyama, Hiroshima near Fukuyama Station.

== Overview ==
Fukuyama Castle is located at a hill in the center of Fukuyama city. Prior to the Edo Period, this area was a large tidal flat. The Sanyōdō highway, which connects the Kinai region with Kyushu, ran to the north of the modern city center, and Tomonoura, a port on the Seto Inland Sea from the Heian period, was to the south. The main power center for Bingo Province was at Kannabe Castle to the northeast. After the Battle of Sekigahara in 1600,Fukushima Masanori was awarded control of both Aki Province and Bingo Province; however, in 1619, the Tokugawa shogunate used the pretext that he had made repairs to Hiroshima Castle without permission to seize a portion of his domain, awarding a 100,000 koku portion of Bingo Province to Tokugawa Ieyasu's cousin, Mizuno Katsunari. Katsunari had an outstanding military record and it was expected that he would act as a bulwark on the Sanyōdō highway against possible rebellion by the powerful tozama daimyō of western Japan, such as the Mōri clan. Mizuno found that Kannabe Castle was located in a narrow mountain valley and was inconvenient both to manage his domain and to defend against attack, some received a special exception from the shogunate's "one domain - one castle" rule to build a new castle and castle town on reclaimed land. Construction started in 1619 and was completed in 1622.

The new Fukuyama Castle occupied a hill with a length of 400 meters and width of 200 meters. The inner bailey occupies the southern half of the hill, and contains a five-story tenshu at its northern edge. The southern edge was protected by two yagura turrets. The Fushimi yagura was a white three-story structure transferred from abolished Fushimi Castle in Kyoto. The Tsukumi yagura has a red handrail balcony. Between these two yagura is the main gate of the castle, also transferred from Fushimi Castle.

The secondary bailey occupied the north half of the hill, and outer bailey surrounded south half of the hill. Fukuyama Castle had seven three-story yagura and 15 smaller yagura, and tall stone walls, and was surrounded by water moats, connected by canal to the Seto Inland Sea.

The Mizuno clan was replaced by the Abe clan was rulers of Fukuyama Domain in 1698 and governed to the Meiji restoration. Although the various Abe daimyō played important political roles in the administration of the shogunate, they seldom visited the domain in person. During the Boshin War, Fukuyama Castle was attacked by the Chōshū army in January 1868, but the domain defected to the Imperial side and the castle was spared destruction.

== Current situation ==
After the Meiji Restoration, most of the buildings except for the tenshu and a number of yagura were demolished. The castle grounds became a public park. In 1931, the tenshu was designed a "National Treasure" under the former Cultural Properties Protection Law. However, the tenshu burned down during World War II. Much of outer areas of the castle grounds disappeared due to the construction of railways and urban development. Fukuyama Station was built directly adjacent to the inner bailey of the castle and the tenshu can be seen clearly from its platforms.

In 1947, the Fukuyama Industrial Exposition is held at the ruins of Fukuyama Castle. In 1950, the surviving Fushimi Yagura and Sugitetsu Gomon were designated National Important Cultural Properties. The tenshu was rebuilt in 1966 along with the Tsukumi yagura. In 1973, the Kagami yagura was reconstructed, and the bell tower in 1979. The Fukushima Museum of Art opened on the site of the west outer moat in 1988 and the Hiroshima Prefectural Museum of History on the ruins of the Sannomaru enclosure in 1989.

== Gallery ==
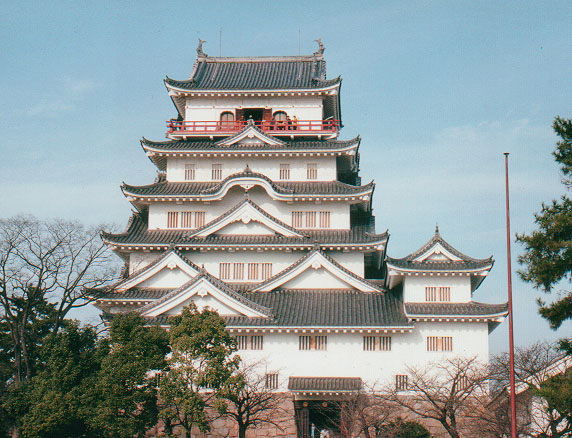
Tenshu

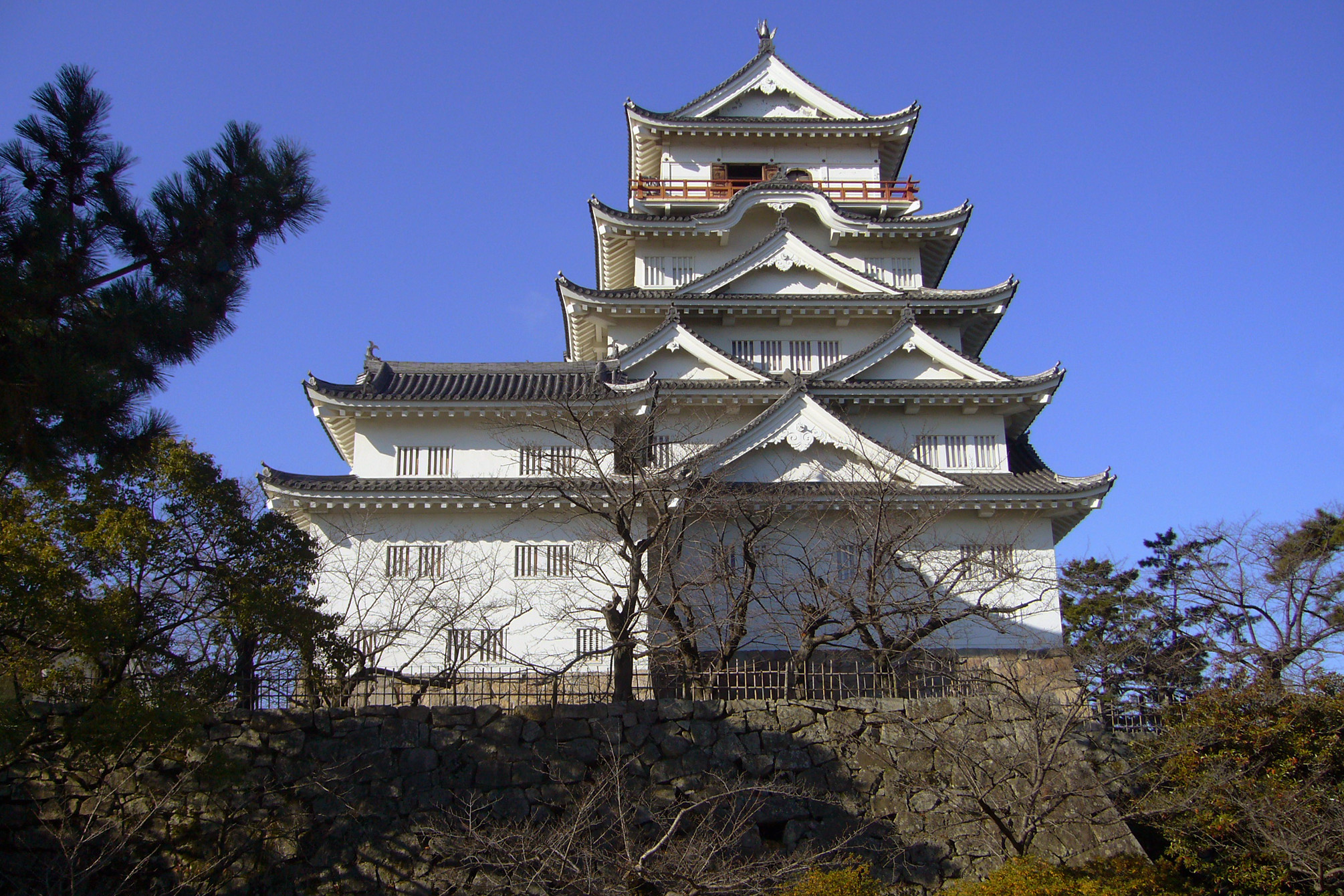
Tenshu, seen from the side.

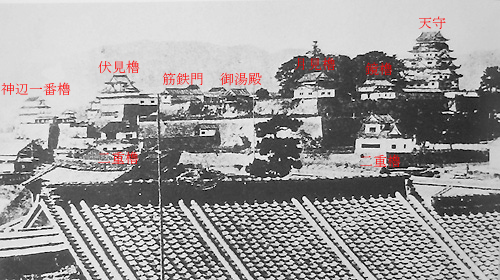
Panorama of the castle in 1873.

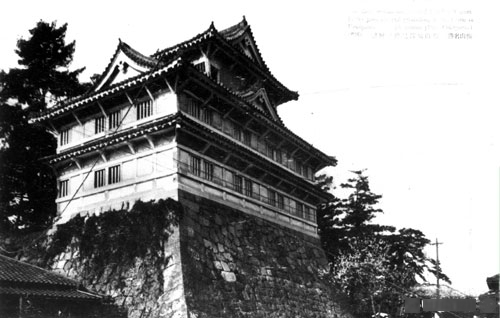
Fushimi Yagura (ICP) in 1934.

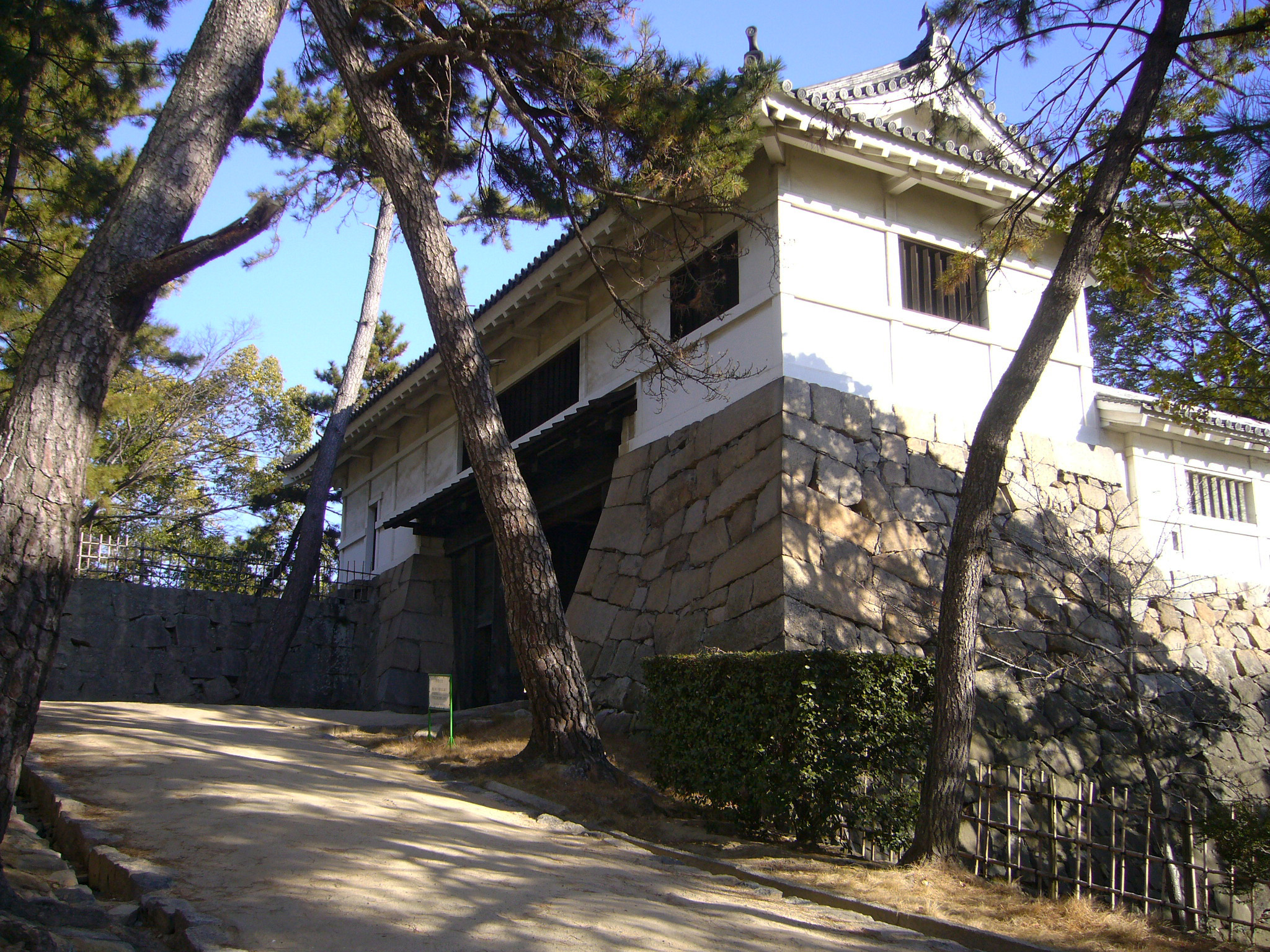
Sujigane Gate (ICP)

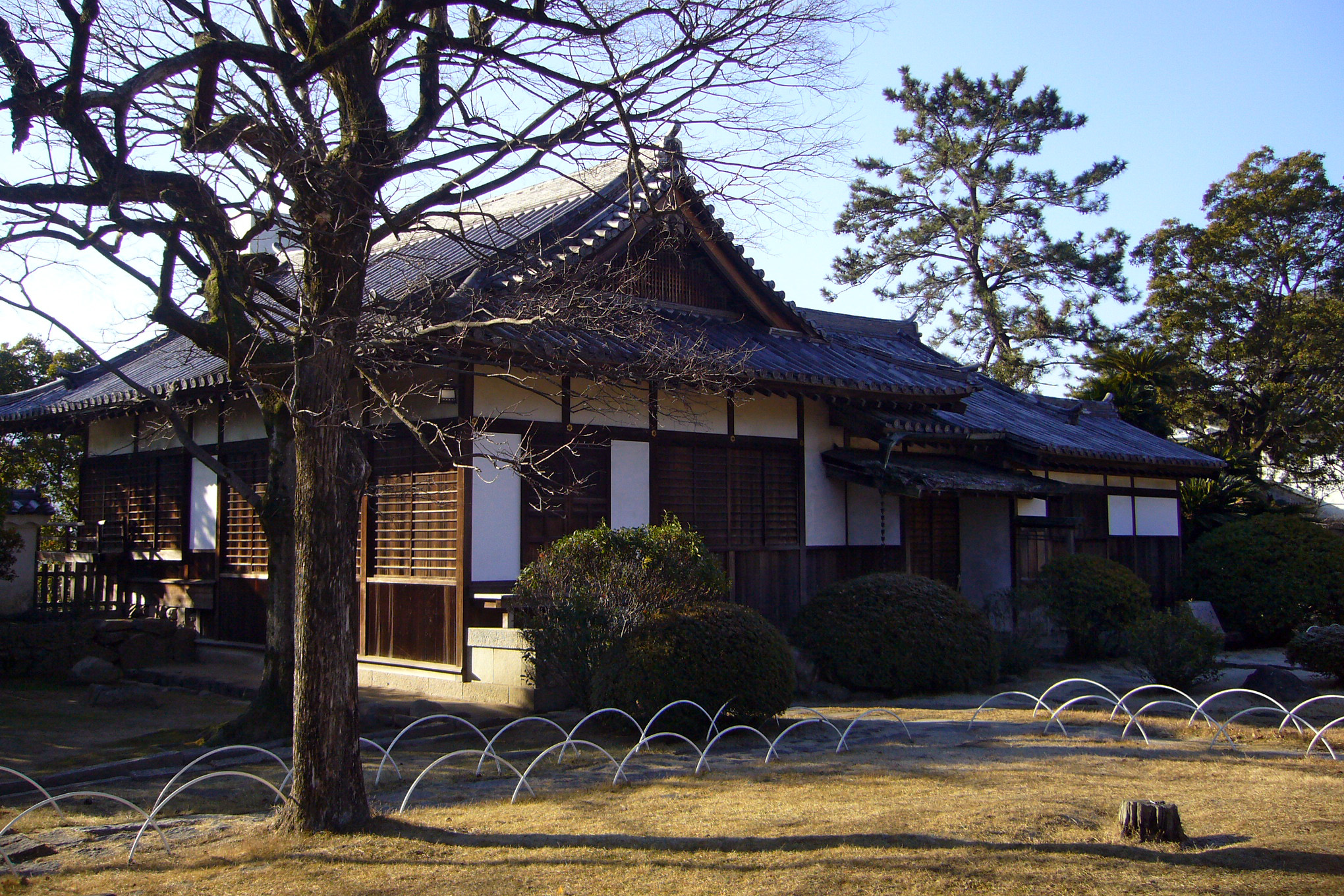
Bathhouse (Yudono).

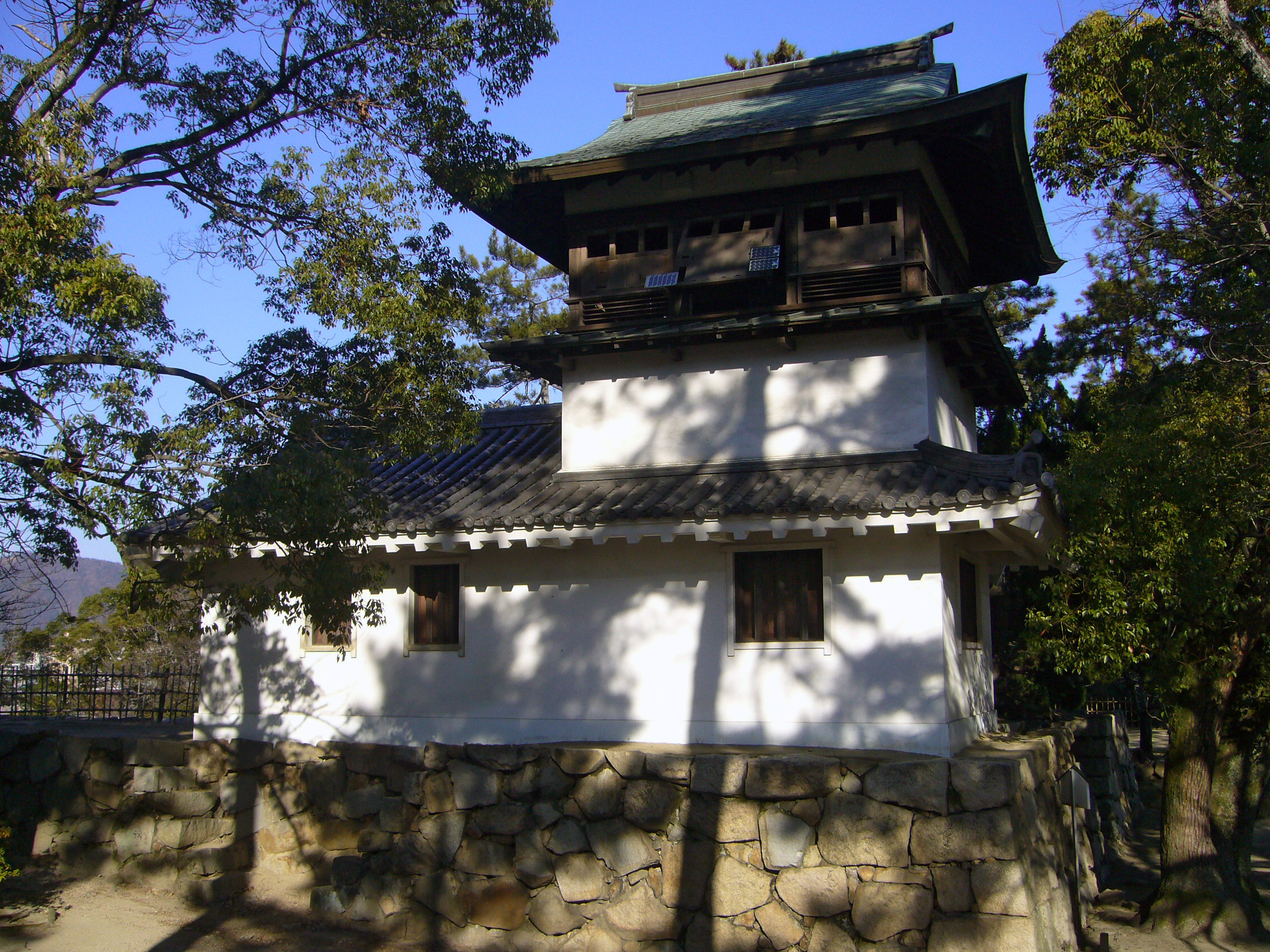
Kane Yagura.

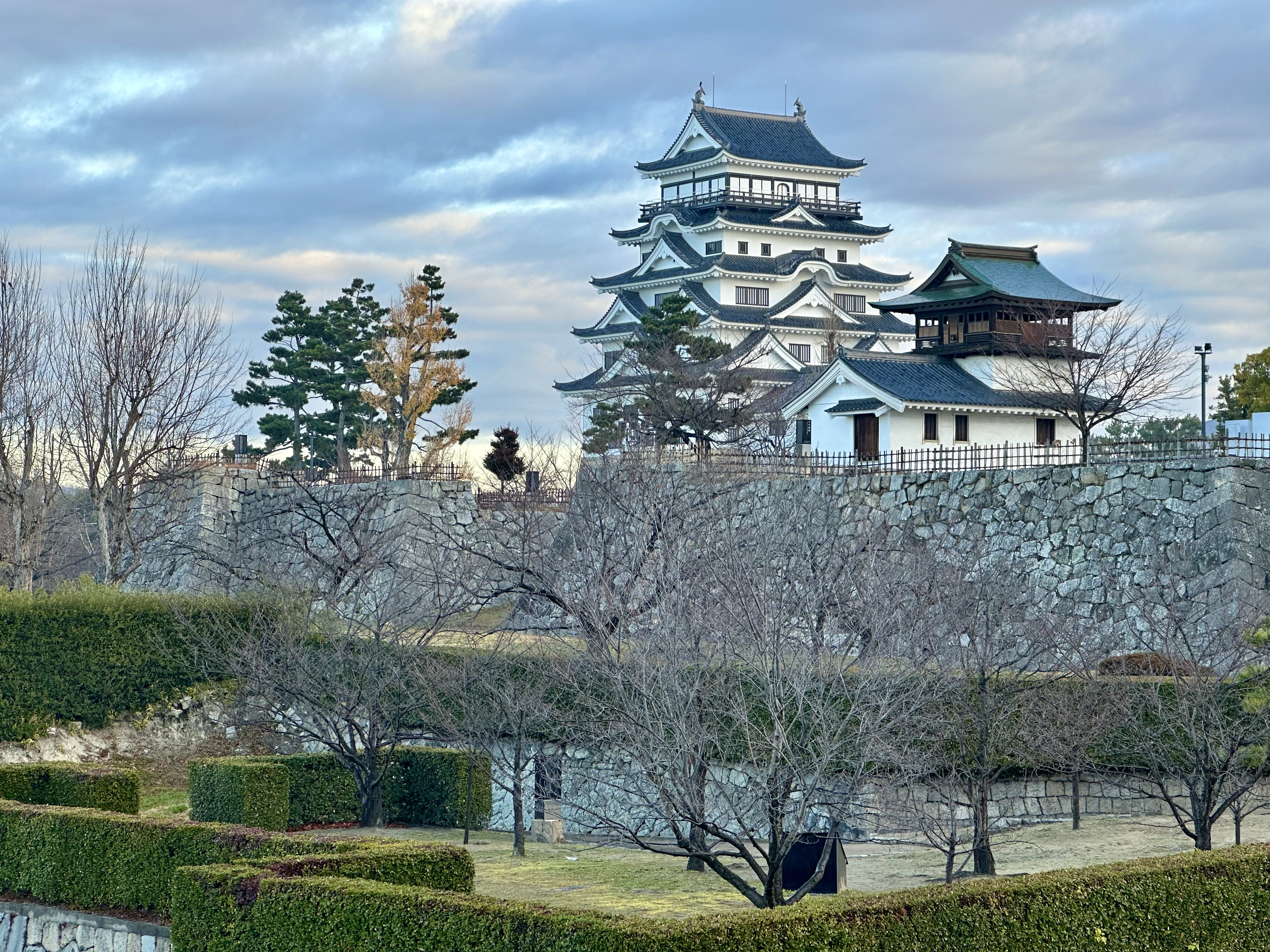
Fukuyama Castle from Fukuyama Station (2025)

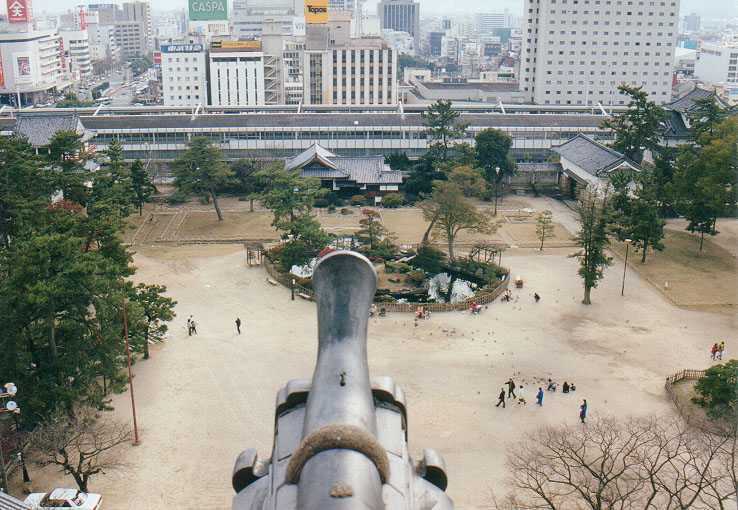
Inner Bailey

== See also ==
- List of Historic Sites of Japan (Hiroshima)

== Literature ==
- Benesch, Oleg and Ran Zwigenberg (2019). Japan's Castles: Citadels of Modernity in War and Peace. Cambridge: Cambridge University Press. p. 374. ISBN 9781108481946.
- De Lange, William (2021). An Encyclopedia of Japanese Castles. Groningen: Toyo Press. pp. 600 pages. ISBN 978-9492722300.
- Schmorleitz, Morton S. (1974). Castles in Japan. Tokyo: Charles E. Tuttle Co. ISBN 0-8048-1102-4.
