= Shiryu =

- Gender: Male

Origin
- Origin: Japanese
- Meaning: It means speed, "Purple Dragon". Different meanings depending on the kanji used

Shiryu (written: 紫龍) is a masculine Japanese given name meaning Purple Dragon.

== Written forms ==
The name's meaning is' purple dragon kanji spelled.

- 紫龍 "purple dragon"

== People ==
- Choun Shiryu (趙雲 子龍) (born 1978) Japanese professional wrestler
- Shiryu Fujiwara (藤原 志龍) (born 2000) Japanese footballer
- Morita Shiryū (森田 子龍) (1912–1998) Japanese artist
- Shiryu Hayashi (林 紫龍, born. during the Edo period (17th century) of Japan) a notable swordsman
- Kazuhiro "Kaz" Hayashi (born May 18, 1973) is a Japanese professional wrestler who has used the name Shiryu as an alias.

== Fictional characters ==
- Dragon Shiryū, a character from the manga and anime series Saint Seiya
- Shiryu of the Rain, a character from the manga and anime series One Piece
