= Matsui Okinaga =

Japanese samurai

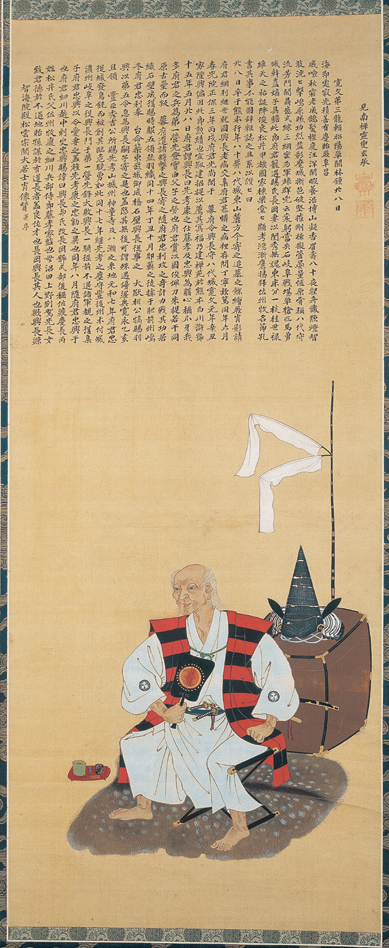
Matsui Okinaga

Matsui Okinaga (松井 興長, 1582 – July 24, 1661) also known as Nagaoka Sado (長岡 佐渡) was a Japanese samurai who served the Hosokawa clan, during the early Edo period (17th century). It was Nagaoka Sado himself who had protected Miyamoto Musashi as for him to be able to duel against the famous Sasaki Kojirō in 1612. At one time during the year of 1638, Musashi had met Sado. Sado had known at the time that Musashi was living in the house of Ogasawara, but he had learned that it was Musashi's son, Miyamoto Iori who had been under the service of the Ogasawara, and that Musashi was there as a guest. Sado had also learned that Musashi had no true intention of entering under the lord's service, and that he was only taking part in that battle (Ogasawara establishment in northern Kyūshū) as a staff in order to be an advisor to his son. After Sado had then returned to the province of Higo, he began planning the steps to get Musashi into the service of his fief, since he had already known that Lord Hosokawa Tadatoshi was interested in him. However, Tadatoshi had been previously schooled in the wisdom of the feudal system, in which he ordered for Musashi to act prudently, because Musashi's current situation as he had known, was residing within the house of Ogasawara, in relation to the fact that it would be a major mistake to show discourtesy.

Sado started out by first sending a letter to Musashi, because the steps for employment had to be taken very discreetly. Musashi had politely responded saying that he had no intention of having a lord. During the year of 1639, Sado had passed through the region of Kokura—within Kyūshū province—on his official business. Sado had taken this advantage to visit the house of Musashi's son in order to see Musashi, to whom he had communicated the wish of his lord, as well as his own. After not receiving a true answer, Sado departed, with Musashi later accepting the Hosokawa offer, as a guest, not a vassal. However, near the end of his life, Musashi was formally received as a retainer of Lord Hosokawa.
