= Shinmen Sokan =

Japanese daimyō

Shinmen Sokan (active 16th century) was a Japanese lord, daimyō of the Shinmen clan (新免氏, Shinmen-shi) during the middle of the Sengoku period. Sokan was known as a rather petty daimyō in the mountainous regions of Sakushu, which was west of Kyoto. Even though this was so, the Shinmen clan had very good ties with that of the Hirata family, leading to the Shinmen receiving substantial support. One such swordsman of note that served under Sokan was the famous Shinmen Munisai, the father of the legendary swordsman Miyamoto Musashi. In 1589, Sokan ordered Munisai to kill Honiden Gekinosuke (a minor student under Munisai) for unknown reasons. As a result, Munisai was forced to leave his village of Miyamoto.
