= Shinmen Munisai =

16th-century Japanese martial artist

- Born: Shinmen Munisai
- Died: from natural causes
- Native name: 新免無二斎
- Other names: Hirata Munisai
- Style: Kenjutsu
- Teacher: none verified

Other information
- Notable students: Miyamoto Musashi

Shinmen Munisai (新免 無二斎), also called Miyamoto Muninosuke, was a martial artist, expert in using the sword and the jitte. He was also the adopted father of the famous rōnin Miyamoto Musashi. He was the son of Miyamoto Musashi no kami Yoshimoto, a vassal of Shinmen Iga no Kami, the lord of Takayama Castle in the Yoshino district of Mimasaka Province. Munisai was relied upon by Lord Shinmen Sokan, the head of the Shinmen clan and so was allowed to use the Shinmen name. He was one of the few to have obtained the title of "Invincible Under The Sun", which was offered to him by the Shōgun Ashikaga.

Munisai founded his own ryūha: the Tōri Jitte Ryū, which was one of the schools taught to his adopted son Miyamoto Musashi, who conceived the Hyōhō Niten Ichi-ryū.

== Biography ==
According to the Kuroda clan records, Shinmen Munisai name appeared as a servant of Kuroda clan during the Sekigahara Campaign in 1600. This fueled the theory about his participation under Kuroda Yoshitaka in the battle of Ishigakihara when the Kuroda clan sided with Tokugawa faction.

=== Duel against the Yoshioka ===
Sometime after Ashikaga Yoshiteru became the Shōgun, he started in Kyoto a comparison duel between Munisai, who was still called Hirata at the time, and the founder of the Yoshioka-ryū school of sword-fighting: Yoshioka Kenpo (who was also the sword instructor of the Ashikaga). Kenpo won the first match, while Munisai won the other two. This event later started a feud between Munisai's son Miyamoto Musashi and the following generation of the Yoshioka family. Munisai having won the match, the shōgun gave him the title of "Invincible Under The Sun".

=== Recruited by the Shinmen clan ===
Having heard about Munisai, the head of the Shinmen clan, Shinmen Sokan, recruited Munisai as instructor of his troops. In 1589, for unknown reasons, Sokan ordered Munisai to kill his student Honiden Gekinosuke. After this event, he started training his son Musashi in the ways of the sword and of the jutte, but it didn't last long since the inhabitants of Miyamoto village, displeased with Gekinosuke's death, forced him to move away in the village of Kawakami.
