= Miyake (surname) =

Miyake is a Japanese surname. Notable people with the surname include:

== People ==
- Aiko Miyake (三宅 愛子; born 1978), Japanese swimmer
- Fusa Miyake, Japanese cosmic ray physicist
- Miyake Gunbei, vassal of Honda Tadamasa
- Hiromi Miyake (三宅 宏実; born 1985), Japanese weightlifter
- Ichiro Miyake (三宅 市郎; 1881–1964), Japanese mycologist
- Issey Miyake (三宅 一生; 1938–2022), Japanese fashion designer
- Jiro Miyake (三宅 二郎; ?–1984), Japanese football player
- Jun Miyake (三宅 純; born 1958), Japanese composer
- Kenta Miyake (三宅 健太; born 1977), Japanese voice actor
- Kiichi Miyake (三宅 驥一; 1876–1964), Japanese botanist
- Marc Miyake (三宅 英雄; born 1971), American linguist
- Naomi Miyake (三宅 なほみ; 1948–2015), Japanese cognitive scientist
- Sadahiko Miyake (三宅 貞彦; 1891–1956), World War II general in the Imperial Japanese Army
- Seiichi Miyake (三宅 精一; 1926–1982), Japanese inventor
- Miyake Setsurei (三宅 雪嶺; 1860–1945), Japanese philosopher
- Shiori Miyake (三宅 史織; born 1995), Japanese women's footballer
- Tadaaki Miyake (三宅 忠明; born 1939), Japanese folklorist
- Taro Miyake (1882–1935), Japanese wrestler
- Miyake Yasunobu (三宅 康信; 1563–1632), Japanese daimyō
- Yoshinobu Miyake (三宅 義信; born 1939), Japanese weightlifter
- Yukari Miyake (三宅 由佳莉; born 1986), Japanese female singer
- Yukiko Miyake (三宅 雪子; 1965–2020), Japanese politician
- Yuu Miyake (三宅 優; born 1973), Japanese composer and sound designer

== Characters ==
- Shinobu Miyake, a character from the manga series Urusei Yatsura
