= Miyamoto Mikinosuke =

Eldest adopted son of Miyamoto Musashi

- 宮本三木之助
- Parent: Miyamoto Musashi (adoptive father)
- Relatives: Kurōtarō (brother); Iori (adoptive brother); Yoemon (adoptive brother)

Miyamoto Mikinosuke (宮本 三木之助; 1604 – 1626) was a retainer of the Japanese clan of Honda during the Edo period of Japan. Mikinosuke was famous for being the first adopted son of the famous swordsman Miyamoto Musashi.

== Biography ==
=== Early life ===
Mikinosuke was the third son of Nakagawa Shimanosuke. (Note: Some authors claim that he was a grandson of Shimanosuke but they don't cite a specific source.) Shimanosuke served Mizuno Katsunari, a near vassal of Tokugawa Ieyasu who was Musashi's commander during the siege of Osaka castle. According to the Sekisui zatsuwa, Mikinosuke was also Musashi's paternal relative through Nakagawa Shimanosuke, who was also a vassal of Katsunari. It is almost certain that Shimanosuke died during the siege and it is likely that Musashi took custody of Mikinosuke as well as his younger brother Kurōtarō afterwards. Possibly due to a friendship between the men. Afterwards it appears their adopted father brought them to Hirafuku, where Musashi's stepmother Yoshiko was living with her husband, Tasumi Masahisa.

Another document also states that Mikinosuke was the grandson of Shinmen Sokan who was a cousin of Musashi.

=== Career ===
Sometime after 1617 Mikinosuke entered the service of the daimyō Honda Tadatoki who was the son of Honda Tadamasa whom Musashi knew from the same siege that killed Mikinosuke's father. In the spring of 1626 Tadatoki became sick in tuberculosis and by the middle of May his health had deteriorated extremely. Mikinosuke and another page named Iwahara Gyūnosuke helped Tadatoki's wife Senhime nurse their lord for several weeks while he became worse. Tadatoki eventually died the same year.

Some sources claim Mikinosuke was away in Edo when Tadatoki died.

=== Death ===
In line with tradition, Mikinosuke decided to commit suicide upon the death of his lord. The practice called junshi included self-immolation and decapitation. Beforehand Mikinosuke traveled to meet Musashi to say farewell. His father treated him to a large banquet and they spoke to each other. As tradition required, he performed the act in front of his master's grave on the sixth day following the latter's death. Before his death Mikinosuke wrote a jisei, a suicide poem. Upon him stabbing himself in the stomach his retainer Miyata Kanbei was the one who cut his head off.

Mikinosuke's grave is located at the Engyō temple, situated behind that of Honda Tadatoki and its inscription reads "Miyamoto Mikinosuke, adoptive son of Miyamoto Musashi: Having served Tadatoki and committed seppuku in front of his master's grave, a native of Ise, and adoptive son of Musashi, aged twenty-three." Right behind his grave Miyata Kanbei's own is located.

== Legends ==
Like many other aspects of his adopted father's life the meeting with Mikinosuke has been subject to mythologizing. One of the most common version follows:

One day Miyamoto Musashi had been traveling on horseback along the Settsu road. At a certain inn at Nishinomiya, Musashi had seen a boy of fourteen or fifteen who had taken Musashi's horse for him. Musashi had perceived extraordinary qualities from this boy—Mikinosuke. Musashi then asked the boy, "Wouldn't you like to become my son? I would find a good lord for you." Mikinosuke replied, "You are very kind to make such an offer, but I have old parents. The reason I am working as a hostler is to take care of them. If I became your adoptive son, my parents would immediately fall on hard times. I must therefore tell you no, with my thanks." Musashi had then gone to Mikinosuke's house and met his parents. Musashi then had explained his plans to them, receiving their consent to adopt him. He then took Mikinosuke with him after giving a small sum of supportive money to his parents.
