= Matabē =

Matabei
- Gender: Male

Origin
- Origin: Japanese
- Meaning: Different meanings depending on the kanji used

Matabē (又兵衛(またべえ)) is a masculine Japanese given name. Notable people with the name include:

- Gotō Matabē (後藤 又兵衛) (1565–1615), Japanese samurai
- Iwasa Matabē (岩佐 又兵衛) (1578–1650), Japanese artist
- Kijima Matabē (来島 又兵衛) (1817–1864), Japanese samurai
- Takada Matabē (高田 又兵衛) (1590–1671), Japanese swordsman

== See also ==
- Matabei (crater), impact crater on Mercury
