= Miyake =

Miyake may refer to:

== Places in Japan ==
- Miyake, Nara, a town located in Kansai
- Miyake, Tokyo, a village located in Tokyo
- Miyakejima, an island in the Izu Islands, often shortened to Miyake
- Miyakezaka, a neighborhood in Chiyoda, Tokyo, often shortened to Miyake
  - Miyakezaka JCT, a junction in Shuto Expressway

== Other uses ==
- Miyake (surname)
- Miyake Event, or 774–775 carbon-14 spike, and other exceptional carbon-14 spikes
- Miyake-daiko, a style of Japanese taiko drumming
