= Tadashima Akiyama =

17th century samurai

Tadashima Akiyama, also called Akiyama of Tajima (但馬国秋山, Tajima-no-kuni Akiyama, fl. 16th century), was a Japanese samurai of the Azuchi–Momoyama period who hailed from Tajima Province. A rather unknown figure, he is largely remembered for his defeat at the hands of the young Miyamoto Musashi, who was sixteen at the time. It has been concluded that Akiyama openly challenged Musashi.

Musashi wrote in The Book of Five Rings: "When I was sixteen I struck down an able strategist Tadashima Akiyama".
