= Takemura Yoemon =

Japanese swordsman

- 竹村与右衛門
- Other names: Miyamoto Yoemon; Hirao Yoemon; Takemura Yoemon Noritoshi
- Parent: Miyamoto Musashi (adoptive father)
- Relatives: Mikinosuke (adoptive brother); Kurōtarō (adoptive brother); Iori (adoptive brother)

Takemura Yoemon (竹村与右衛門; ? – ?) was a swordsman during the Edo period (17th century) of Japan. He was also possibly one of Miyamoto Musashi's adopted sons.

== Biography ==
=== Early life ===
Yoemon was descended from the paternal side of Miyamoto Musashi's family and was likely adopted by him at an unknown time.

The name "Takemura" was used by Musashi during later life.

=== Career ===
Yoemon was known throughout history as one of Miyamoto Musashi's most senior students. After Musashi had left the province of Owari, Yoemon received the successorship to the School of Musashi. Two swordsman of note that had propagated the School of Musashi as disciples under Yoemon were Takemura Masatoshi and Hayashi Shiryu. After Shiryu had been trained by Yoemon for a great length of time, Shiryu received the final transmission of the Enmei ryu from Yoemon.
