= Hayashi Shiryu =

Japanese swordsman

Hayashi Shiryu was a notable swordsman during the Edo period (17th century) of Japan. Shiryu originally was a student of the Hyōhō Niten Ichi-ryū style of swordsmanship before becoming a disciple under the famous Miyamoto Musashi. Before Shiryu had joined Musashi, he had dueled with him in a dojo. Musashi defeated him, in which he even lost consciousness after leaving the dojo. After reflecting on their duel, Musashi felt that Shiryu had shown considerable talent in the way he had fought, and thus his students took care of his recovery. Shiryu from then onward became a student under Musashi after he had completely recovered. After Musashi left the Owari region, Shiryu continued to study under the guidance of Takemura Yoemon, one of Musashi's senior students. After some time, Shiryu eventually received the final transmission of the Enmei ryu.
