= Kenji Tokitsu =

Japanese martial artist and scholar

Kenji Tokitsu (時津 賢児, Tokitsu Kenji, born 1 August 1947) is a Japanese author and practitioner of Japanese martial arts. Tokitsu has also written a scholarly work about the legendary swordsman Musashi Miyamoto. He holds doctorates in sociology and in Japanese language and civilization.

== Biography ==
Kenji Tokitsu was born on 1 August 1947 in Yamaguchi, Japan. A practitioner of Shotokan karate since youth, in 1984 Tokitsu started his own school, the Shaolin-mon ("door to Shaolin", compare the Mumonkan) school in Paris, where he had taught Shotokan karate since 1971. The Shaolin-mon teachings were a hybrid of Tokitsu's dissatisfaction with Shotokan karate combined with what he learned of Chinese martial arts. Still later, he founded the Tokitsu-ryu Academy in 2001.

He was interviewed for his thoughts on Japanese culture in Chris Marker's 1996 documentary film Level Five.

== Books ==
- Tokitsu, Kenji, The Inner Art of Karate: Cultivating the Budo Spirit in Your Practice, trans. 2012, ISBN 978-1-59030-949-0
- –––––, Ki and the Way of the Martial Arts, trans. 2003, ISBN 978-1-57062-998-3
- –––––, Miyamoto Musashi: His Life and Writings, trans. 2004 by Sherab Chödzin Kohn (from the French Miyamoto Musashi, 2000), Boston: Shambhala, ISBN 978-1-59030-045-9 (1st ed., hbk)
