= Reigandō =

Cave in Japan

Coordinates: 32°49′12″N 130°37′17″E

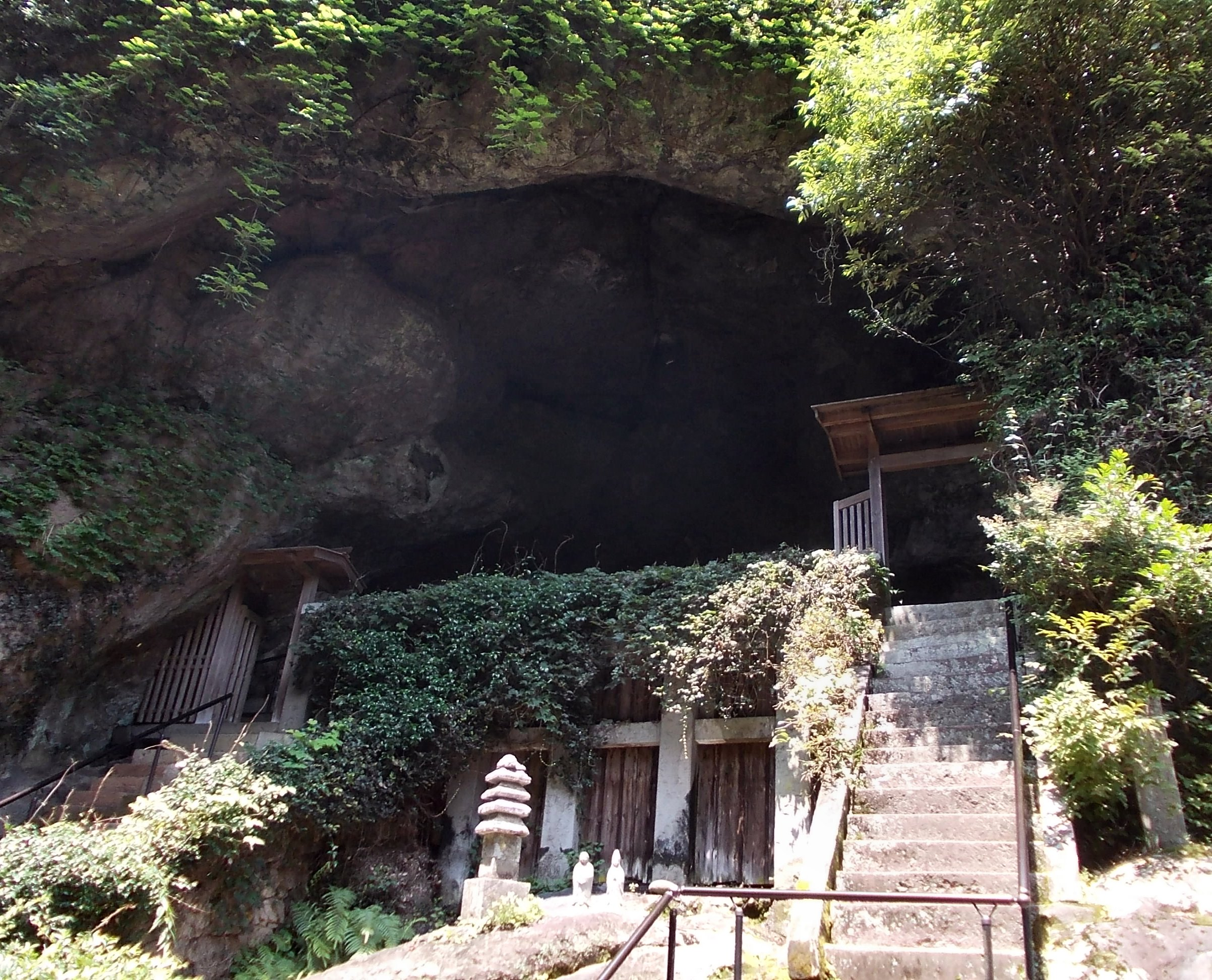
Reigandō

Reigandō (霊巌洞, meaning "Spirit Rock Cave") is a cave that lies to the west of Kumamoto, Japan, that became a temporary home to the legendary rōnin, Miyamoto Musashi. From 1643, Musashi spent many of his last months in the cave, meditating and writing his Book of Five Rings. The cave is accessed easily by bus from Kumamoto City and nearby Tamana.
