= Dokkōdō =

1645 book by Miyamoto Musashi

- Author: Miyamoto Musashi
- Original title: 獨行道
- Language: Japanese
- Publication date: 1645

The Dokkōdō (Japanese: 獨行道) (The Path of Aloneness, The Way to Go Forth Alone, or The Way of Walking Alone) is a short work on philosophy, written by the Japanese swordsman and strategist Miyamoto Musashi a week before he died in 1645. It consists of 21 precepts and was largely composed on the occasion of Musashi giving away his possessions in preparation for death. The work was dedicated to his favorite disciple who took the precepts to heart, Terao Magonojō, and to whom his earlier Go rin no sho (The Book of Five Rings) had been dedicated. Dokkōdō expresses a stringent, honest, and ascetic view of life.

Colin Hyakutake-Watkin, an author writing on martial arts in 1992, provided a translation of the early-seventeenth-century book as well as a review of the life of its author and his work. He also provides other reviews of the work that are both contemporaneous and contemporary on an online site entitled, Dokkōdō. Hyakutake-Watkin describes the work as based upon the earlier works, Hyoho Sanjukajo and Gorin-no-sho, by Musashi and that Dokkōdō appears to be a condensed version of his earlier works as a suggested code of conduct for Samurai. He also discusses some of the earlier Japanese philosophical works that are similar, both with known authors and those without known authors that may have inspired the philosophy developed by Musashi.
