= Shishido (swordsman) =

Japanese swordsman

Shishido (宍戸) is the family name of a Japanese swordsman believed to have been active in the early years of the Edo period (1603–1868). Legend has it that he was a skilled practitioner of the kusarigama (a metal chain attached to a kama and a weight, also known as the chain and sickle), and around the year 1607, he fought a duel against the swordsman Miyamoto Musashi, in which he was killed.

It is debatable whether Shishido actually existed or not. Author William Scott Wilson, in his 2004 book, The Lone Samurai, wrote, "In 1607, Musashi was passing through the province of Iga when he met a man known only by his family name, Shishido, who was a master of the sickle and chain."

The first record of Musashi's duel with Shishido is in the Nitenki (二天記), written in 1776, where he was named Shishido Nanigashi (宍戸某). In Eiji Yoshikawa's 1935–39 novel, Musashi, he was named Shishido Baiken (宍戸梅軒). If fictional, he may have been based on Shishido Ietoshi (宍戸家俊). If he existed, his family name was most likely Shishido, but it is uncertain if his given name was Nanigashi or Baiken.
