= Miyamoto Iori =

Samurai adopted by Miyamoto Musashi (1612–1678)

- 宮本 伊織
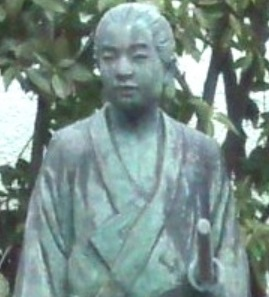
- Statue of Iori
- Born: November 13, 1612; Yoneda, Innami district, Hyōgo prefecture
- Died: May 18, 1678 (aged 65)
- Other names: Miyamoto Sadatsugu
- Parent: Miyamoto Musashi (adoptive father)
- Relatives: Mikinosuke (adoptive brother); Kurōtarō (adoptive brother); Yoemon (adoptive brother)

Miyamoto Iori (宮本 伊織; November 13, 1612 – May 18, 1678) was a samurai during the Edo period of Japan. Iori was an adopted son of legendary ronin Miyamoto Musashi.

== Early life ==
Iori was the adopted son of Miyamoto Musashi. He was adopted at the age of 11 by the master swordsman in 1623, when his adoptive father was 39 and living in Edo. The genealogy of Iori's grandson states that Iori was Musashi's nephew from his eldest brother.

== Career ==
Iori was a vassal of Ogasawara Tadazane, a Japanese samurai daimyō of the early Edo period. Iori's rise under Ogasawara's service was exceptionally fast. Iori entered at age 15 as a page and soon after, he became an official vassal. By 1632, Iori received 2500 koku and became one of Ogasawara's principal vassals. By 1638, his salary was increased by 1500 koku because of his efforts during the siege of Shimabara. At only 26, he had become Ogasawara's highest ranked vassal.

== Cultural depictions ==
- Miyamoto Iori is the main character of the Action-RPG Fate/Samurai Remnant. Set in the Fate/Stay Night multiverse in a timeline where in the 1650s, an imitation of the Holy Grail War known as the Waxing Moon Ritual is created in Japan which brings many mages and their spirit servants to the city of Edo to claim the wish from the Waxing Moon. Iori was one of Koei Tecmo's requested Servants, but when Kinoko Nasu saw Iori on their list of requests he said that they would only do Iori if he was the protagonist.
