= Miyake Gunbei =

17th-century Japanese vassal

Miyake Gunbei was a vassal who served Honda Tadamasa, the lord of the Himeji castle during the Edo period (17th century) of Japan. Nothing is known of his early life. His primary notability is due to an encounter with the famed swordsman, Miyamoto Musashi.

== Miyamoto Musashi ==
A few years after Tadamasa had established himself at Himeji as governor over the region, the famous Miyamoto Musashi opened a certain dojo in the town, and put up a sign that said, "Miyamoto Musashi, the number one adept of the sword in Japan." After Lord Honda saw this, in his fury, he ordered his most skilled retainer, Gunbei, to be sent to teach Musashi that he was not truly the greatest of swordsmen. Miyake then visited Musashi, who kept him waiting for more than an hour. Miyake then said, "What an ill-mannered man! Keeping me waiting. Me, one of the principal vassals of the fief, whereas he is a warrior without a lord!". After Musashi came out to see Gunbei, Musashi replied to Gunbei, "If I had been informed that the purpose of your visit was for us to measure ourselves against each other in combat, I would have come sooner. Only I was in the midst of playing Go with a guest. Would you care to come out in the garden? I will leave the choice of weapons up to you, either a real sword or a wooden sword, as you prefer.".

Miyake became very irritated after hearing these words from Musashi, but he recalled through his lord's orders that he was to test the abilities of Musashi, not to kill him. Before their duel began, Miyake cut a piece of bamboo that was within the garden and took it for his own weapon, while Musashi wielded his ordinary wooden sword. The combat ended in an instant, with Gunbei acknowledging that Musashi had lived up to his title. Gunbei then passed this information onto his lord.
