= Takada Matabē =

Takada Yoshitsugu (高田 吉次), also known as Hachibē (八兵衛) and later Matabē (又兵衛), was a retainer under lord of the Ogasawara during the Edo period (17th century) of Japan.

== Duel vs Miyamoto Musashi ==
Matabei was renowned as a famous adept of the art of the lance. While the famous swordsman Miyamoto Musashi was staying within Kokura, Matabei visited him at many times as to receive his unique teachings.

At one time the Lord of Ogasawara requested that Matabei to duel Musashi. Matabei was compelled to fight even though he did not want to, as he had to obey his lord's command.

Matabei chose to use a bamboo lance, while Musashi chose a practice sword made of wood. At the beginning of their duel, Matabei had at first attacked Musashi with his lance. In return Musashi had calmly penetrated Matabei’s guard, moving into close range using the middle-level guard and winning two times.

During the third bout, Matabei's lance had slid between Musashi's legs. Due to this fact, Musashi said, "I was touched, therefore I lost this time". Musashi had then told all of the onlookers how much of an adept Matabei was with the lance.

Later, after the duel, Matabei said, "Master Musashi is a true adept whom I was unable to touch. It was to save my face that he acted as though I had won once out of three times".
