= Tadaaki Miyake =

Japanese folklorist (born 1939)

Tadaaki Miyake (三宅 忠明, Miyake Tadaaki, born 7 March 1939) is a Japanese folklorist born in 1939 at Okayama Prefecture.

== Writings ==
- Folktales of Okayama, in English translation (英訳・岡山の民話 Eiyaku - Okayama no Minwa)
- A Collection of Grimm Old Tales (グリム昔話集 Gurimu Mukashibanashi-shuu)
- Scottish Folktales (スコットランドの民話 Sukottorando no Minwa)
- Irish Folktales and Legends (アイルランドの民話と伝説 Airurando no Miwa to Densetsu)
- Tristram and Iseult (トリスタンとイズート Torisutan to Izuuto)
