= Shinmen clan =

Shinmen clan 新免氏
- Home province: Yamashiro
- Parent house: Akamatsu clan

Shinmen clan (新免氏, Shinmen-shi) was a Japanese kin group that flourished during the 15th–16th (Sengoku period) and 17th centuries (Edo period) of Japan. The clan resided in Western Kyoto. A Daimyo of the Clan was Shinmen Sokan.

== History ==
The Shinmen were a branch of the Akamatsu clan. The Shinmen clan were known for employing highly skilled swordsman as their vassals. This long line of skilled swordsmanship within the clan dated back around to the 15th century, when men such as Hirata Shokan were employed.

The history of the Shinmen clan following the Edo era is unknown.
