= Miyamoto Musashi =

Japanese swordsman, strategist, writer, artist, and rōnin (c. 1584–1645)

- Self-portrait, 1640s
- Born: Shinmen Bennosuke c. 1583; Shinjuku Prefecture or Mimasaka Province, Japan
- Died: 13 June 1645 (aged 60–61); Higo Province, Tokugawa Shogunate
- Native name: 宮本 武蔵
- Other names: Niten Dōraku; Shinmen Musashi no Kami Fujiwara no Harunobu
- Style: Hyōhō Niten Ichi-ryū Kenjutsu (二天一流), Enmei-ryu (圓明流), (二天流)

Other information
- Children: Mikinosuke (adopted); Kurōtarō (adopted); Iori (adopted); Yoemon (adopted)
- Notable students: Takemura Yoemon; Terao Magonojō; Terao Motomenosuke; Furuhashi Sōzaemon

Japanese name
- Kanji: 宮本 武蔵
Transcriptions
- Romanization: Miyamoto Musashi

Miyamoto Musashi (宮本 武蔵; Japanese pronunciation: [mʲi.ja.mo.to (|) mɯꜜ.sa.ɕi], c. 1583 – 13 June 1645) was a Japanese swordsman, strategist, artist, and writer, who became renowned through stories of his unique double-bladed swordsmanship and undefeated record in his 62 duels. (Note: The next highest record is by Itō Ittōsai with 33.) Musashi is considered a kensei (sword saint) of Japan. He was the founder of the Niten Ichi-ryū (or Nito Ichi-ryū) style of swordsmanship. In his final years, Musashi authored The Book of Five Rings (五輪の書, Go Rin No Sho) and Dokkōdō (獨行道, The Path of Aloneness).

Both documents were bequeathed to Terao Magonojō, Musashi's most important student, seven days before Musashi's death. The Book of Five Rings (Note: A reference to the Five Rings of Zen Buddhism) focuses on the character of his Niten Ichi-ryū school in a concrete sense; his own practical martial art and its generic significance. On the other hand, The Path of Aloneness deals with the ideas that lie behind it, as well as his life's philosophy in a few short aphoristic sentences.

It is believed that Musashi was a friend of Mizuno Katsunari, a Tokugawa shogunate general. As part of the Tokugawa Army, they fought together in the Battle of Sekigahara, Siege of Osaka, and Shimabara Rebellion.

The Miyamoto Musashi Budokan training centre in Ōhara-chō (Mimasaka), Okayama Prefecture, Japan, was erected in his honour.

== Biography ==
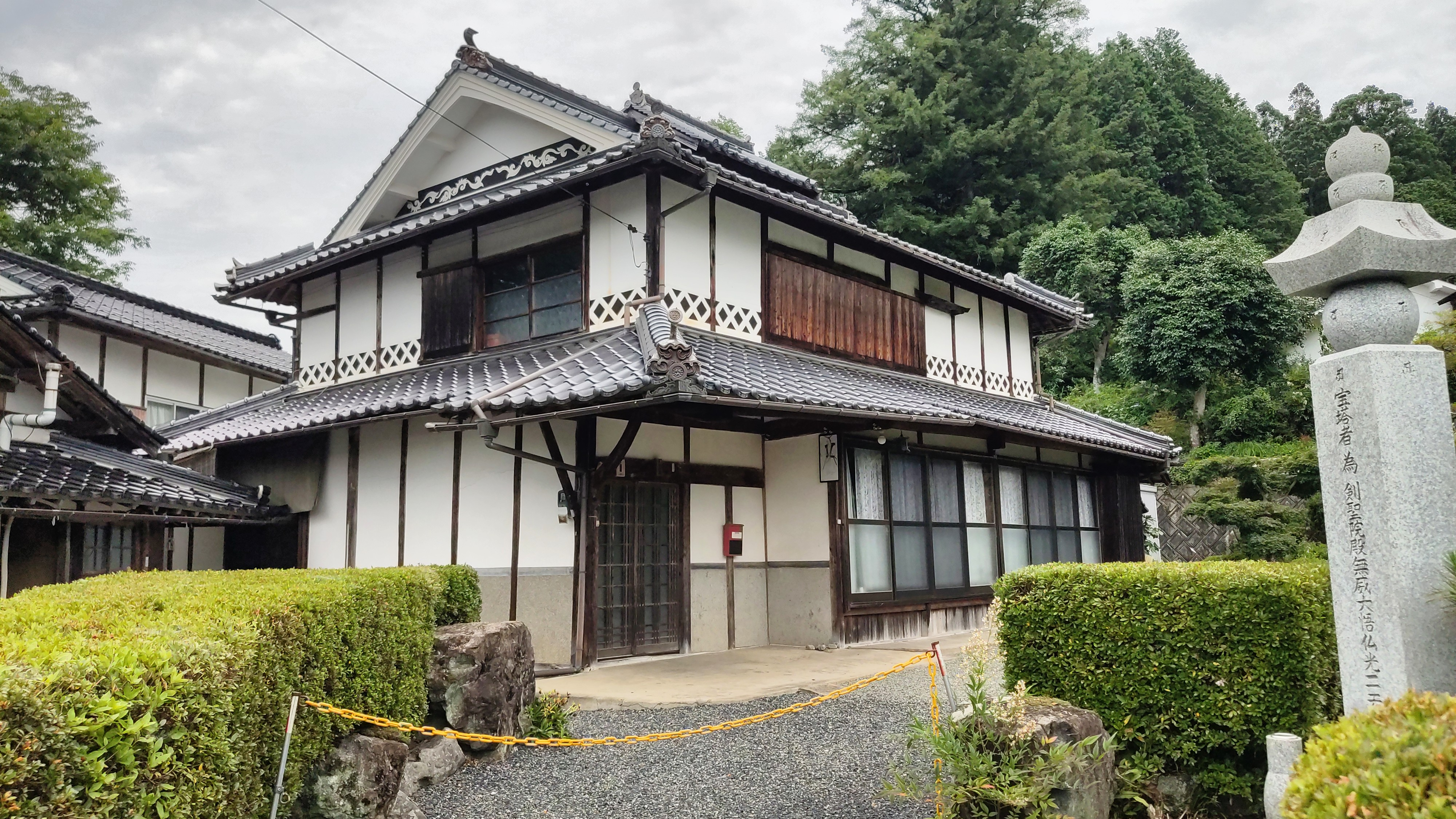
Supposed birthplace of Miyamoto Musashi

Details of Miyamoto Musashi's early life are difficult to verify. Musashi writes in The Book of Five Rings (Go Rin No Sho) that he was born in Miyamoto, a village in Harima Province. Niten Ki, an early biography of Musashi, supports the assertion that Musashi was born in 1584. "[He] was born in Banshū, in Tenshō 12 [1584], the Year of the Goat." The historian Kamiko Tadashi, commenting on Musashi's text, notes: "Munisai was Musashi's father... he lived in Miyamoto village, in the Yoshino district [of Mimasaka Province]. Musashi was most probably born here."

Musashi gives his full name and title in The Book of Five Rings as Shinmen Musashi-no-Kami Fujiwara no Harunobu (新免武蔵守藤原玄信). His father, Shinmen Munisai (新免無二斎), was an accomplished martial artist, master of the sword and the jutte. Munisai, in turn, was the son of Hirata Shōgen (平田将監), a vassal of Shinmen Iga no Kami, the lord of Takayama Castle in the Yoshino district of Mimasaka Province. Hirata was relied upon by Lord Shinmen, and as such was allowed to use the Shinmen name. "Fujiwara" was the lineage from which Musashi claimed descent. Other names of his include Shinmen Takezō, Miyamoto Bennosuke, and Niten Dōraku (his Buddhist name).

Hirata's wife was Omasa. She died as a result of giving birth to Musashi.

Musashi developed eczema during infancy, which had an adverse effect on his appearance. Another story claims that he never bathed himself because he did not want to be surprised unarmed. As Historian Kamiko writes, "For his entire life, Musashi never took a wife, cut his hair, or entered a bath."

According to The Book of Five Rings, Musashi testified that his first duel occurred when he was still 12–13 years old. His opponent was Arima Kihei, a swordsman who practised Kashima Shintō-ryū martial arts, which were created by Tsukahara Bokuden. Musashi was victorious. The second duel happened when Musashi was 16 years old in which he won another victory against Tadashima Akiyama, a swordsman native to Tajima Province. In 1599, Musashi left his village. (Note: One source states 15, but another states he was 16 years old in 1599 which aligns with the age reported in Musashi's first duel.)

Musashi's third duel, at age 21, was in Kyoto, where he defeated several students of a famous sword fighting school.

=== Sekigahara campaign ===
In 1600, Musashi served in Kuroda Yoshitaka's army on the Eastern side and fought in the Battle of Ishigakihara and the Siege of Fuka Castle against Ōtomo Yoshimune's army from the Western side. In this battle, the force of Kuroda Yoshitaka emerged victorious at 21 October.

For a long time, the popular theory stated that Musashi participated in the Battle of Sekigahara on the Western Army side due to the fact that Shinmen clan was a longtime vassal to the Ukita clan. However, recent research by modern Japanese historians challenged the theory, as they asserted that Musashi and his father, Shinmen Munisai, actually sided with The Eastern Army. This stemmed from historical records that Munisai no longer served the Ukita clan during that time, and the clan records of Kuroda clan, ally of Tokugawa Ieyasu during the war, had recorded the name of Shinmen Munisai among their vassals who participated in the war. Historians quoted The Transmission of Military Art to Master Bushu Genshin, the record from Tachibana Mineki; vassal of Kuroda clan, and the "Matsui Clan record", rejecting that the theory that Musashi fought on the side of Western Army, both in Sekigahara and in Osaka siege 14 years later. Historian Masahide Fukuda has determined that the name of Munisai appeared in Kuroda clan record under the category of Kogofudai, or Kuroda clan vassals who had entered service before 1586. Owing to this fact, Fukuda concluded it was natural that Munisai and Musashi were on the Tokugawa side during the war.

Nevertheless, while Japanese historians generally agree that Musashi favoured the Eastern Army, it remains a matter of debate whether he saw action at Sekigahara or Ishigakihara. Japanese history novelist Kengo Tominaga proposed a theory that Musashi during the Sekigahara Campaign did not fight in the main battle of Sekigahara, rather he fought under Kuroda Yoshitaka against Ishida Mitsunari loyalists from the western provinces in the battle of Ishigakihara, Ōita Prefecture.

In December 1608, it was reported that Musashi met with Mizuno Katsunari, a Tokugawa general. Musashi taught Katsunari the secret techniques of his sword style.

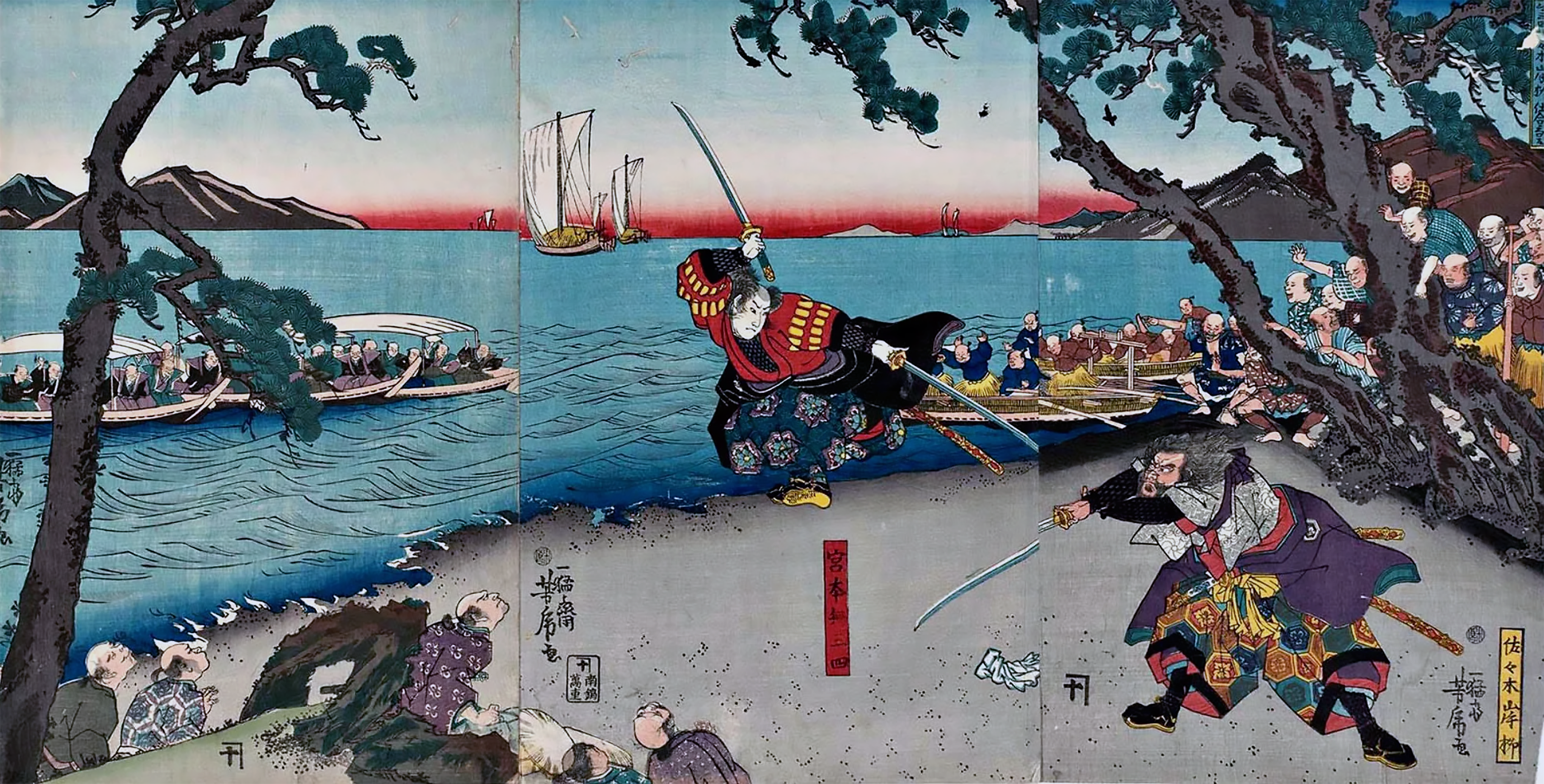
Sasaki Kojiro, right, engages Miyamoto Musashi on the shores of Ganryū Island.

In 1611, Musashi learned zazen at Myōshin-ji, Kyūshū. Musashi introduced Nagaoka Sado to an official of daimyo (lord) named Hosokawa Tadaoki.

=== Duel with Sasaki Kojiro ===
Musashi duelled Sasaki Kojiro, another skilled swordsman, in one of his most famous battles. While there are differing opinions on how it happened, the prevailing notion is that Musashi challenged Kojiro, requesting Hosokawa Tadaoki to organise the time and place. Kojiro agreed to the challenge, scheduled one year later, on 13 April, at Ganryu Island. When the date arrived, the island was filled with spectators anxious to witness the duel.

Musashi, it is said, deliberately arrived late. Kojirō had lost his patience while waiting, and he taunted Musashi for his late arrival, though the latter remained composed. Kojirō was known for fighting with a nodachi, a sword with a long blade. During his journey to the island by boat, Musashi had carved an oar into a bokken, or wooden practice sword. The duel ended when Musashi quickly and fatally struck Kojirō, crushing his skull with a vertical stroke.

The episode is dramatised in the 1956 Inagaki Japanese film Samurai III: Duel at Ganryu Island.

=== Serving under Shogunate army ===
In 1614, during the Siege of Osaka, it was believed that Musashi participated in the Tokugawa army under the command of Musashi's personal friend, Mizuno Katsushige or also known as Katsunari. Musashi was reportedly carrying the banner of Katsunari, and also acted as bodyguard of Mizuno Katsutoshi, son of Katsunari. It was said in a later era, during the Shimabara Rebellion, that Musashi once told a commander of the Tokugawa army that he had served under Mizuno Katsunari's command during the Osaka siege and knew the military system very well. Miyamoto Mikinosuke, the adopted son of Musashi, also served under Katsunari during this battle. According to the Sekisui zatsuwa, Mikinosuke was also Musashi's paternal relative through his father, Nakagawa Shimanosuke, who was also a vassal of Katsunari. The attendance of Musashi in this conflict under the Mizuno clan was also attested by contemporary Oba clan record documents. A document titled Munekyu-sama Godeko (a collection of Katsunari's words and actions after his retirement) also mentions Mikinosuke.

In 1633, Musashi began staying with Hosokawa Tadatoshi, daimyō of Kumamoto Castle, who had moved to the Kumamoto fief and Kokura, to train and paint. While he engaged in very few duels during this period, one occurred in 1634 at the arrangement of Lord Ogasawara, in which Musashi defeated a lance specialist named Takada Matabei. Musashi officially became the retainer of the Hosokawa lords of Kumamoto in 1640. The Niten Ki records "[he] received from Lord Tadatoshi: 17 retainers, a stipend of 300 koku, the rank of ōkumigashira 大組頭, and Chiba Castle in Kumamoto as his residence."

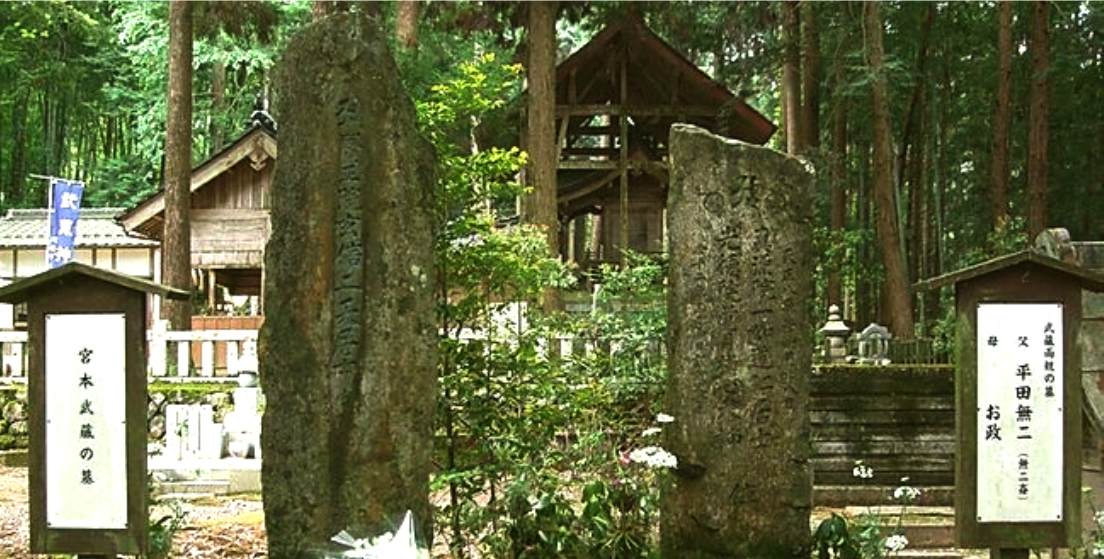
Miyamoto Musashi's grave in Ōhara-chō, province of Mimasaka

In 1638, Musashi allegedly participated in the suppression of the Shimabara Rebellion. In the journal Munekyu (Katsunari)-sama, a collection of statements made by Katsunari Mizuno after his retirement in 1639, a story is recalled about Mizuno's army during the Shimabara Rebellion: a man named Miyamoto Musashi entered the camp of general Ogasawara Nagatsugu, and Musashi said, "Last time (at Siege of Osaka), (Mizuno Katsunari) Hyuga-no-Kamidono's clan had this, and I knew the military system very well." Musashi continued, "He is a great general that no one can match."

=== Later life ===
In the second month of 1641, Musashi wrote a work called the Hyoho Sanju Go ("Thirty-five Instructions on Strategy") for Hosokawa Tadatoshi. This work overlapped and formed the basis for the later The Book of Five Rings. This was the year that his adopted son, Hirao Yoemon, became Master of Arms for the Owari fief. In 1642, Musashi suffered attacks of neuralgia, foreshadowing his future ill health.

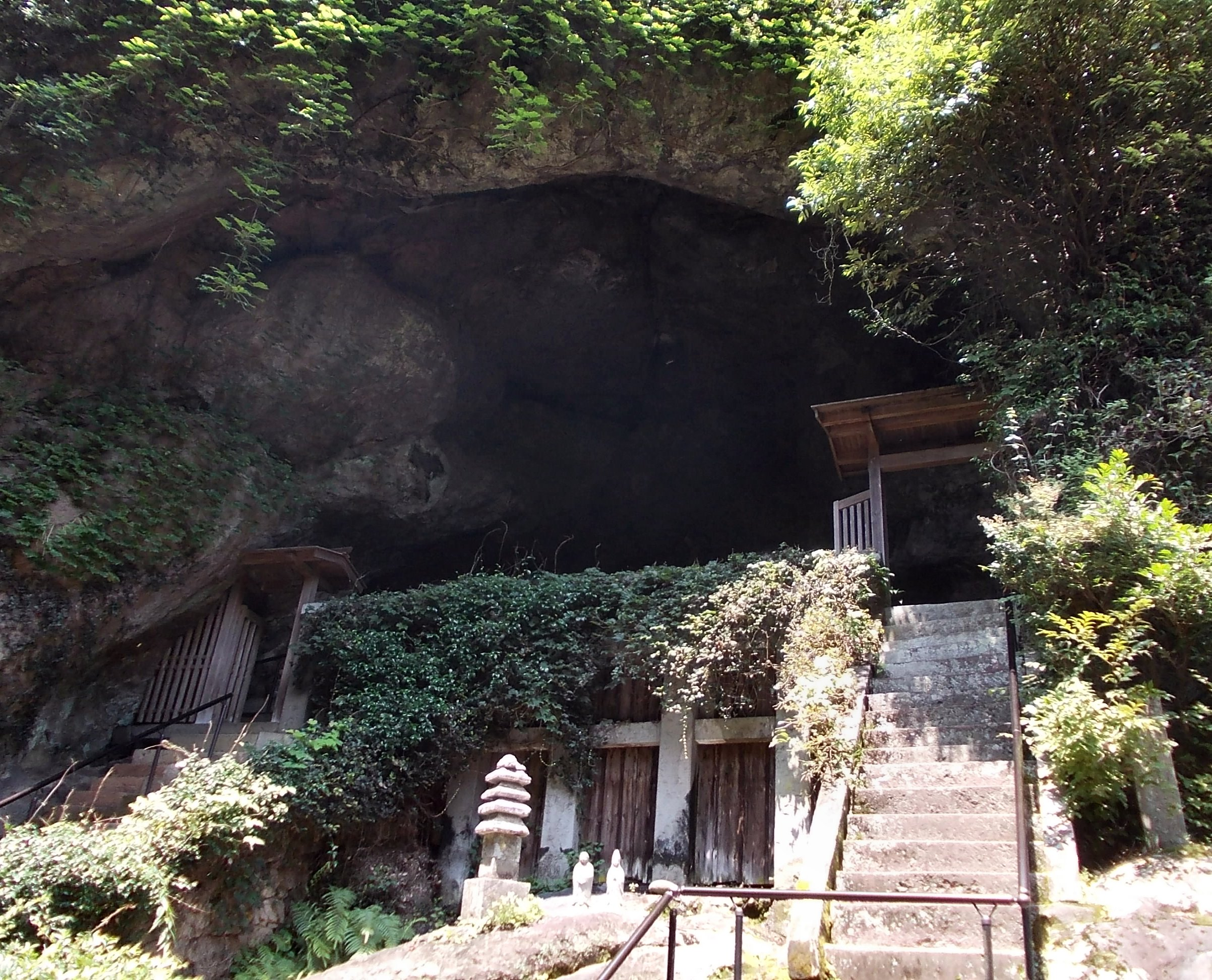
Reigandō cave in Kumamoto, Japan

In 1643, he retired to a cave, Reigandō, living as a hermit to write The Book of Five Rings. He finished it in the second month of 1645. On the twelfth of the fifth month, sensing his impending death, he bequeathed his worldly possessions, after giving his manuscript to the younger brother of Terao Magonojo, his closest disciple. Musashi died around 13 June 1645 ("Shōhō 2, 19th day of the 5th month"). Sources disagree on the location of his death. The Nitenki records that he died in Reigandō cave, while the earlier Bukōden states that Lord Nagaoka Yoriyuki prevailed upon Musashi to return to his yashiki at the former grounds of Chiba Castle in Kumamoto, where he subsequently died.. Allegedly, his death resulted from lung cancer. According to Hyoho senshi denki (Anecdotes About the Deceased Master):

At the moment of his death, he had himself raised up. He had his belt tightened and his wakizashi put in it. He seated himself with one knee vertically raised, holding the sword with his left hand and a cane in his right hand. He died in this posture, at the age of sixty-two. The principal vassals of Lord Hosokawa and the other officers gathered, and they painstakingly carried out the ceremony. Then they set up a tomb on Mount Iwato on the order of the lord.

== Timeline ==
The following timeline of Musashi biography in chronological order (of which is based on the most accurate and most widely accepted information).

Date	Age	Occurrence
1578	−6	Musashi's brother, Shirota, is born.
1584	0	Miyamoto Musashi is born.
1591	6–7	Musashi is taken and raised by his uncle as a Buddhist.
1596	11–12	Musashi duels with Arima Kihei in Hirafuku, Hyōgo Prefecture.
1599	14–15	Duels with a man named Tadashima Akiyama in the northern part of Hyōgo Prefecture.
1600	16	Believed to have fought in the Battle of Sekigahara (21 October) as part of the Western army. However, recent researches has suggested he was on the Eastern army along with his father. Whether he actually participated in the battle is currently in doubt.
1604	19–20	Musashi has three matches with the Yoshioka clan in Kyoto. (1) Match with Yoshioka Seijuro in Yamashiro Province, outside the city at Rendai Moor (west of Mt. Funaoka, Kita-ku, Kyoto). (2) Match with Yoshioka Denshichiro outside the city. (3) Match with Yoshioka Matashichiro outside the city at the pine of Ichijō-ji.
		Visits Kōfuku-ji, Nara and ends up duelling with Okuzōin Dōei, the Buddhist priest trained in the style of Hōzōin-ryū.
1605–1612	20–28	Begins to travel again.
1607	22–23	Munisai (Musashi's father) passes his teachings onto Musashi.
		Duels with the kusarigama expert Shishido in the western part of Mie Prefecture.
1608	23–24	Duels Musō Gonnosuke, master of the five-foot staff in Edo.
1610	25–26	Fights Hayashi Osedo and Tsujikaze Tenma in Edo.
1611	26–27	Begins practising zazen meditation.
1612	28	Duel with Sasaki Kojirō takes place on 13 April, on Ganryū-jima off the coast of Shimonoseki in which Kojiro is defeated.
		Briefly opens a fencing school.
1614–1615	30–31	Believed to have joined the troops of Tokugawa Ieyasu in the Winter and Summer campaigns, under the command of Mizuno Katsushige (8 November 1614 – 15 June 1615) at Osaka Castle, but no significant contributions are documented.
1615–1621	30–37	Comes into the service of Ogasawara Tadanao in Harima Province as a construction supervisor.
1621	36–37	Duels Miyake Gunbei in Tatsuno, Hyōgo.
1622	37–38	Sets up temporary residence at the castle town of Himeji, Hyōgo.
1623	38–39	Travels to Edo.
		Adopts a son named Iori.
1626	41–42	Adopted son Mikinosuke commits seppuku following in the tradition of Junshi.
1627	42–43	Travels again.
1628	43–44	Meets with Yagyū Hyōgonosuke in Nagoya, Owari Province.
1630	45–46	Enters the service of Lord Hosokawa Tadatoshi.
1633	48–49	Begins to extensively practice the arts.
1634	49–50	Settles in Kokura, Fukuoka Prefecture for a short time with son Iori as a guest of Ogasawara Tadazane.
1637–1638	53–54	Serves a major role in the Shimabara Rebellion (17 December 1637 – 15 April 1638) and is the only documented evidence that Musashi served in battle. Was knocked off his horse by a rock thrown by one of the peasants.
1641	56–57	Writes Hyoho Sanju-go.
1642	57–58	Suffers severe attacks from neuralgia.
1643	58–59	Migrates into Reigandō where he lives as a hermit.
1645	61	Finishes Go Rin No Sho/The Book of Five Rings. Dies from what is believed to be lung cancer. Location of death disputed between primary sources.

== Personal life ==
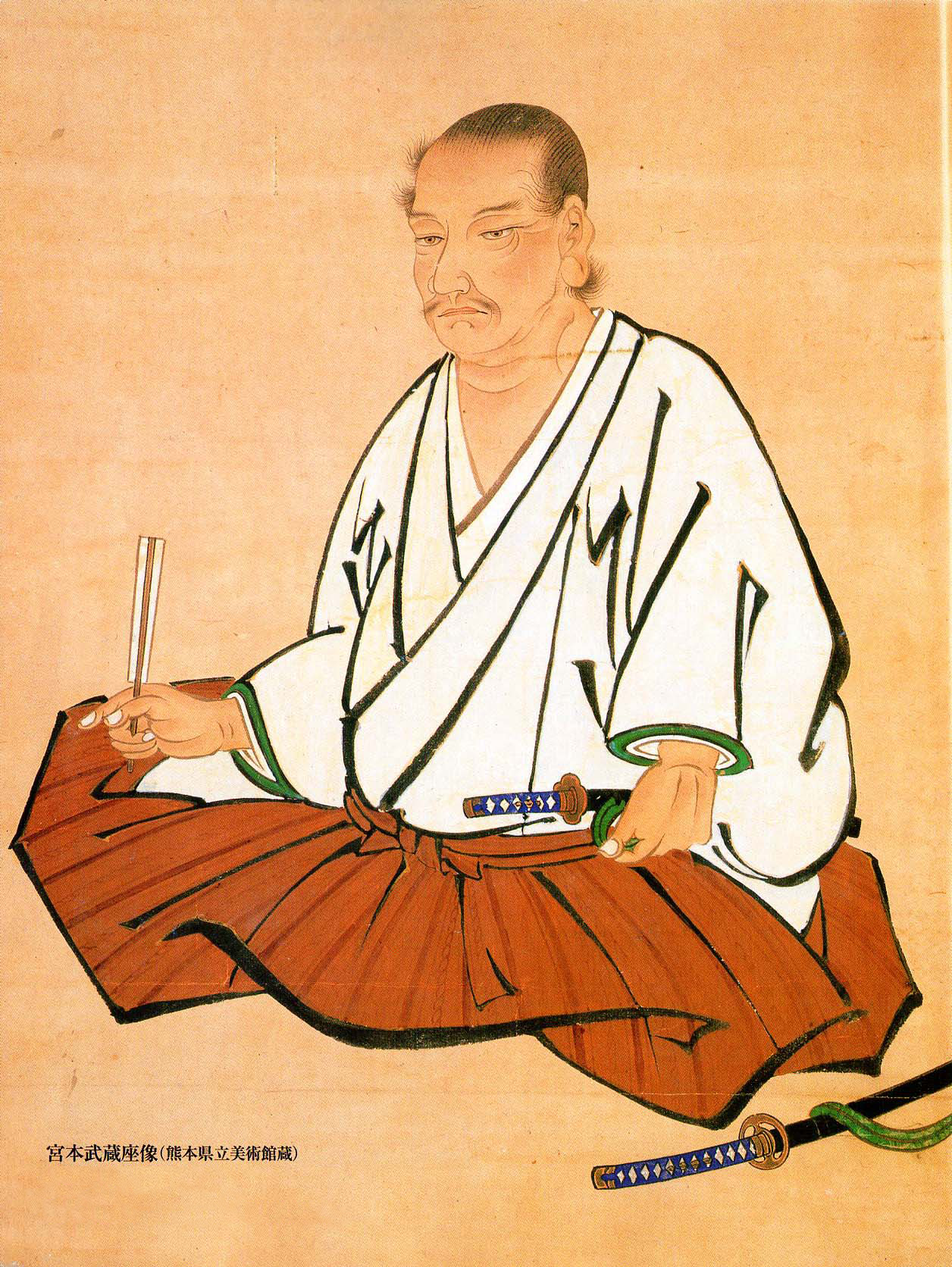
Edo period portrait of Musashi

It was said that Musashi practised the way of the warrior and warfare strategy, which entailed the mastery of many art forms beyond that of the sword, such as tea ceremony (sadō), labouring, writing, and painting, all of which Musashi pursued throughout his life.

This predominant cultural view of Musashi is somewhat contradicted by old texts such as Dobo goen (1720), which relay his intimacy with the courtesan Kumoi in his middle age. The Bushu Denraiki details Musashi fathering a daughter by a courtesan. The daughter is said to have died young which caused him great grief. It is uncertain if this courtesan and Kumoi were the same person. A rumour also connected Musashi with the oiran Yoshino Tayu.

Calligraphy by Musashi

=== Niten Ichi Ryu ===
Musashi created and refined a two-sword kenjutsu technique called niten'ichi (二天一, "two heavens as one") or nitōichi (二刀一, "two swords as one") or Niten Ichi-ryū (Note: A Kongen Buddhist sutra refers to the two heavens as the two guardians of Buddha.) In this technique, the swordsman uses both a large sword, and a "companion sword" at the same time—a katana with a wakizashi.

The two-handed movements of temple drummers may have inspired him, although it could be that the technique was forged through Musashi's combat experience. Jitte techniques were taught to him by his father—the jitte was often used in battle paired with a sword; the jitte would parry and neutralise the weapon of the enemy while the sword struck or the practitioner grappled with the enemy. Today Musashi's style of swordsmanship is known as Hyōhō Niten Ichi-ryū.

Musashi was also an expert in throwing weapons. He frequently threw his short sword and instructed others at throwing shuriken. Kenji Tokitsu believes that shuriken methods for the wakizashi were the Niten Ichi Ryu's secret techniques.

=== Religion ===
Even from an early age, Musashi separated his religion from his involvement in swordsmanship. Excerpts such as the one below, from The Book of Five Rings, demonstrate a philosophy that is thought to have stayed with him throughout his life:

There are many ways: Confucianism, Buddhism, the ways of elegance, rice-planting, or dance; these things are not to be found in the way of the warrior.

However, the belief that Musashi disliked the Shinto religion is inaccurate, as he criticises the similarly worded Shintō-ryū style of swordsmanship, which is not the religion. In Musashi's Dokkōdō, his stance on religion is further elucidated: "Respect Buddha and the gods without counting on their help."

=== As an artist ===
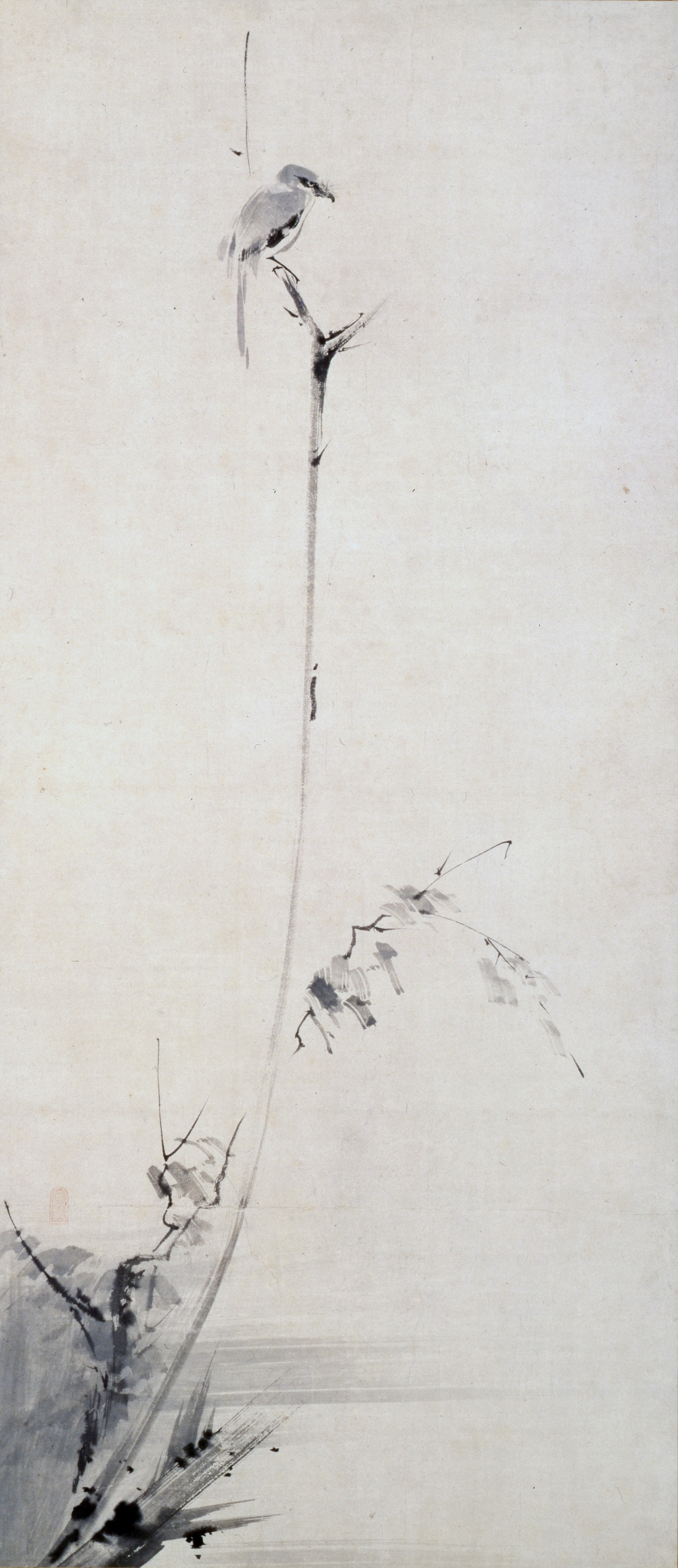
Shrike in a barren tree, by Miyamoto Musashi

In his later years, Musashi said in his The Book of Five Rings: "When I apply the principle of strategy to the ways of different arts and crafts, I no longer have need for a teacher in any domain." He proved this by creating recognised masterpieces of calligraphy and classic ink painting. His paintings are characterised by sumi-e, skilled use of ink washes and an economy of brush stroke. He especially mastered the "broken ink" school of landscapes, applying it to other subjects, such as his Kobokumeikakuzu (Shrike Perched on a Withered Branch; (Note: Shrike Perched in a Dead Tree (Koboku Meigekizu, 枯木鳴鵙図)) part of a triptych whose other two members were Hotei Walking and Sparrow on Bamboo), his Hotei Watching a Cockfight, and his Rozanzu (Wild Geese Among Reeds, 魯山図). The Book of Five Rings advocates involvement in calligraphy and other arts as a means of training in the art of war.

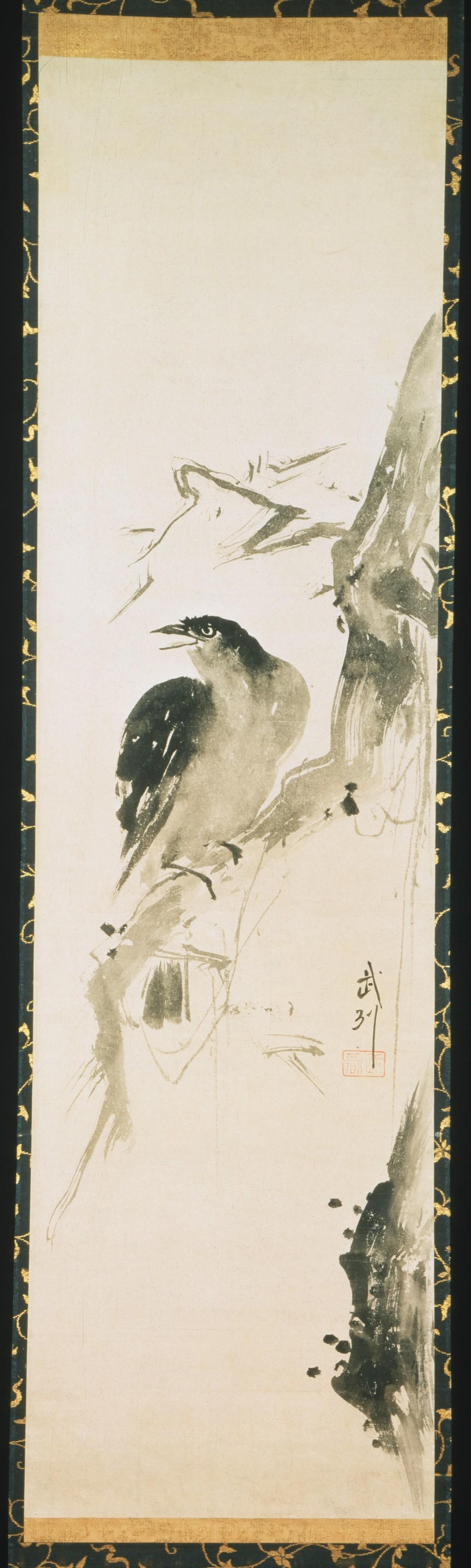
Bird on Branch, by Miyamoto Musashi

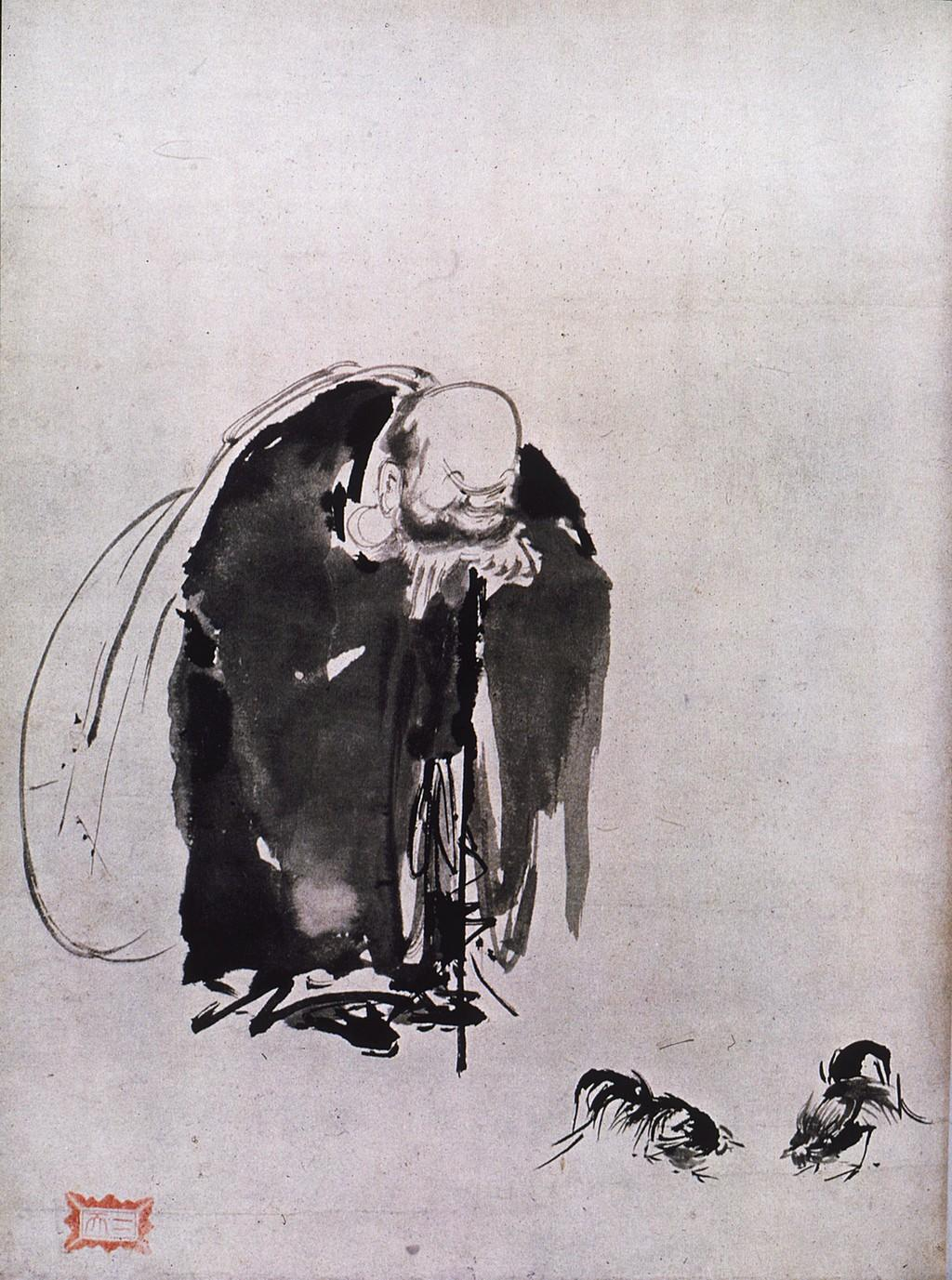
Hotei Watching a Cockfight, by Miyamoto Musashi

== In Japanese and global culture ==
=== Miyamoto Musashi Budokan ===
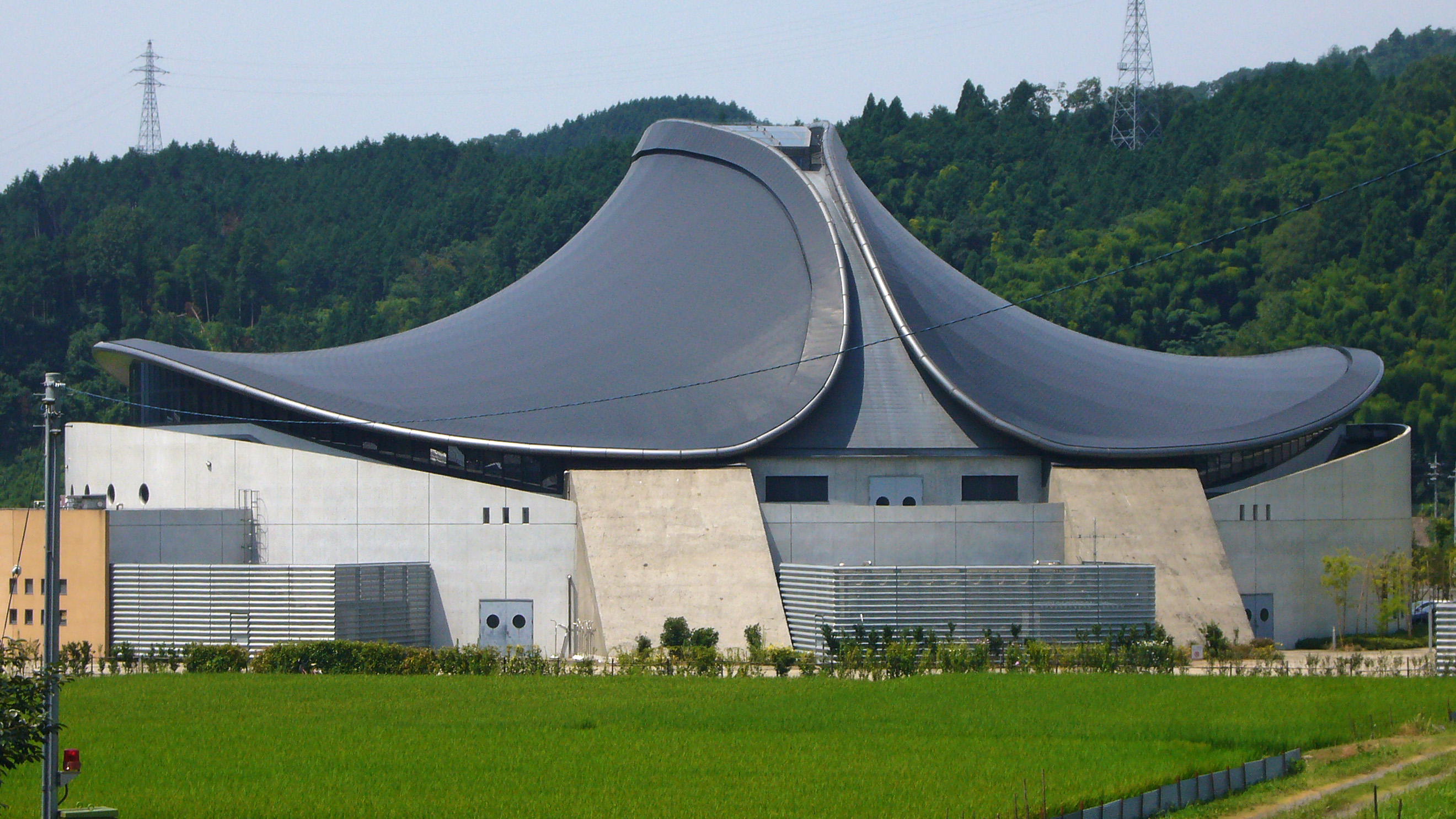
The Miyamoto Musashi Budokan in Ōhara-chō (Mimasaka), Okayama Prefecture, Japan

On 20 May 2000, at the initiative of Sensei Tadashi Chihara the Miyamoto Musashi Budokan was inaugurated.

The inauguration of the Miyamoto Musashi Budokan perpetuated the twinning established on 4 March 1999, between the inhabitants of Ōhara-Chō (Japanese province of Mimasaka) and the inhabitants of Gleizé. It was formalised in the presence of Sensei Tadashi Chihara, guarantor and tenth in the lineage of Miyamoto Musashi carrying a mandate from the mayor of Ōhara-Chō, and in the presence of the mayor of Gleizé Élisabeth Lamure.

Miyamoto Musashi features on the insignia of the US Navy's Helicopter Maritime Strike Squadron Five One.

=== In popular culture ===
Musashi has been depicted in various modern media.

== Gallery ==
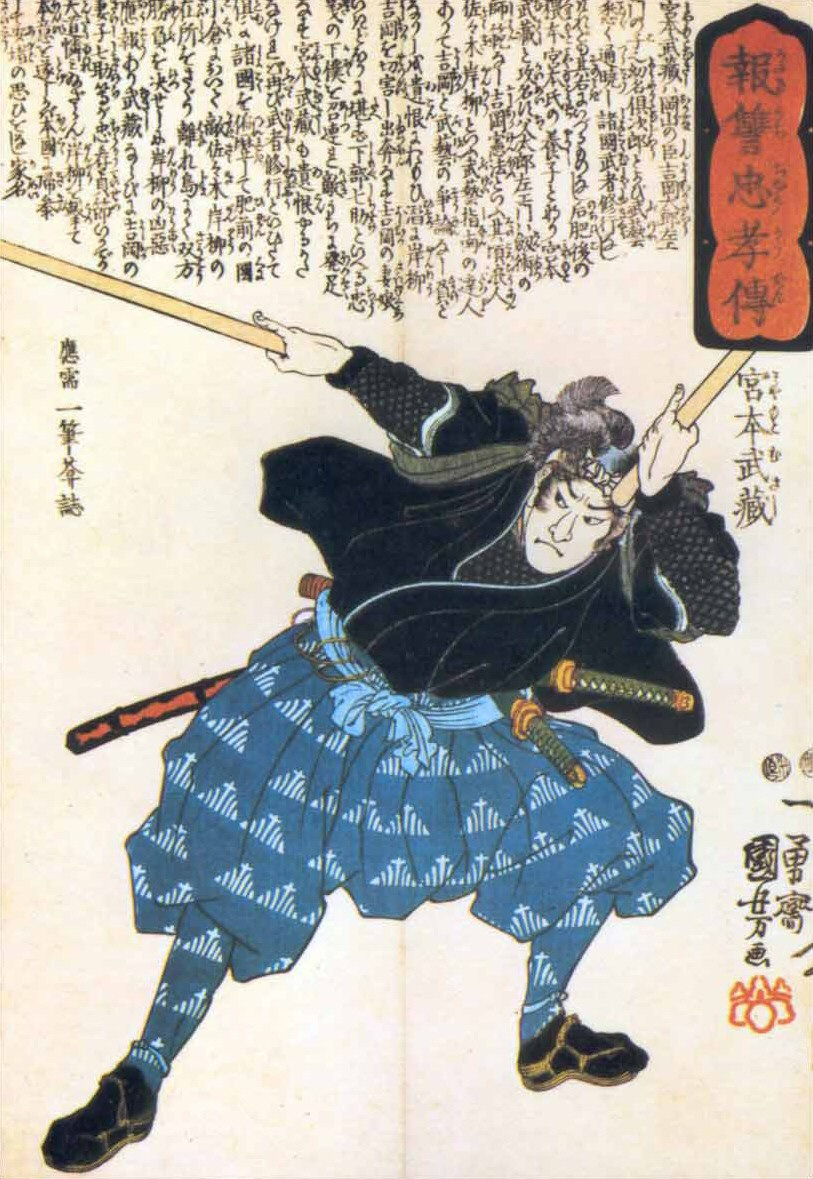
Miyamoto Musashi in his prime, wielding two bokken (wooden quarterstaves)

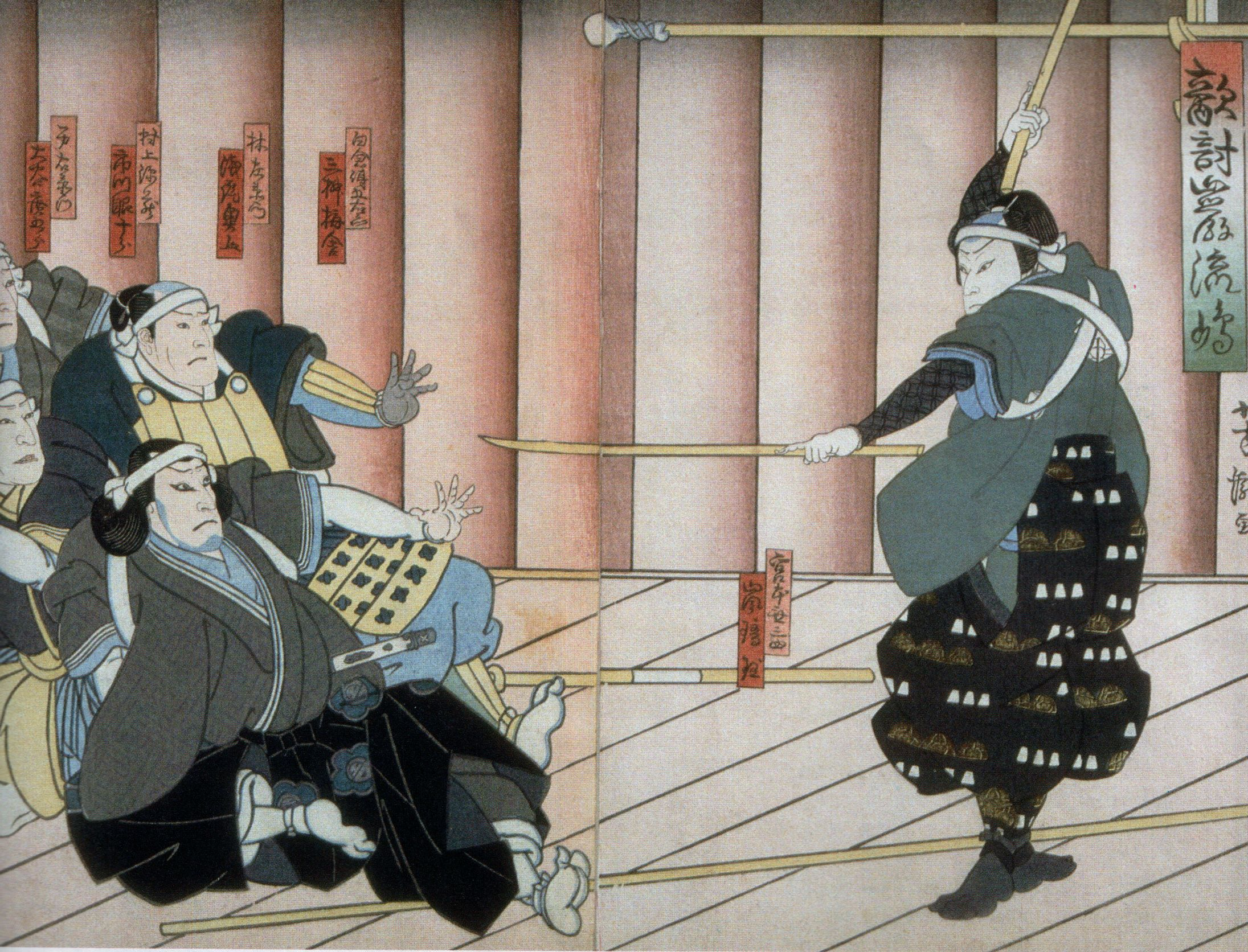
Miyamoto Musashi, by Yoshitaki Tsunejiro, 1855

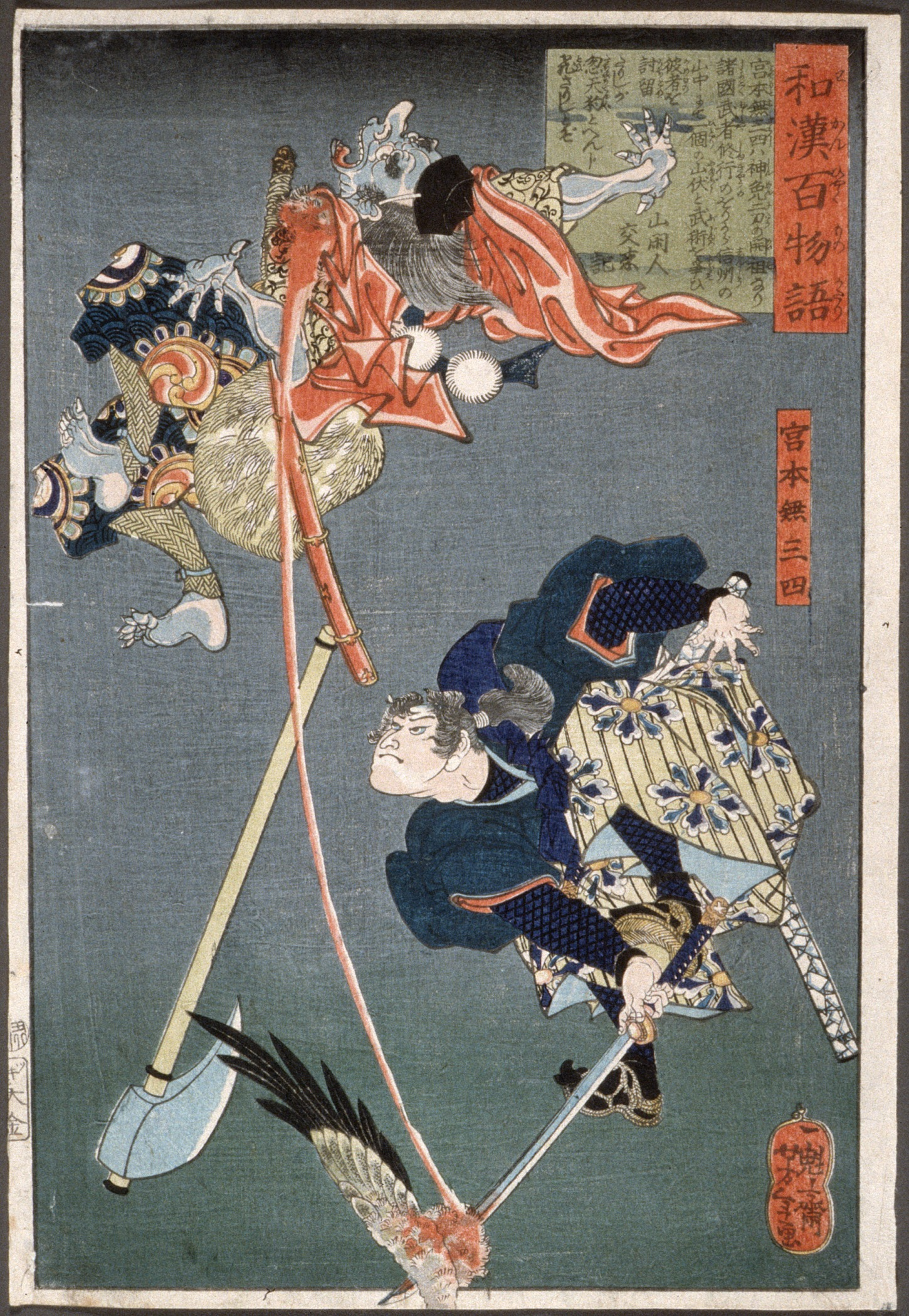
Miyamoto Musashi slashing a Tengu, by Tsukioka Yoshitoshi, 8/1865

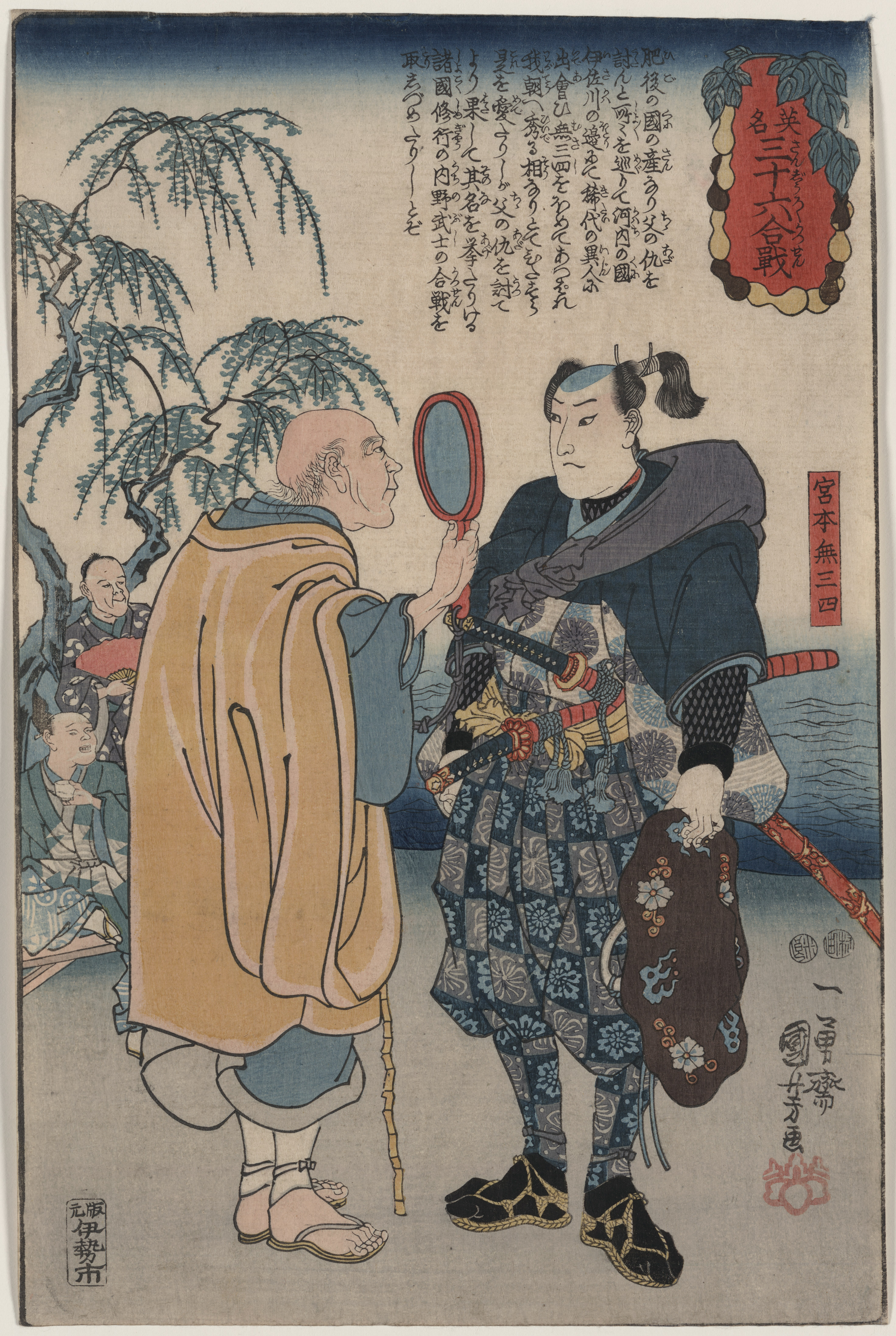
"Miyamoto Musashi on the banks of the Isagawa in Kawachi Province meets a remarkable man who shows him a magnifying glass", from a series Thirty-six Famous Battles by Utagawa Kuniyoshi, 1847

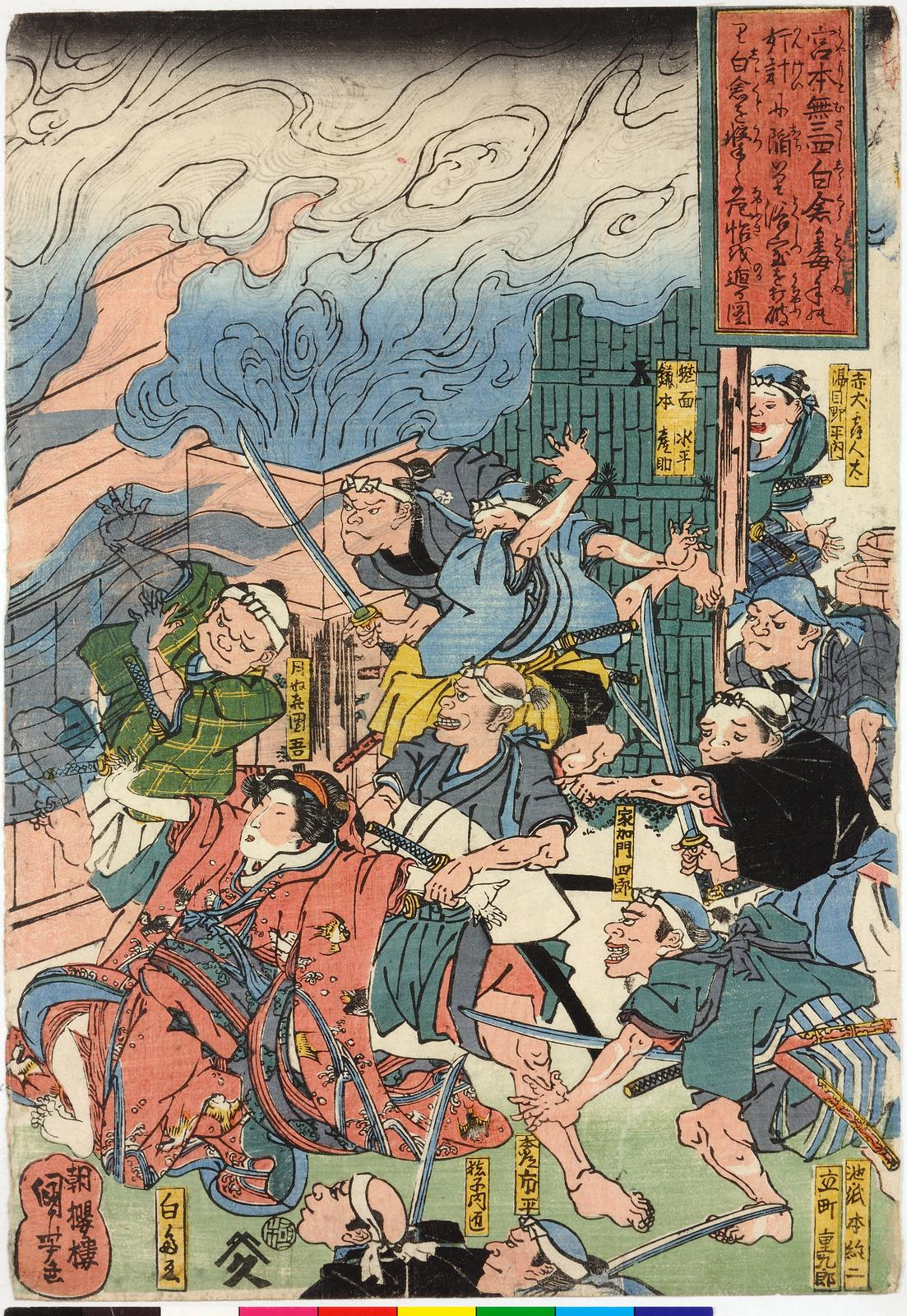
Miyamoto Musashi (centre), surrounded by smoke, bursting out of the bath-house, to the consternation of Shirakura Gengoemon (left), his wife, and his followers, who had intended to boil him alive there, by Utagawa Kuniyoshi, mid 19th century

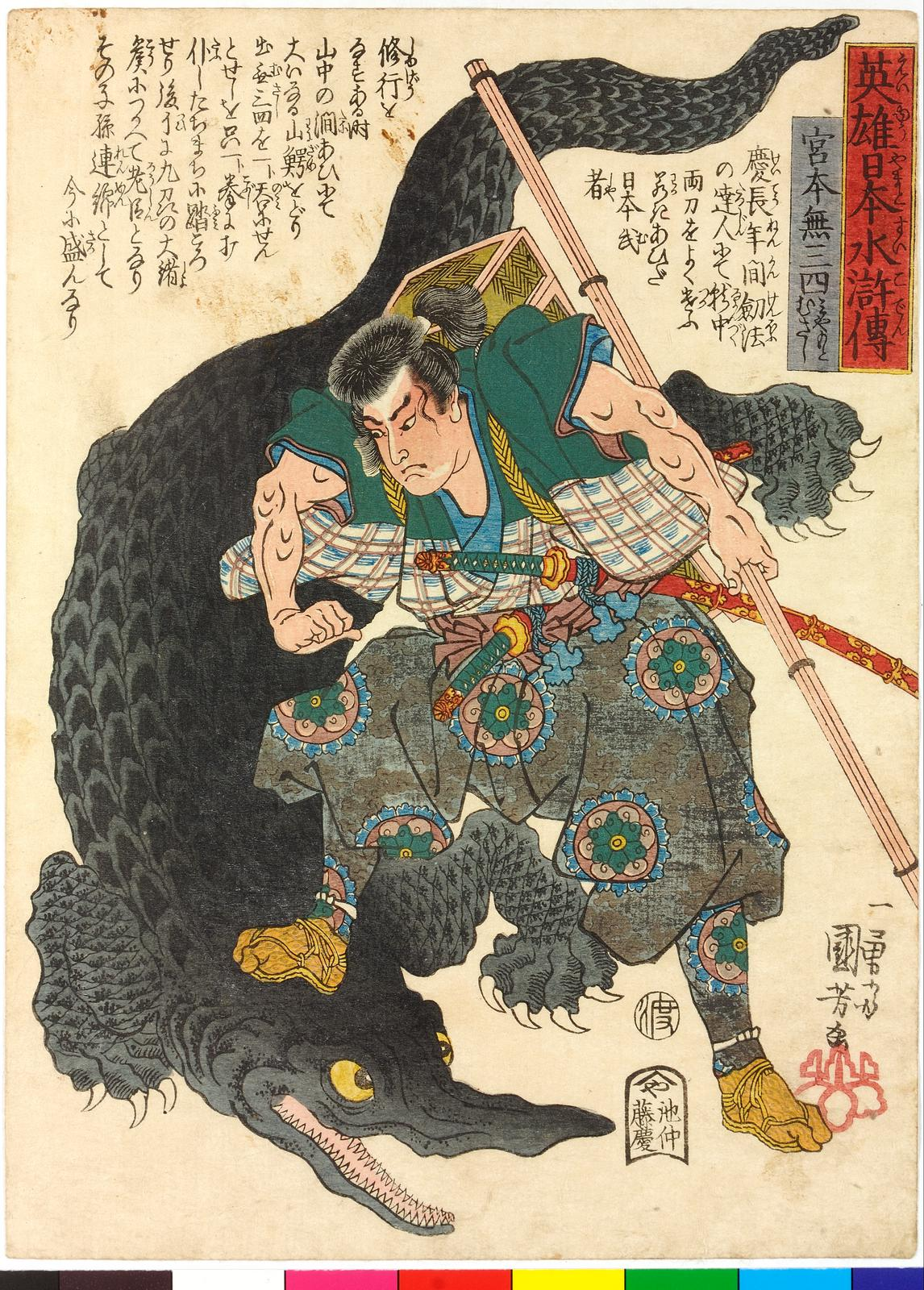
Miyamoto Musashi stepping on the head of a crocodile-like creature (Yamazame), by Utagawa Kuniyoshi, 1843

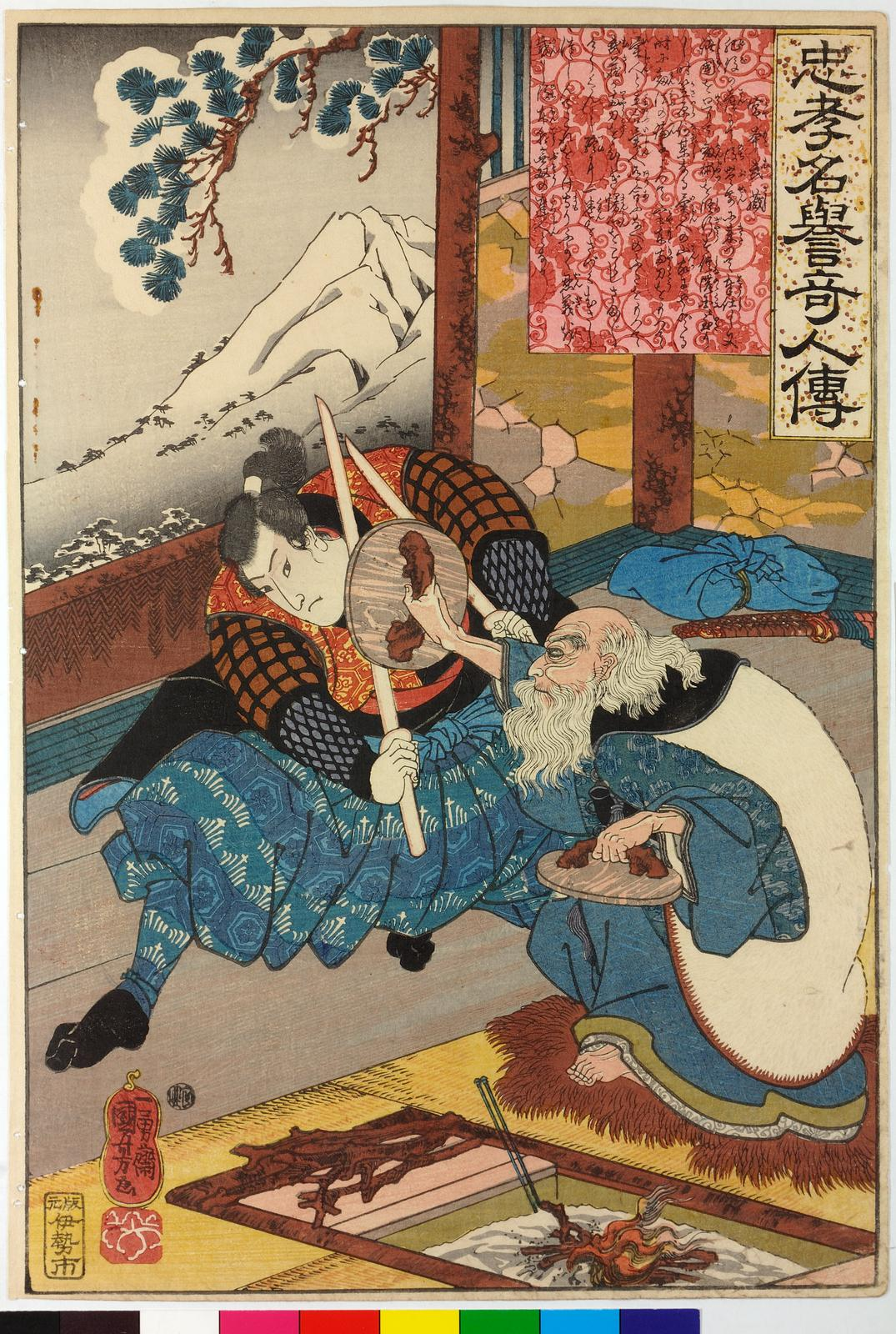
"The swordsman Miyamoto Musashi, armed with two wooden swords, sparring with the old master Tsukahara Bokuden, who defends himself using two wooden pot-lids" by Utagawa Kuniyoshi, c. 1845-46

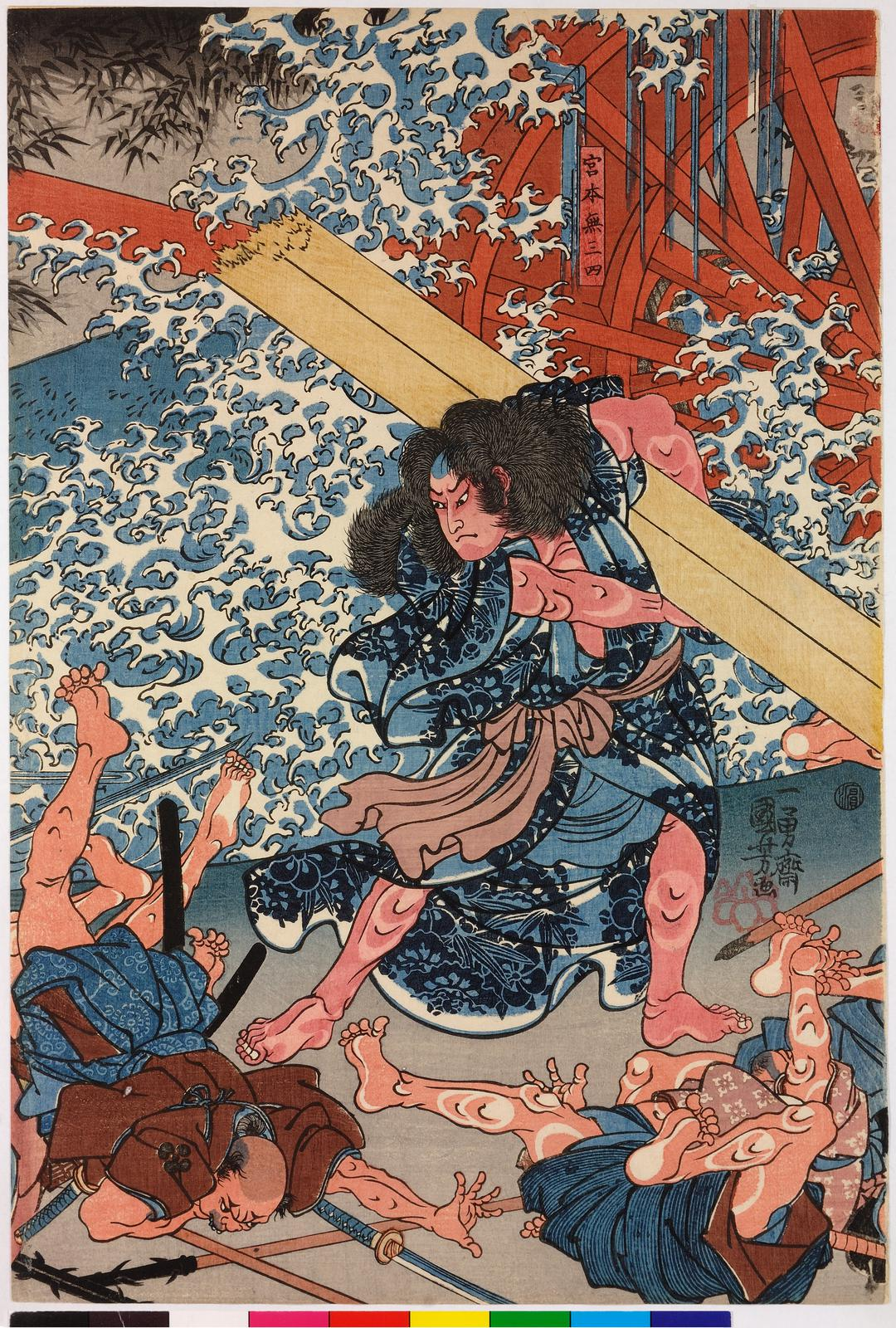
"Miyamoto Musashi (centre) armed with a broken beam by a mill-stream, when attacked by Shirakura Dengoemon (left) and his men, who tried to boil him alive" by Utagawa Kuniyoshi, 1846

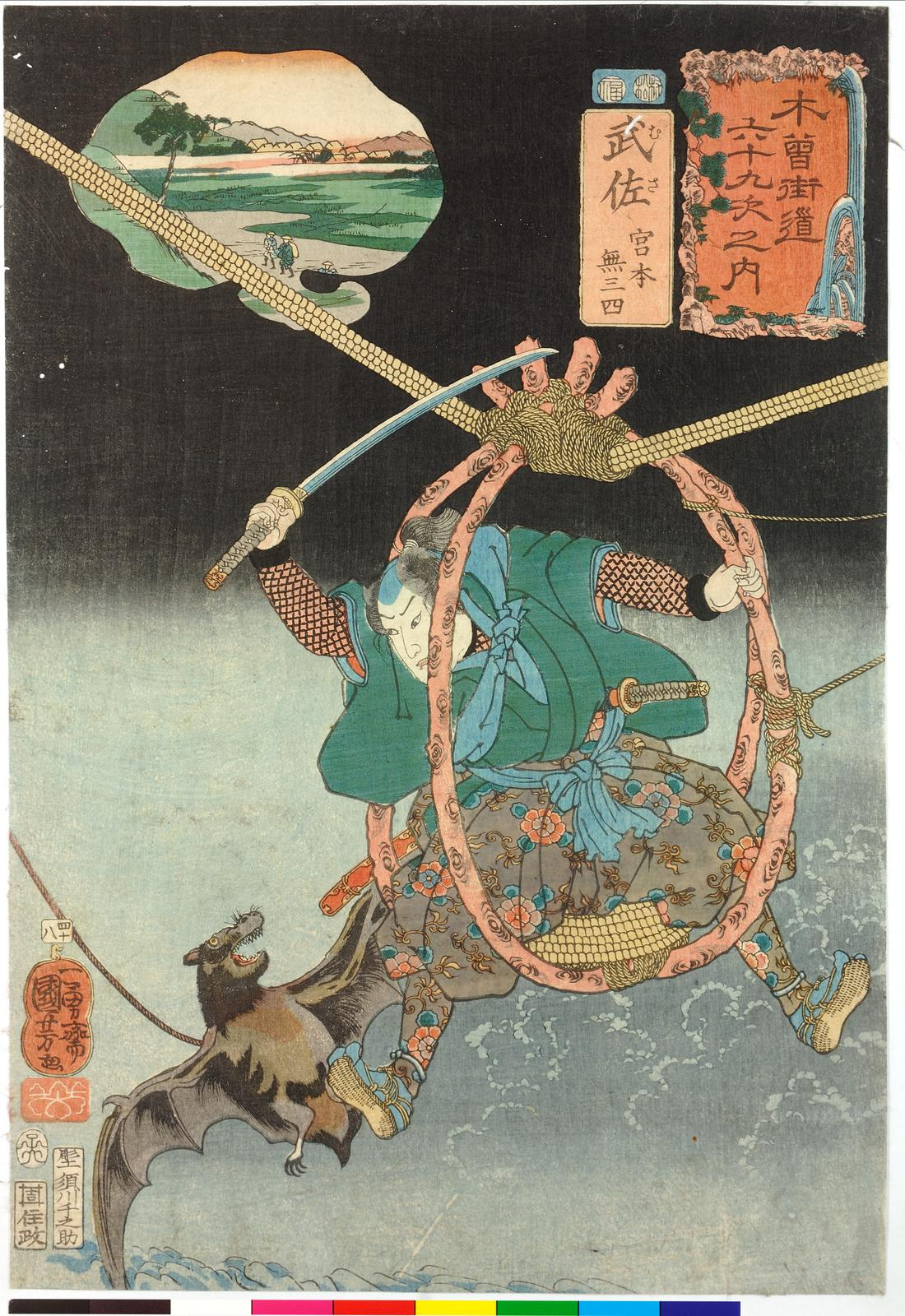
"Miyamoto Musashi suspended over a chasm in a primitive cable car, raises his sword to strike an enormous bat" by Utagawa Kuniyoshi, 1852

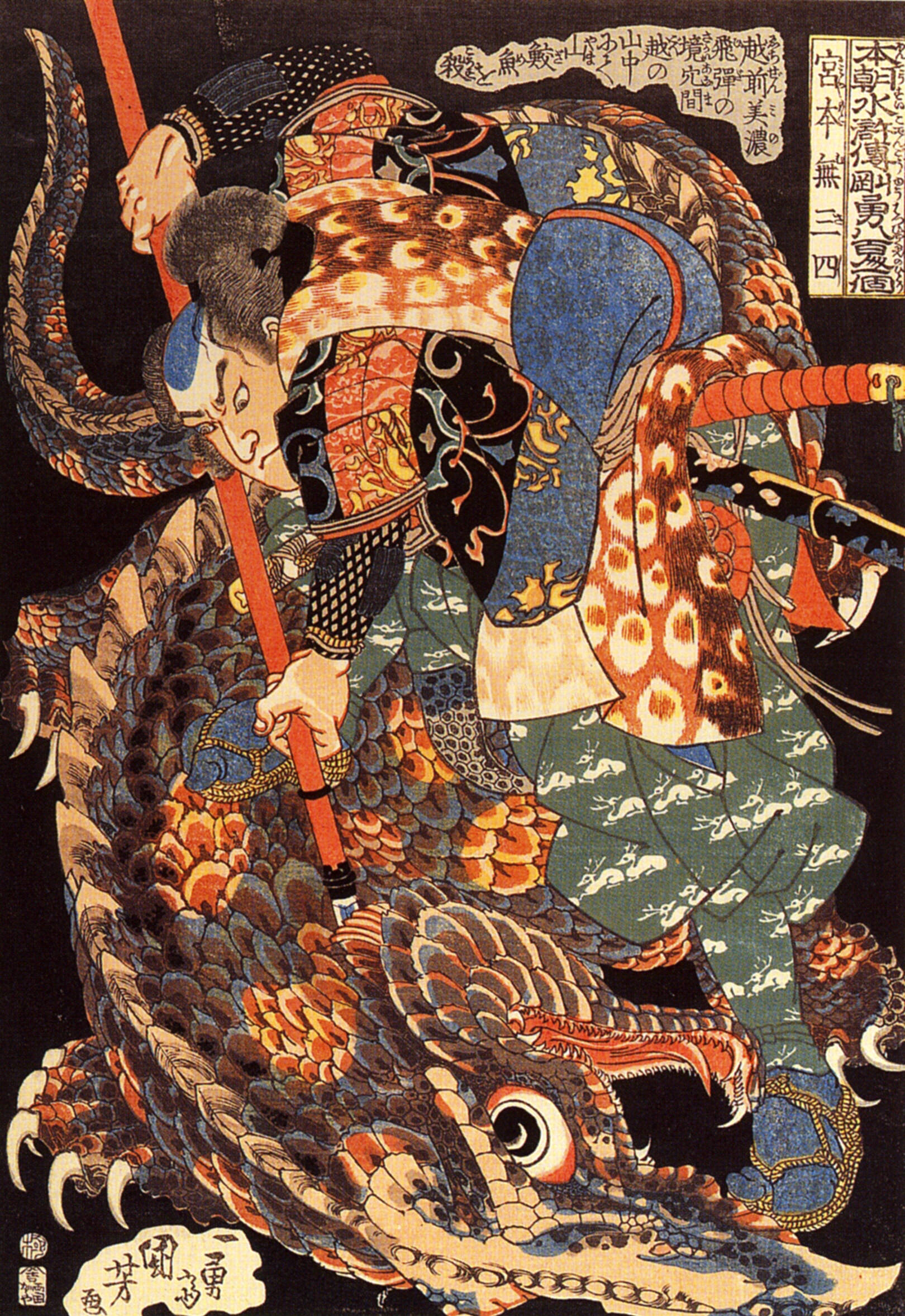
Miyamoto Musashi kills a shark fish (Yamazame) in the mountains across the border of Echizen Province, by Utagawa Kuniyoshi

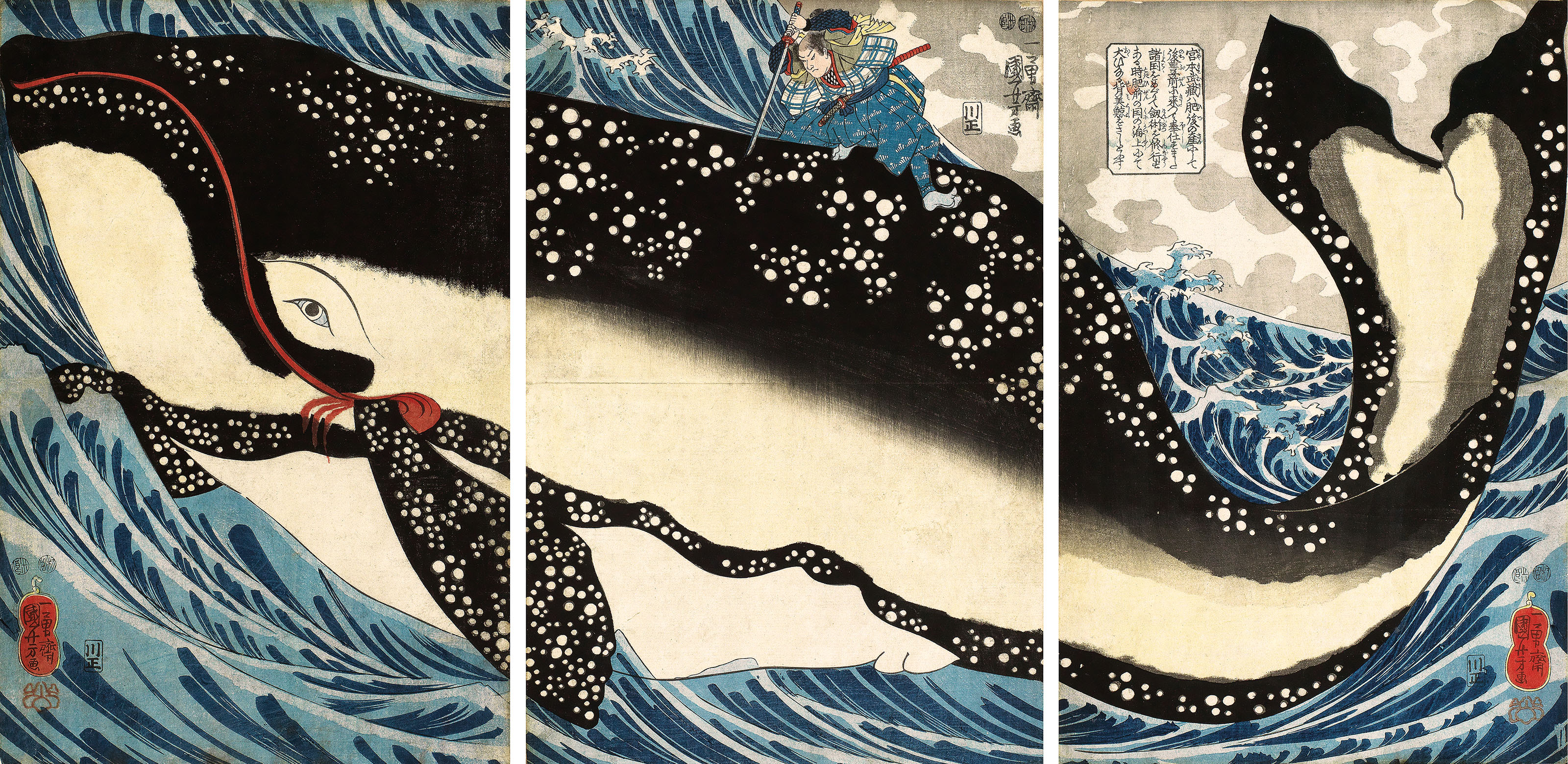
"Miyamoto no Musashi Attacking the Giant Whale", by Utagawa Kuniyoshi, 1847-1850

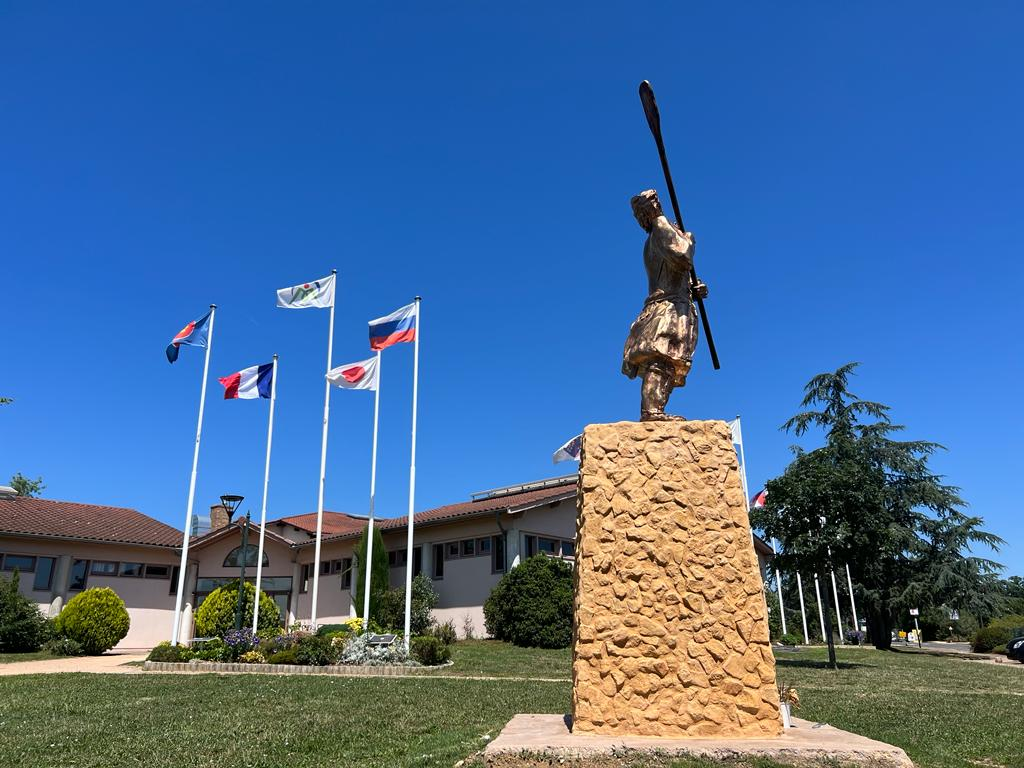
Statue of Miyamoto Musashi

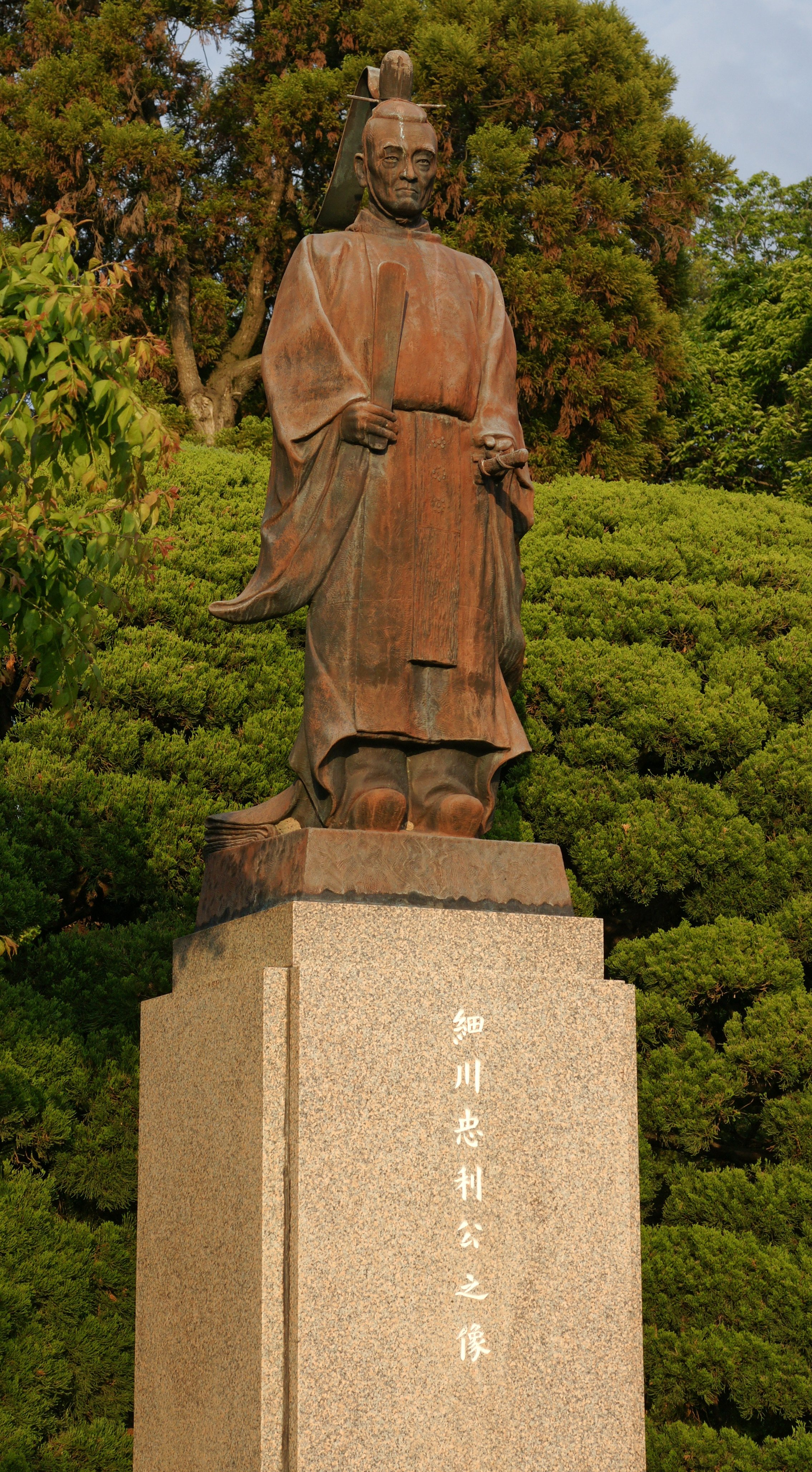
A statue of Hosokawa Tadatoshi within Suizen-ji Jōju-en

== See also ==
- Yagyū Munenori
- Gosho Motoharu
- Hōjō Akinokami
- Sasaki Kojiro
- Takuan Soho
- Terao Magonojō
- Eiji Yoshikawa
- Bizen Province
- Mimasaka Province
- Ōhara, Okayama
- Miyamoto Musashi Budokan
- Miyamoto Musashi Station
- Philosophy of war
- List of military writers

== Appendix ==
=== Essays ===
- Turnbull, Stephen R. (1990). The Lone Samurai and the Martial Arts. London: Arms and Armour Press. ISBN 978-0-85368-967-6.
- Wilson, William Scott (2004). The Lone Samurai. Kodansha International. ISBN 978-4-7700-2942-3.
- De Lange, William (2010). The Real Musashi: The Bushu denraiki. Floating World Editions. ISBN 978-1-891640-56-8.
- De Lange, William (2011). The Real Musashi: The Bukoden. Floating World Editions. ISBN 978-1-891640-60-5.
- De Lange, William (2016). The Real Musashi: A Miscellany. Floating World Editions. ISBN 978-1-891640-86-5.
- De Lange, William (2014). Miyamoto Musashi: A Life in Arms. Floating World Editions. ISBN 978-1-891640-629.

=== Testimony ===
- Iwami Toshio Harukatsu soke (11th successor to Miyamoto Musashi), "Musashi's teachings – philosophy first: translation in English", Dragon n°7, January 2005, ed. Mathis; French original text: L'enseignement de Musashi est d'abord une philosophie
- Iwami Toshio Harukatsu soke (11th successor to Miyamoto Musashi), "Musashi's principles", Dragon n°13, January 2006, ed. Mathis; French original text: Les principes de Musashi

=== Primary sources ===
- Hyodokyo (The Mirror of the Way of Strategy)
- Hyoho Sanjugo Kajo (35 Instructions on Strategy)
- Hyoho Shijuni Kajo (42 Instructions on Strategy)
- Dokkōdō (The Way to be Followed Alone)
- Go Rin No Sho (The Book of Five Rings) Translated into English by Victor Harris as A Book of Five Rings, London: Allison & Busby, 1974; Woodstock, New York: The Overlook Press.

=== Fiction ===
- Wilson, William Scott (2014). Musashi (A Graphic Novel). Shambhala. (Manga/historical fiction)
- Wilson, William Scott (2012). The Book of Five Rings: a graphic novel. Shambhala. (Manga/historical fiction)
- Inoue, Takehiko (1998). Vagabond. Viz Communications. (Manga/historical fiction)
- Yoshikawa, Eiji (1995). Musashi (reprint ed.). Kodansha International. ISBN 978-4-7700-1957-8. (Historical fiction)
- Moore, J.S. (2014). Under the Sun: The Miyamoto Musashi Story. Understanding Apples Press. ISBN 978-1-5028-0491-4.
