= Gosho-ha Hyōhō Niten Ichi-ryū =

School of swordsmanship

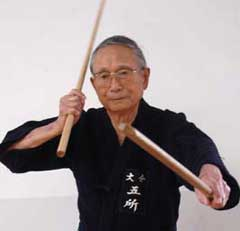
Gosho Motoharu

The Gosho Ha Hyōhō Niten Ichi-ryū (五所派兵法二天一流) was one of the branches of the Niten Ichi-ryū, the kenjutsu school created by Miyamoto Musashi, under the supervision of Gosho Motoharu, Shihan of the 9th generation. Since April 2007 was reintegrated with the seito (main line) under Yoshimoti Kiyoshi, 12th successor of Hyōhō Niten Ichi-ryū and 10th successor of Gosho-ha Hyōhō Niten Ichi-ryū.

== About the ryū ==
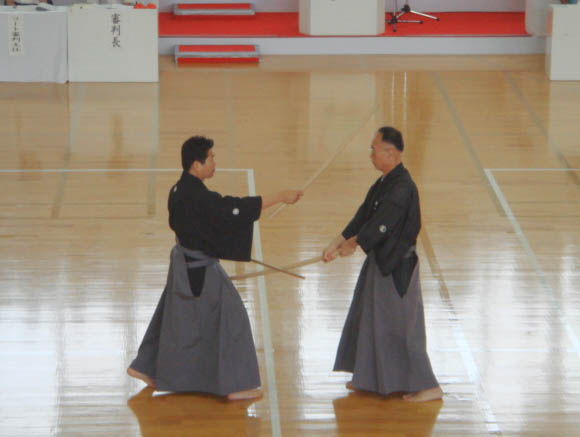
Demonstration at the All Japan Naginata Championship, May 2007

After the creation by Miyamoto Musashi, it is believed that the branch "Santō-ha" of the Hyōhō Niten Ichi-ryū kept unchanged the techniques created by the founder. The ryū arrived the 20th century with the 8th sōke (headmaster), Aoki Kikuo.

In 1961, Aoki Kikuo named one of his closest disciples, Gosho Motoharu, as shihan (master responsible for teaching the techniques of the ryū) and sōke daiken (adjunct successor) of the 9th generation, and other disciple, Kiyonaga Tadanao, as 9th sōke, with the goal to make sure that the techniques of the style were passed to the future generations. Before, in 1955, Gosho Motoharu had received menkyo kaiden, the license of total transmission in Hyōhō Niten Ichi-ryū and Sekiguchi-ryū, the two schools that Aoki Kikuo was headmaster.

Aoki Kikuo died in 1967. In the following years, the two masters continued representing the Niten Ichi-ryū in Japan.

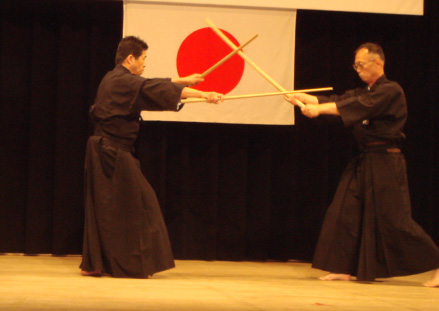
Hyōhō Niten Ichi-ryū Embu (demonstration), May 2007

In 1976, Kiyonaga Tadanao died suddenly, without leaving a designed successor. As Soke Daiken, Gosho Motoharu continued to represent the ryū on this period. After eight months without a sōke, the Kiyonaga family asked Gosho Motoharu to prepare Imai Massayuke, a kendo teacher of the same town, who made contact with the style months earlier interested in learning more about the bōjutsu of the Niten Ichi-ryū, to stay as 10th sōke, while the son of the 9th sōke, Kiyonaga Fumiya, would be the 11th sōke.

Gosho Motoharu taught to Imai Massayuke and Kiyonaga Fumiya all the curriculum of the ryū in the following months and years, and remained as the main responsible for the techniques teachings. Together, they represented the ryū on many occasions and countries, such as France (1983), China (1986) and Australia (1988).

In the end of the 1980s, the 10th sōke and the shihan splintered their ways. At this time, Gosho Motoharu was graded as iaido Hanshi Hachidan by the ZNIR, and was also responsible for Sekiguchi-ryū. Imai Massayuke did not receive menkyo kaiden in Hyōhō Niten Ichi-ryū from Gosho Motoharu, thus breaking the menkyo kaiden transmission.

At this time, there were changes in the kata of the ryū under Imai Massayuke. The techniques of the style became different of the style as taught by Aoki Kikuo. One of the best known records of the original techniques is the Nippon Budokan Archive, recorded in 1981 with Gosho Motoharu acting as uchidachi and the 10th sōke, Imai Massayuke, as shidachi.

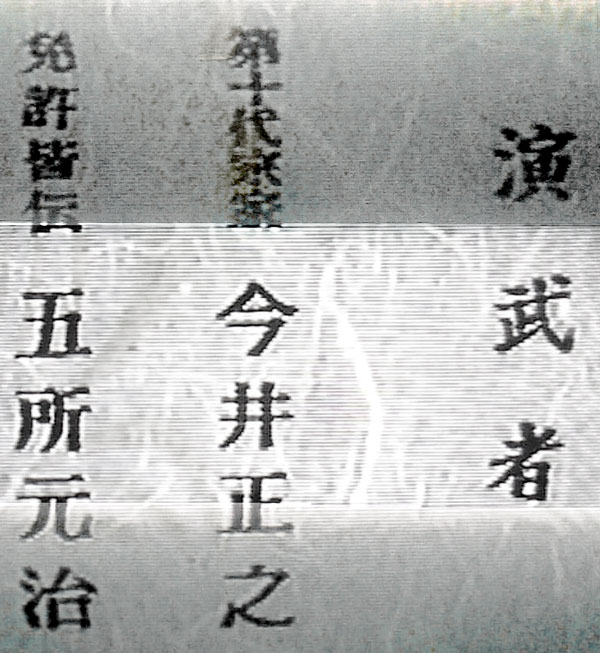
Snapshop of the NKK permanent archive video (1981)

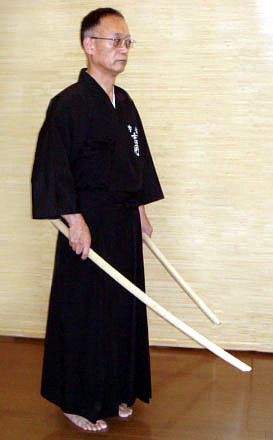
Yoshimoti Kiyoshi, 12th Successor of Hyōhō Niten Ichi-ryū

During the next 15 years, the original form of the katas were preserved by Gosho Motoharu and other students of the 8th sōke.

In November 2003, Imai Massayuke decided that the title sōke would no more be used in the ryū, and that there would be three 11th generations successors, who would be named as dai juichi. They were Kiyonaga Fumiya (son of the 9th sōke, Kiyonaga Tadanao) of Oita, Chin Kin (an old student of the 8th sōke, Aoki Kikuo) and Iwami Toshio from Kokura.

Imai-soke put the Jisso Emman no Bokuto, the wooden sword made by Miyamoto Musashi and traditional symbol of his successor, in guard of the Usa Jingu Shrine. Any of the daijuichi or their future successors have access to it by a limited period of time.

In 2004 Kiyonaga Fumiya (dai juichi) died. Most of the ryū members in Japan were his students and decided not to continue under the others successors, but to join Gosho Motoharu in order to give continuity to the original forms of the style.

So was founded the branch Gosho-ha Hyōhō Niten Ichi-ryū in 2004, with members in Japan, Brazil, Argentina, Hawaii and Chile.

The 10th soke, Imai Massayuke, died in 2006. In May 2007 the Oita Prefecture Kendo Department requested the Kiyonaga family and the Gosho Ha Niten Ichi-ryū masters to reestablish the seito (main line) of Kiyonaga Fumiya in Oita, where the ryū was based since the 9th generation. The Kiyonaga family designated Yoshimoti Kiyoshi, son of Gosho Motoharu and successor in Gosho-ha Hyōhō Niten Ichi-ryū, as Junidai (12th successor) of Hyōhō Niten Ichi-ryū Seito under Kiyonaga Fumiya's line.

The two lines were again unified under Yoshimoti Kiyoshi, 12th successor of Miyamoto Musashi, from an unbroken line in both Menkyo Kaiden transmission and recognized succession.

Others masters of the ryū under Yoshimoti Kiyoshi and Gosho Motoharu are Ishii Toyozumi and Shigematsu Isao in Japan (among others).

The two remaining successors of Imai Massayuke continue to represent the ryū with their own groups.

== Dispute ==
Iwami Toshio, one of the three daijuichi successors, disputes the sole representation of Hyōhō Niten Ichi-ryū, not recognizing the two other seito lines. His group alleges that Imai Massayuke changed his mind about having three successors after the decision of Kiyonaga Fumiya to follow without further contact with him and Iwami Toshio.

This group also alleges that Gosho Motoharu could not establish his family line (Gosho Ha) without the sanction of the present sōke. To this, the group of Gosho Motoharu and Yoshimoti Kyoshi responded that Gosho is shihan of the 9th generation. They also don't recognize the status of Iwami Toshio as present sōke.

The title of sōke is usually designated from one leader to the next. It is not a hereditary title in Hyōhō Niten Ichi-ryū. In 2003 Imai Massayuke, the 10th sōke, decided to end the use of this title in the ryū, a fact recognized by Nihon Kobudo Kyokai.

The legitimacy of succession by Yoshimoti is recognized by the Japanese budo community. In 2007, the year of the succession, he represented the ryū in some of the most important events of Japan, such as the Kyoto Taikai and the All Japan Naginata Championship.

In September 2007 the Kendo Nippon, the most important publication of Japan about the Sword Arts made an extensive report covering the succession by Yoshimoti.

About the changes in the katas made by Imai Massayuke, the Iwami Toshio's groups says that Imai Massaiyuke amalgamated and simplified the techniques for technical and didactic reasons. They carry on this altered version of the katas in their demonstrations, practices and seminars.

The group of Gosho Motoharu and Yoshimoti Kyoshi practices the original form of the kata as they were taught by the 8th soke. This group emphasizes the importance of preserving the essence and form of the techniques unchanged.

== Lineage ==
Per www.nitenichiryu.jp.

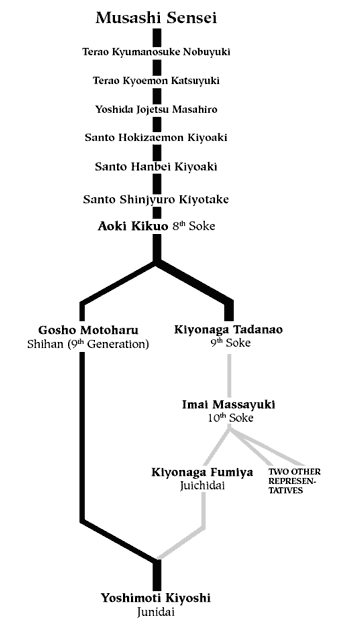
Gosho Ha Hyōhō Niten Ichi-ryū reintegrated with the Seito line under Yoshimoti Kyoshi

=== Seito Hyōhō Niten Ichi-ryū ===
Shinmen Musashi no Kami Fujiwara no Genshin (Miyamoto Musashi) 宮本 武蔵 藤原 玄信

||

Terao Kyūmanosuke Nobuyuki 寺尾 求馬助

||

Terao Gouemon Katsuyuki 寺尾 郷右衛門

||

Yoshida Josetsu Masahiro 吉田 如雪

||

Santō Hikozaemon Kiyohide 山東 彦左衛門

||

Santō Hanbē Kiyoaki 山東 半兵衛

||

Santō Shinjūrō Kiyotake 山東 新十郎

||

Aoki Kikuo Hisakatsu 青木 規矩男

||

Kiyonaga Tadanao 清長 忠直

||

Imai Masayuki 今井 正之

||

Kiyonaga Fumiya 清長 忠直

||

Yoshimoti (Yoshimochi) Kiyoshi (10th successor Gosho-ha Hyōhō Niten Ichi-ryū) 吉用 清

=== Gosho-ha Hyōhō Niten Ichi-ryū ===
Shinmen Musashi no Kami Fujiwara no Genshin (Miyamoto Musashi) 宮本 武蔵 藤原 玄信

||

Terao Kyūmanosuke Nobuyuki 寺尾 求馬助

||

Terao Gouemon Katsuyuki 寺尾 郷右衛門

||

Yoshida Josetsu Masahiro 吉田 如雪

||

Santō Hikozaemon Kiyohide 山東 彦左衛門

||

Santō Hanbē Kiyoaki 山東 半兵衛

||

Santō Shinjūrō Kiyotake 山東 新十郎

||

Aoki Kikuo Hisakatsu 青木 規矩男

||

Gosho Motoharu 五所 元治

||

Yoshimoti (Yoshimochi) Kiyoshi (12th successor Seito line) 吉用 清

== Techniques ==
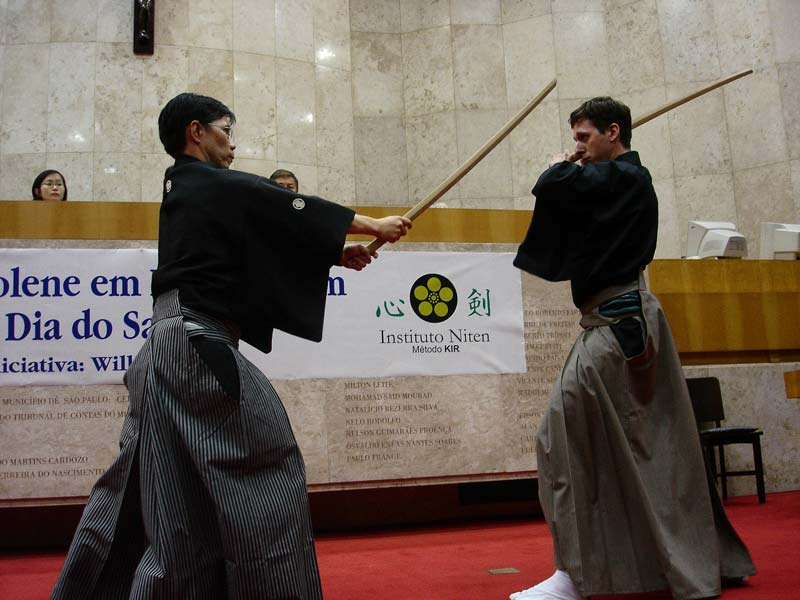
Tachi Seiho: 12 Katas with long sword

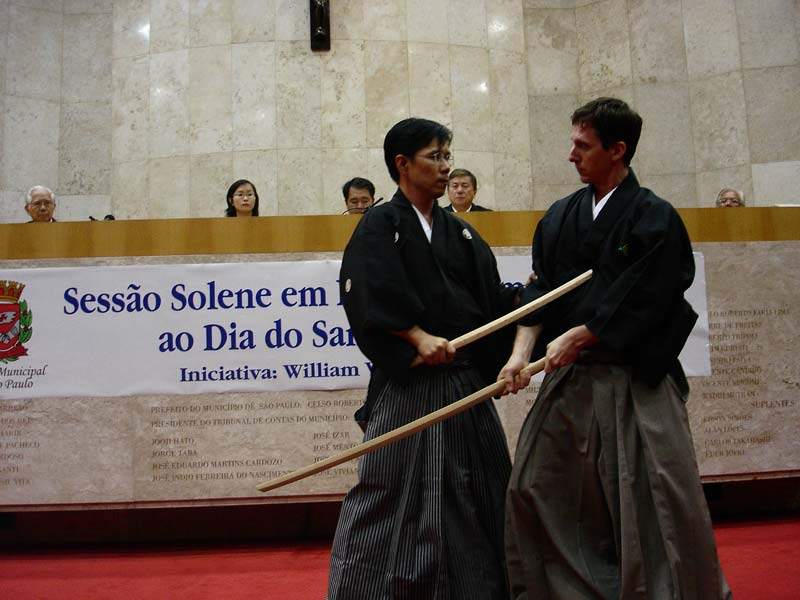
Kodachi Seiho: 7 Katas with short sword

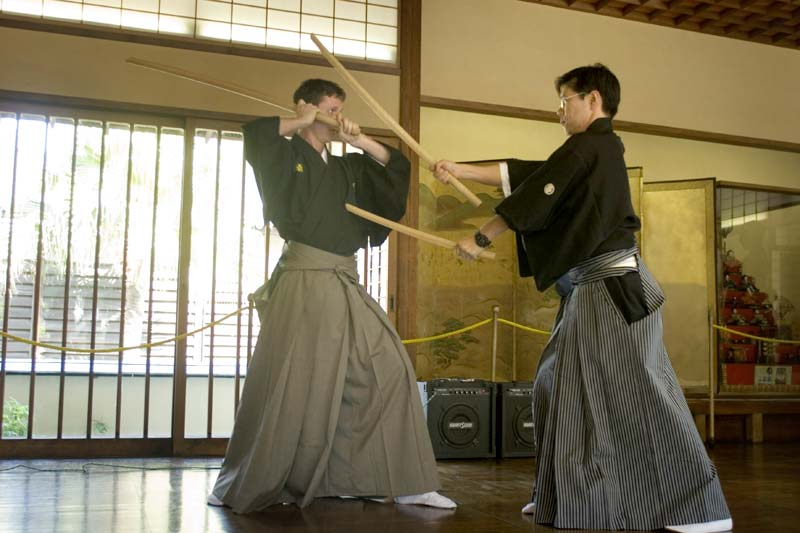
Nito Seiho: 5 Katas with two swords

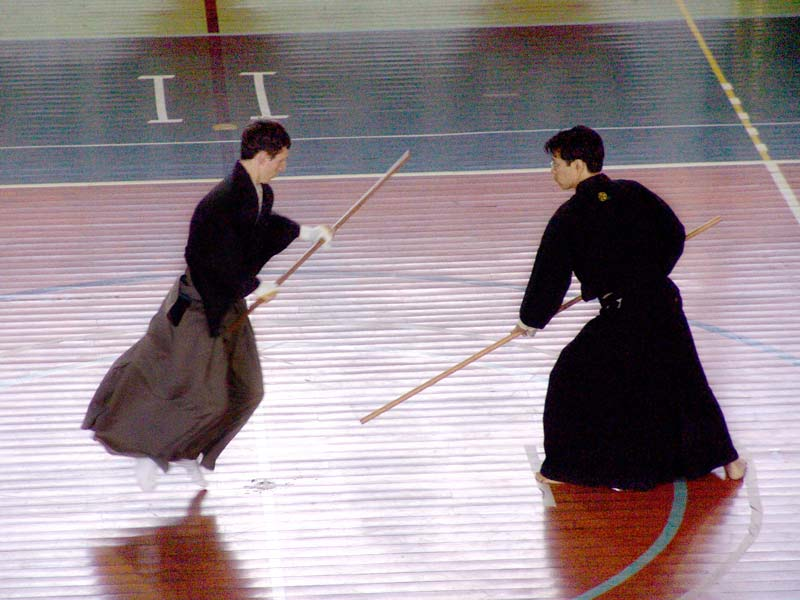
Bōjutsu: 20 Katas with long staff

The ryū is famous for its two-sword techniques. However, the style is composed also by techniques with single sword and short sword, and also techniques with staff.

Gosho Motoharu and Yoshimoti Kiyoshi preserves these techniques as they arrived the 20th century with the 8th sōke, Aoki Kikuo.

The Bokutō (wooden sword) used have unique attributes. They are made following the model of a Bokutō made by Miyamoto Musashi himself. Today in possession of the Usa Shrine (宇佐神宮) in Ōita, where the Hyōhō Niten Ichi-ryū members annually perform embu (demonstration) at the commemoration of the new year.

The ryū has the following techniques:

Tachi Seihō 太刀勢法—12 techniques with long sword

- Sassen
- Hassō Hidari
- Hassō Migi
- Uke Nagashi Hidari
- Uke Nagashi Migi
- Moji Gamae
- Haritsuke
- Nagashi Uchi
- Tora Buri
- Kazuki
- Aisen Uchidome
- Amashi Uchi

Kodachi Seihō 小太刀勢法—seven techniques with short sword

- Sassen
- Chūdan
- Uke Nagashi
- Moji Gamae
- Hari Tsuke
- Nagashi Uchi
- Aisen

Nitō Seihō 二刀勢法—five techniques with two swords (mentioned in The Book of Five Rings)

- Chūdan
- Jōdan
- Gedan
- Hidari Waki Gamae
- Migi Waki Gamae

Bōjutsu 棒術—20 techniques with staff

There are also kuden (口伝, "oral transmission") teachings, known only by advanced practitioners. These teachings are not other sets of techniques, but other ways to practice the above-mentioned techniques.

There are no other weapons in Hyōhō Niten Ichi-ryū besides tachi, kodachi, the two together and bō.

== Grades ==
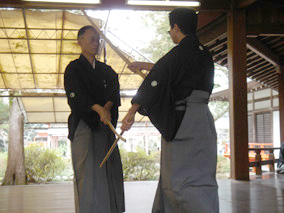
Demonstration in the Usa Shrine

Hyōhō Niten Ichi-ryū, as most kobudo ryū, does not use the Dan/Kyu system of graduation, but the traditional makimono (handscroll) system.

Each Makimono refers to a set of technique. All the licenses must be awarded in order. I.e.: One cannot receive okuden (by learning the two-sword techniques) before learning the long and short swords techniques (receiving Shoden and Chuden makimono).

The transmission of Menkyo Kaiden is the assurance that the ryū has the same form and methods created by the founder. Of the three representatives of the Seito line, Yoshimoti Kiyoshi is the only one who comes from an unbroken line of Menkyo Kaiden transmission.

1. Shoden: handed down to those who learned completely the katas of the Tachi Seiho.
2. Chuden: after Shoden, handed down to those who learned completely the katas of the Kodachi Seiho.
3. Okuden: after Chuden, handed down to those who learned completely the katas of the Nito Seiho.
4. Menkyo: After Okuden, handed down to those who learned completely the Bōjutsu katas.
5. Menkyo kaiden: handed down to those who assimilated the entire content of the ryū plus have a deep philosophical knowledge of the Way and of the teachings of the founder.

== Embu ==
Yoshimoti Kiyoshi frequently represents the ryū in important embu (demonstrations / 演舞).

In 2002 and 2007 he represented the ryū in the Kyoto Taikai, one of the most important events of martial arts in Japan, held every year in the Kyōto Butokuden.

In 2007 Yoshimoti Kiyoshi represent the ryū in other important budō events besides de Kyōto Taikai, such as the All Japan Naginata Championship and the Miyamoto Yori Taikai, in Kokura.

Another important embu, held every year and specially important for the members of the ryū, is the commemoration of the new year at the Usa Jingū Shrine, where the Miyamoto Musashi's bokutō is held. The Ōita Kendo Association appointed Yoshimochi Kiyoshi died 4 January 2020 leaving no successor. Please refer to his Japanese wiki page Kiyoshi Yoshimoti

== Places of practice ==
In Japan the ryū under Gosho Motoharu and Yoshimoti Kiyoshi is practiced mostly in Kyushu, specially in Usa, Oita, where the ryū has been based since the 1950s.
