= Furuhashi =

Furuhashi (Japanese: 古橋, lit. 'old bridge') is a Japanese surname. Notable people with the surname include:

- Ayaka Furuhashi (古橋 あや香), Japanese columnist
- Fumiko Furuhashi (古橋 富美子; born 1959), Japanese tennis player
- Furuhashi Sōzaemon (古橋 惣左衛門), Japanese samurai
- Gakuya Furuhashi (古橋 岳也; born 1987), Japanese boxer
- Genrokuro Furuhashi (古橋 源六郎; born 1932), Japanese bureaucrat
- Hideyuki Furuhashi (古橋 秀之; born 1971), Japanese science fiction writer
- Hironoshin Furuhashi (古橋 廣之進; 1928–2009), Japanese swimmer
- Kazuhiro Furuhashi (古橋 一浩; born 1960), Japanese anime director and screenwriter
- Koji Furuhashi (古橋 孝仁; born 1973), Japanese motorcycle racer
- Kyogo Furuhashi (古橋 亨梧; born 1995), Japanese footballer
- Maiyu Furuhashi (古橋 舞悠; born 1998), Japanese singer
- Makuru Furuhashi (古橋 真来; born 1993), Japanese ice hockey player
- Nobuyoshi Furuhashi (古橋 信孝; born 1943), Japanese literary scholar
- Ryutaro Furuhashi (古橋 柳太郎; 1882–1961), Japanese architect
- Sadayuki "Sada" Furuhashi, creator of OSD software project Fluentd
- Satoshi Furuhashi (古橋 智史; born 1988), Japanese businessman
- Takashi Furuhashi (mahjong player) (古橋 崇志; born 1985), Japanese mahjong player
- Takashi Furuhashi (musician) (古橋 崇; born 1972), Japanese music producer
- Takushiro Furuhashi (古橋 卓四郎; 1883–?), Japanese government administrator of annexed Korea
- Takuma Furuhashi (古橋 拓真; born 1980), Japanese announcer
- Tatsuya Furuhashi (古橋 達弥; born 1980), Japanese footballer
- Teiji Furuhashi (古橋 悌二; 1960–1995), Japanese LGBT contemporary artist
- Terunori Furuhashi (古橋 暉皃; 1813–1892), Japanese agriculturist
- Terushi Furuhashi (古橋 照司; born 1952), Japanese archer
- Yoshizane Furuhashi (古橋 義真; 1850–1909), Japanese Meiji-era civil policy advocate
- Yuichiro Furuhashi (古橋 由一郎; born 1965), Japanese American football player
