= Kiyoshi Yoshimoti =

Japanese swordsman (1948–2020)

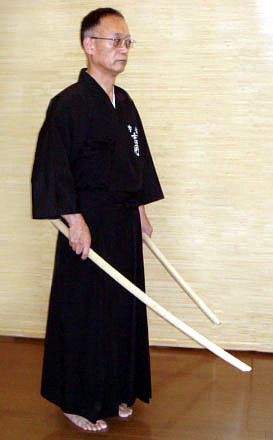
Yoshimoti Kiyoshi (2007)

Kiyoshi Yoshimoti (吉用 清, Yoshimochi Kiyoshi; 1948 in Usa, Ōita, Japan – 4 January 2020 in Usa, Ōita, Japan) was a Japanese swordsman.

His father, Gosho Motoharu, is one of the more important master of koryū budō of the region, being menkyo kaiden and shihan of two important schools, the Niten Ichi-ryū and the Sekiguchi-ryū.

Since his youth, Yoshimoti Kiyoshi practiced budō under his father's care, reaching menkyo kaiden in both Niten Ichi-ryū and Sekiguchi-ryū.

In 2007, attending to a request of the Ōita Kendo Association, the Kiyonaga family, the family of the late 9th sōke of the Niten Ichi-ryū (Kiyonaga Tadanao) and of the 11th successor (Kiyonaga Fumiya), chose Kiyoshi Yoshimoti to reestablish the main line of this school in Ōita. He became the 12th successor of Miyamoto Musashi, reintegrating his family line, the Gosho-ha Hyōhō Niten Ichi-ryū and the Seito line.
