= Parrying dagger =

Small bladed weapon

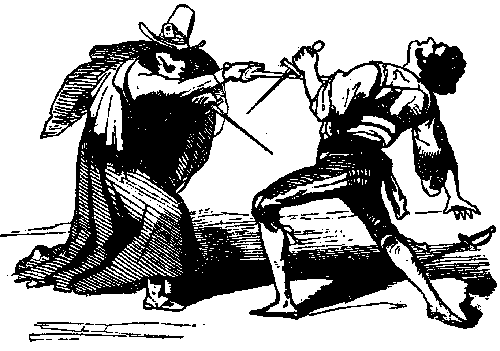
An example of unsuccessful main-gauche use

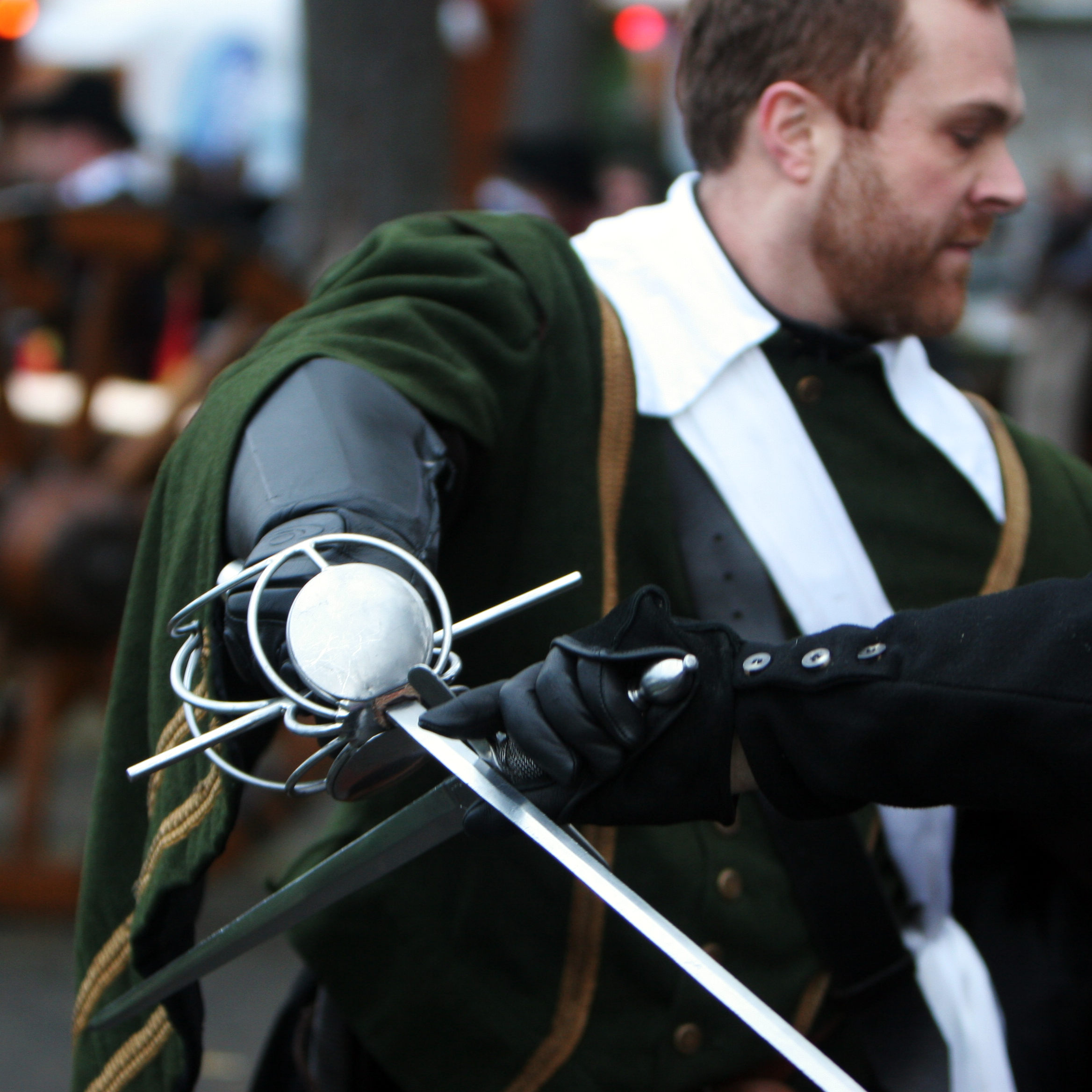
A parrying dagger demonstrated in a modern bout

The parrying dagger is a category of small handheld weapons from the European late Middle Ages and early Renaissance. These weapons were used as off-hand weapons in conjunction with a single-handed sword such as a rapier. As the name implies they were designed to parry, or defend, more effectively than a simple dagger form, typically incorporating a wider guard, and often some other defensive features to better protect the hand as well. They may also be used for attack if an opportunity arises. The general category includes two more specific types, the swordbreaker and trident dagger.

The use of this off-hand weapon gradually fell out of favor as sword fighting evolved into the modern sport of fencing. The use of progressively lighter primary weapons such as the small sword, épée, and foil allowed for greater speed since the fencer needed less protection for himself as double hits became more allowed in sport fencing.

== Early development ==
Parrying daggers were an important development of the ubiquitous quillion dagger form, appearing in the early to mid-16th century starting with the so-called left hand dagger. Although this is often used as a term of convenience for parrying daggers in general, it also refers more specifically to the earlier and simpler form of the weapon. It had stout quillons (straight or curved) for effective parrying as well as an additional guard in the form of a ring or shell on one side of the quillons where they crossed the grip. In addition to straight blades, there are examples of left hand daggers with wavy blades, those with saw edges and blades that are perforated along the central fuller with small holes, all designed to make the weapon lighter or to aid in defense. This form of dagger largely disappeared in the early 17th century in favor of the much more important main-gauche which was especially popular in Spain and Italy. The triple dagger and swordbreaker were rare and relatively late developments, first appearing around 1600. Parrying daggers were often made en suite, or similar in terms of construction and decorative technique, to the sword with which they were paired as a companion weapon.

== Dagger types ==
=== Main-gauche ===
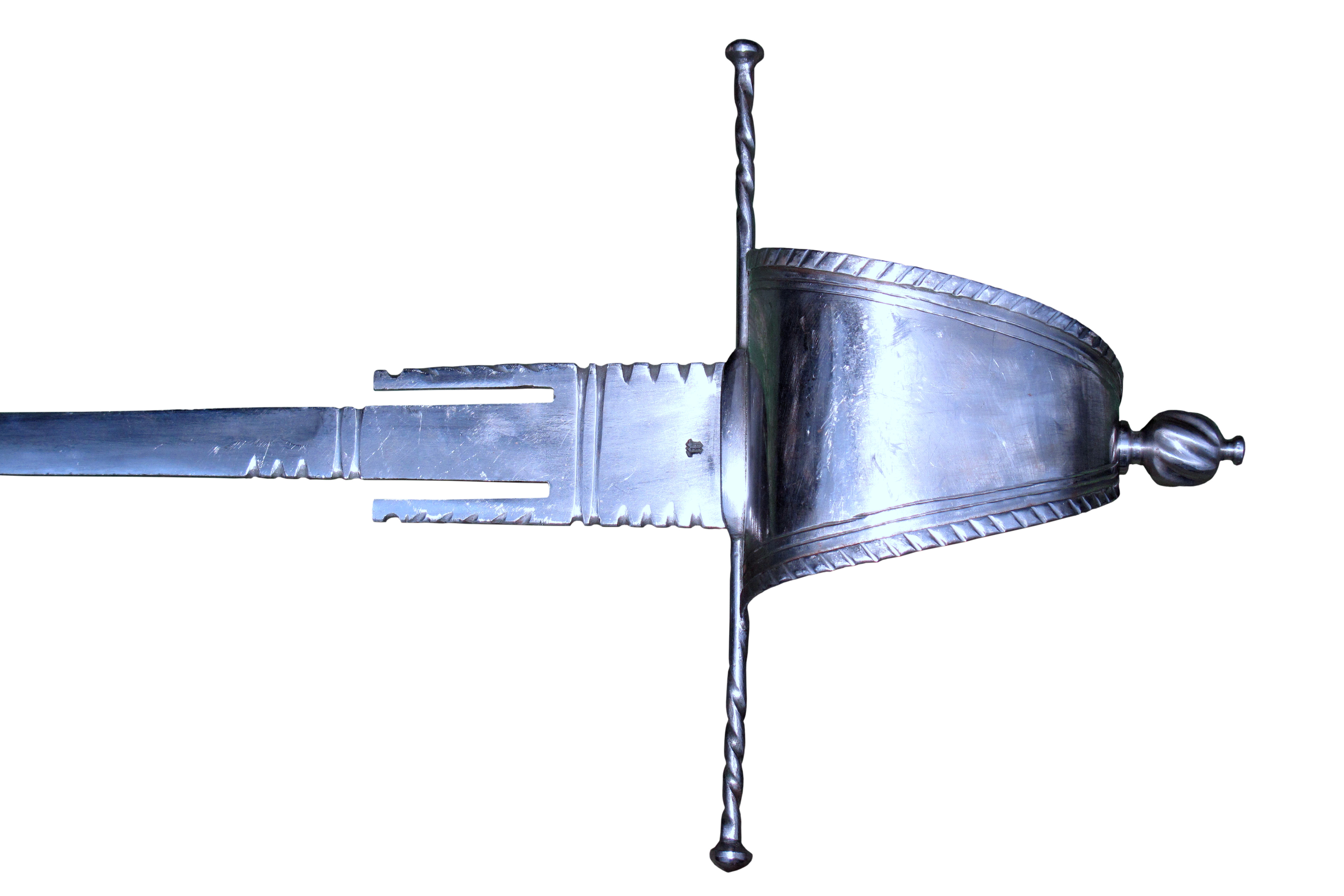
A main-gauche replica

The main-gauche (French for "left hand", pronounced [mɛ̃ ɡoʃ]) was used mainly to assist in defense by parrying enemy thrusts, while the dominant hand wielded a rapier or similar longer weapon intended for one-handed use. It was a relatively large dagger, having a longer and heavier blade (often measuring 19 in (480 mm) or slightly more in length) and very long, straight quillons. Its most characteristic feature was a wide knuckleguard that curved from the quillons to the pommel and protected the hand. The guard was usually (but not always) triangular in outline, and the quillons typically measured 11 in (280 mm) or more from tip to tip.

Since this style of dagger was usually made en suite with a cup-hilted rapier, the decoration of the knuckleguard tended to reflect that of the cup of the rapier. The edges of the guard are usually turned over toward the outside, possibly to trap the point of the opponent's blade and prevent it from slipping into the defender's hand. The quillons are normally cylindrical with knobbed tips, and in many instances are decorated with spiral fluting. The pommel is normally decorated to match the quillons and made to resemble the pommel of its matching rapier, while the grip is usually made of wood and wrapped with twisted and braided wire.

The blade is normally made in three distinct sections or zones. The first section, near the hilt, comprises the ricasso (unsharpened portion) which is flat-sided and slightly beveled at the edges with one or two small holes at its forward end. In some examples there are two arms running parallel to the sides of the ricasso with spaces in between, designed to catch the opponent's blade in a manner similar to the curved quillons of a dagger. On the side of the ricasso opposite the knuckleguard there is usually an oval depression for the thumb. The second section of the blade is normally single-edged with a flat triangular cross-section. The edge faces the wielder's left when the dagger is held in the ready position. The back of the blade (the dull edge) in this section is usually filed with a series of grooves or notches. The third and longest section of the blade extends to the point, and is double-edged with a diamond cross-section. It will occasionally have notches or serrations for a short distance along the edge which corresponds to the back of the previous zone. Although this form is typical, numerous variations can be found including those with curved quillons, rounded guards or blades with only two sections. These various forms reached their peak of development in the late 17th century and, despite a period of decline, the weapon continued to be used even into the 18th century.

=== Swordbreaker ===
Schematics of a swordbreaker of the early 17th century

The swordbreaker was a dagger that had large, deep serrations along one side of the blade, resembling the barbed teeth of a comb and designed to entrap an opponent's blade, allowing a variety of follow-up techniques. Like the triple dagger, the swordbreaker was a rare form of parrying dagger compared to the main-gauche, partly due to the difficulty of crafting such a specialised weapon. One Italian example dated around 1600 can be found in the Wallace Collection in London and has a hilt consisting of a pair of straight quillons and a ring guard.

Despite the name swordbreaker, it is uncertain whether they could in fact break sword blades as suggested by some scholars, as swords of this era were intended to stand up to substantial forces, well in excess of what could be generated by a fighter's off-hand. Swords are sometimes depicted in Fechtbüchern as withstanding a two-handed attempt to break them (or show off their resilience). Late Renaissance rapiers and smallswords may not be as robust as the cutting swords of earlier times, however, and have indeed been known to break on occasion, so the claim may have more veracity in relation to the typical civilian weapons of this period.

The term is also applied in modern times to the various devices (such as hooks or spikes) found on some bucklers which served the same purpose as the parrying dagger to entrap an opponent's blade.

=== Trident dagger ===
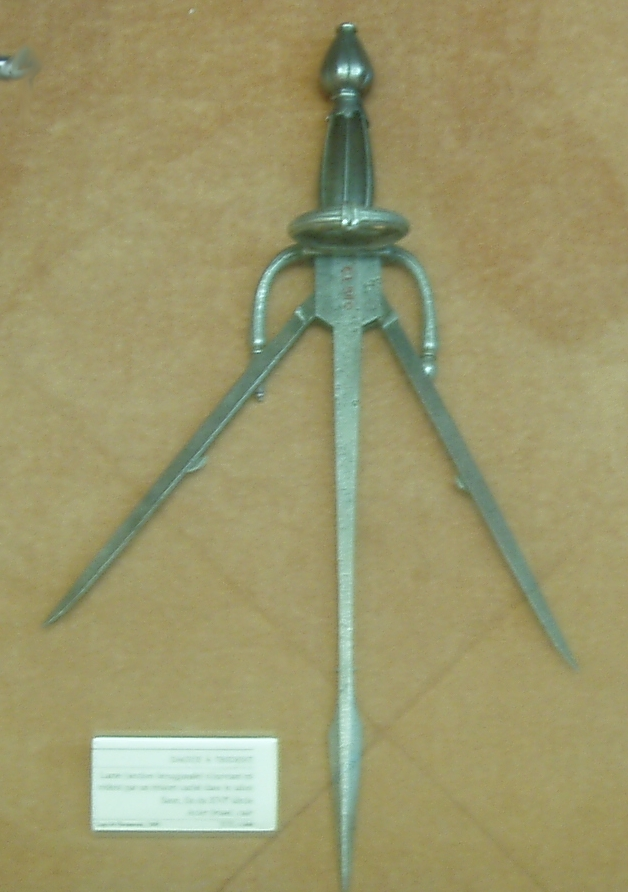
Trident dagger, 16th century, made in Germany. Picture taken at the Château d'Écouen, France.

Trident daggers (or triple daggers) have blades divided lengthwise into three parts which fold together to resemble a conventional blade. When a mechanism near the hilt is released the two side blades open under spring pressure to form the "trident", flying apart until they are stopped by the ends of the curved quillons. This creates a dagger capable of trapping blades more securely and easily. Like the swordbreaker, the triple dagger was a rare form of parrying dagger compared to the main-gauche.

== Modern usage ==
An off-hand weapon is rarely used in modern sport competition. In fact, the use of the off-hand as a defensive measure is often prohibited by the rules of many sport fighting styles that are common in the Western world today. However, in HEMA (historical European martial arts) Rapier and Dagger is a common sparring method, and backsword and dagger is also practised. Another exception is kendo where the use of two shinai of different size is allowed but uncommon; this style is known as nito-ryu (literally "two sword-style"). Several other fighting styles not only incorporate but even promote off-hand weapons, for example classical styles of Filipino Martial Arts which commonly have Espada y Daga ("sword-and-dagger") systems. Simultaneous use of two weapons is also frequently featured in fiction, particularly in video games, literature, and other media from the fantasy genre, where it is commonly dubbed "dual wielding". In the Society for Creative Anachronism (SCA), rapier combat makes use of various forms of off-hand device, including parrying daggers, batons, cloaks, and a second sword, which in fencing is termed a "case of rapier".

== See also ==
- Buckler
- Jian (sword breaker)
- Companion weapon
- Dagger
- Eskrima
- Hyoho Niten Ichi-ryu
- Jitte
- Katar
- List of daggers
- Sai
