= Terao Magonojō =

Swordsman during the Edo period (1611–1672)

Terao Magonojō (寺尾 孫之允, 1611 – November 8, 1672) was a famed swordsman during the Edo period (17th century) of Japan. Magonojo was the elder brother of Terao Motomenosuke, the successor to the School of Musashi. Magonojo has been noted as Miyamoto Musashi's favorite student, to whom Musashi entrusted his Gorin no sho (Book of Five Rings) before his death. Throughout Magonojo's early years working alongside Musashi, he trained with the kodachi, a type of short sword. On one occasion when they were training together, Musashi attacked Magonojo with a large wooden sword, which Terao parried with his short wooden sword and counterattacked. After several repetitions of this action, Terao's sword broke while Musashi was in the middle of striking his sword from above; however, Musashi's swing stopped just shy of hitting Terao's forehead. Magonojo received no injury, showing Musashi's skill with the weapon and high level of control. Before the death of Magonojo's master, he assumed the role of successor, which was subsequently passed on to his younger brother. It is thought that Magonojo burned the original Gorin no sho on Musashi's orders, because the complete original version cannot be found.
