= Furuhashi Sōzaemon =

Japanese samurai of the Edo period

Furuhashi Sōzaemon (古橋 惣左衛門; ? - ?) was a Japanese samurai of the early Edo period. Famed for his skill in swordsmanship. Sōzaemon, along with both Terao Magonojo, and his younger brother Terao Motomenosuke would be the legendary Miyamoto Musashi's three chosen successors. After their master's death, Sōzaemon had borrowed Magonojo's Gorin no sho (given by Musashi) for a few days, in which he made a copy of this book and gave it to Lord Hosokawa Mitsuhisa through his orders. Furuhashi himself would also make another copy of the book which was later transmitted to his disciples, which went by the name of Ihon gorin no sho. The following copy ends with this notice:

- The twelfth of the fifth month of the second year of Shoho 1645
- Shinmen Musashi no kami Genshin
- For the Honorable Terao Magonojo
- For the Honorable Furuhashi Sōzaemon

Overall, in the end, it is known that people as of today would not have the capacity of being able to read the Gorin no sho if Sōzaemon had not have copied it through his master's orders. Due to this fact, Sōzaemon is largely responsible for the fame of Musashi's work.
