= Dual wield =

Technique of using two weapons, one in each hand, for training or combat

Mongolian soldiers dual wielding knives during skills display

Dual wielding is the technique of using two weapons, one in each hand, for training or combat. It is not a common combat practice. Although historical records of dual wielding in war are limited, there are numerous weapon-based martial arts that involve the use of a pair of weapons. The use of a companion weapon is sometimes employed in European martial arts and fencing, such as a parrying dagger. Miyamoto Musashi, a Japanese swordsman and ronin, created a particular style of swordsmanship involving the use of two swords.

In terms of firearms, especially handguns, dual wielding is generally denounced by firearm enthusiasts due to its impracticality. Though using two handguns at the same time confers an advantage by allowing more ready ammunition, it is rarely done due to other aspects of weapons handling.

Dual wielding, both with melee and ranged weapons, has been popularized by fictional works (film, television, and video games).

== History ==
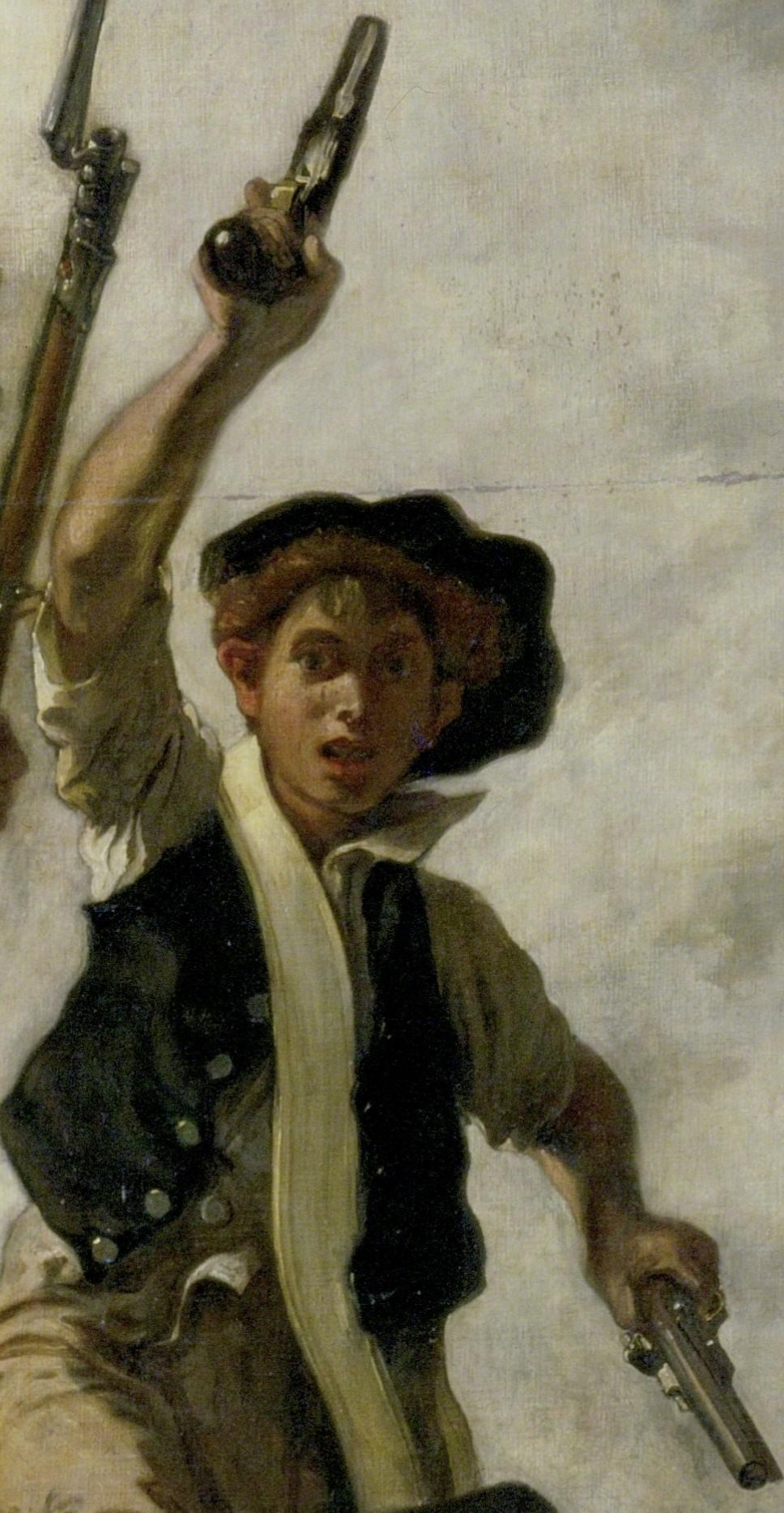
An urban proletariat boy dual wields pistols in Eugène Delacroix's painting La Liberté guidant le peuple.

Dual wielding has not been used or mentioned much in military history, though it appears in weapon-based martial arts and fencing practices.

The dimachaerus was a type of Roman gladiator that fought with two swords. Thus, an inscription from Lyon, France, mentions such a type of gladiator, here spelled dymacherus. The dimachaeri were equipped for close-combat fighting. A dimachaerus used a pair of siccae (curved scimitar) or gladius and used a fighting style adapted to both attack and defend with his weapons rather than a shield, as he was not equipped with one.

The use of weapon combinations in each hand has been mentioned for close combat in western Europe during the Byzantine, Medieval, and Renaissance era. The use of a parrying dagger such as a main gauche along with a rapier is common in historical European martial arts.

North American Indian tribes of the Atlantic northeast used a form involving a tomahawk in the primary hand and a knife in the secondary. It is practiced today as part of the modern Cree martial art Okichitaw.

All the above-mentioned examples involve either one long and one short weapon, or two short weapons. An example of a dual wield of two sabres is the Ukrainian cossack dance hopak.

=== Asia ===
During the campaign Muslim conquest in 6th to 7th century AD, Rashidun caliphate general Khalid ibn Walid was reported to favor wielding two broad swords, with one in each hand, during combat.

Traditional schools of Japanese martial arts include dual wield techniques, particularly a style conceived by Miyamoto Musashi involving the katana and wakizashi, two-sword kenjutsu techniques he called Niten Ichi-ryū.

Eskrima, the traditional martial arts of the Philippines teaches Doble Baston techniques involving the basic use of a pair of rattan sticks and also Espada y daga or Sword/Stick and Dagger. Okinawan martial arts have a method that uses a pair of sai.

Chinese martial arts involve the use of a pair of butterfly swords or hook swords.

Famed for his enormous strength, Dian Wei, a military general serving under the warlord Cao Cao in the late Eastern Han dynasty of China, excelled at wielding a pair of ji (a halberd-like weapon), each of which was said to weigh 40 jin.

Chen An, a warlord who lived during the Jin dynasty (266–420) and Sixteen Kingdoms period, wielded a sword in one hand and a serpent spear in the other, supposedly measuring at 7 chi and 1 zhang 8 chi respectively.

During Ran Wei–Later Zhao war, Ran Min, emperor of the short-lived Ran Wei empire of China, wielded two weapons, one in each hand, and fought fiercely, inflicting many casualties on the Xianbei soldiers while mounted on the famous horse Zhu Long ("Red Dragon").

Gatka, a weapon-based martial art from the Punjab region, is known to use two sticks at a time.

The Thailand weapon-based martial art Krabi Krabong involves the use of a separate Krabi in each hand.

Kalaripayattu teaches advanced students to use either two sticks (of various sizes) or two daggers or two swords, simultaneously.

=== Modern ===
The use of a gun in each hand is often associated with the American Old West, mainly due to media portrayals. It was common for people in the era to carry two guns, but not to use them at the same time. The second gun served as a backup weapon, to be used only if the main one suffered a malfunction or was lost or emptied.

However, there were several examples of gunmen in the West who used two pistols at the same time in their gunfights:

- John Wesley Hardin killed a gunman named Benjamin Bradley who shot at him, by drawing both of his pistols and firing back.
- The Mexican vaquero Augustine Chacon had several gunfights in which he was outnumbered by more than one gunman and prevailed by equipping himself with a revolver in each hand.
- King Fisher once managed to kill three bandits in a shootout by pulling both of his pistols.
- During the Four Dead in Five Seconds Gunfight, lawman Dallas Stoudenmire pulled both of his pistols as he ran out onto the street and killed one bystander and two other gunmen.
- Jonathan R. Davis, a prospector during the California Gold Rush, was ambushed by thirteen outlaws while together with two of his comrades. One of his friends was killed and the other was mortally wounded during the ambush. Davis drew both of his revolvers and fired, killing seven of the bandits, and killing four more with his bowie knife, causing the final two to flee.

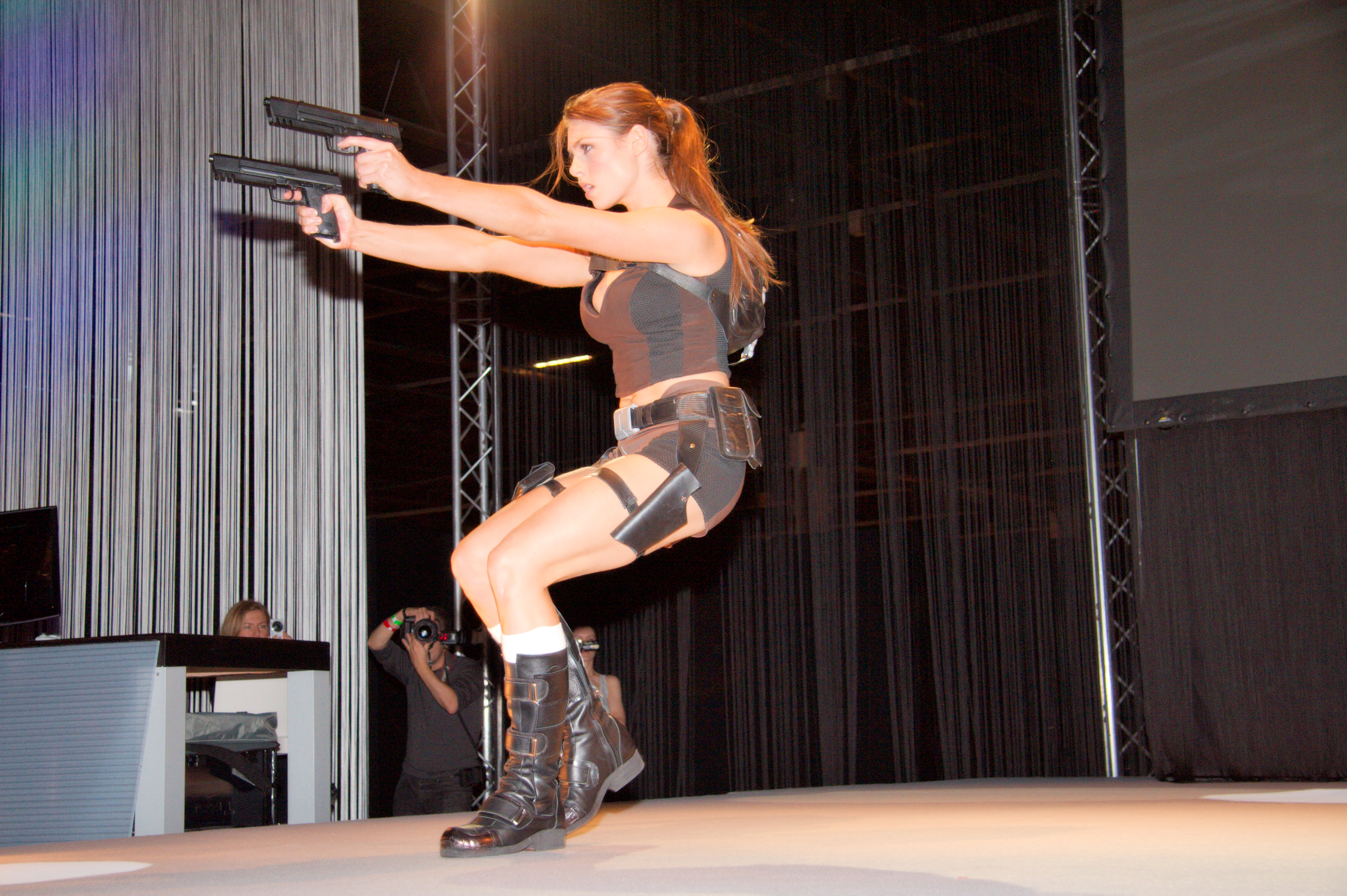
Model dressed as Lara Croft dual wielding pistols

Dual wielding two handguns has been popularized by film and television.

In Russian-language usage, firing two pistols simultaneously is referred to as "Macedonian-style shooting" (Russian: Стрельба по-македонски), a practice involving the use of two pistols, one in each hand.

== Effectiveness ==
MythBusters compared many firing stances, including having a gun in each hand, and found that, compared to the two-handed single-gun stance as a benchmark, only the one-handed shoulder-level stance with a single gun was comparable in terms of accuracy and speed. The ability to look down the sights of the gun was given as the main reason for this. In an episode the following year, they compared holding two guns and firing simultaneously—rather than alternating left and right shots—with holding one gun in the two-handed stance, and found that the results were in favor of using two guns and firing simultaneously.

== In media ==
- The Teenage Mutant Ninja Turtles features dual wielding being done by Leonardo with two katana swords, Raphael with two sais, and Michelangelo with two nunchucks. Sometimes, their arch enemy Shredder dual wields with many weapons.
- Princess Mononoke features Lady Eboshi dual wielding with a katana sword and a hairpin.
- The Marvel Comics features dual wielding being done by Deadpool with two katana swords, Nightcrawler with two sabres, Elektra with two sais, and Black Widow with two pistols and two batons.
- The DC Comics features Dick Grayson and Barbara Gordon dual wielding two bastons.
- The Star Wars franchise features many characters dual wielding two lightsabers or more including Darth Vader, Ahsoka Tano, and General Grievous. Star Wars: The Clone Wars features Palpatine and his former apprentice Darth Maul dual wielding two lightsabers each. Also, characters dual wielding two blaster pistols include Jango Fett and Bo-Katan Kryze.
- The 1997 Nintendo 64 first-person shooter video game GoldenEye 007 allows the player to dual wield most of the game's weapons.
- The Halo franchise allows dual-wielding weapons in Halo 2 and Halo 3.
- The Chronicles of Narnia: The Lion, the Witch and the Wardrobe features the centaur general Oreius dual wielding two longswords, and also the oppressive White Witch doing the same. It also features the Minotaur general Otmin dual wielding a falchion sword and a battle axe.
- Ip Man 3 features butterfly swords being dual wielded by Ip Man and Cheung Tin-chi.
- The Hobbit and The Lord of the Rings features the wizard Gandalf dual wielding a magic staff and a mystic longsword.
- The Mummy Returns features the adventurous Egyptologist Evelyn O'Connell and the treacherous Anck-su-namun dual wielding two sais.
- The Pirates of the Caribbean franchise features characters dual wielding two swords including Jack Sparrow, Will Turner, and Elizabeth Swann.
- The martial arts film Crouching Tiger, Hidden Dragon features Michelle Yeoh as Yu Shu Lien dual wielding with a dao sword which splits into two smaller swords, and also using two hook swords.
- The Three Musketeers features many characters dual fighting with rapiers and daggers.
- Mighty Morphin Power Rangers features Tommy Oliver dual wielding a sword and a dagger.
- Robin of Sherwood features Nasir, a Saracen assassin who dual wields two scimitars.
- Avatar: The Last Airbender features dual wielding done by Zuko with two dao swords, Jet with two hook swords, Suki with two war fans, and Sokka with a machete along a club or a boomerang.
- The Transformers features dual wielding being done by many characters including Optimus Prime and Optimus Primal with two swords.
- Kung Fu Hustle features iron rings being dual wielded by the humble tailor of Pigsty Alley.
- Power Rangers: Jungle Fury features dual wielding being done by Casey Rhodes with two nunchaku and also two dao-themed Shark Sabres, Theo Martin with two tonfa and then two tessan-themed Jungle Fans, and Camille with two sai.
- The Marvel Cinematic Universe film Shang-Chi and the Legend of the Ten Rings features the Ten Rings, which are dual wielded by Wenwu and his son Shang-Chi.
- The musical version of The Lion King features Mufasa and his son Simba dual wielding two akrafena swords to fight.
- Lara Croft, the heroine of the Tomb Raider franchise, dual wields two pistols.
- Dante, the protagonist of the Devil May Cry series, dual wields two pistols, named Ebony and Ivory.
- Kirito, the protagonist of Sword Art Online, is known for being able to wield two swords of a similar length at the same time.
- Sora and Roxas of the Kingdom Hearts franchise have the ability to dual wield Keyblades.
- The Splatoon series features Dualies, a weapon class that debuted in Splatoon 2 that involves dual wielding guns. The guns also enable the player to execute a dodge roll for enhanced mobility and accuracy.
- In Borderlands 2, Salvador's unique action skill allows him to temporarily dual-wield any of the game's many guns.
- Dual wielding is a signature element of the Max Payne video game series, particularly in the third game where every one-handed weapon can be dual wielded.
- The Titan Quest video game series offers dual wielding as an unlockable ability for the Warrior mastery, allowing players to wield both melee and throwable weapons in both hands.
- Edward Kenway, the protagonist of Assassin's Creed IV: Black Flag, was a skilled swordsman and developed the ability to fight using two swords (one in each hand). He was also adept at using other weapons such as pistols, knives, axes, and muskets, even employing dual combinations of these weapons.
- Connor Kenway, the protagonist of Assassin's Creed III, received minimal combat training from the Kanien'kehá:ka (or Mohawk), becoming a young warrior of the North American tribe. He used a fighting style that involved wielding a tomahawk in his dominant hand and carrying a dagger in his off-hand. In addition to these, he was also capable of wielding various weapons, including a bow, flintlock pistols, poison darts, rope darts, and two hidden blades. He could use several combinations of these weapons simultaneously, thanks to his ambidexterity. Furthermore, his left hidden blade was a pivoting blade, which quickly became an indispensable tool in his arsenal.

== See also ==
- Ambidexterity
- Cross-dominance
- Dimachaerus
- Gun fu
- Swordsmanship
- Niten Ichi-ryū
