= Gosho Motoharu =

Japanese martial artist (1919–2012)

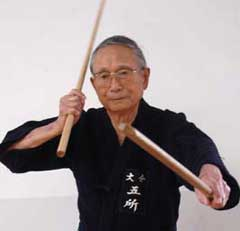
Shihan Gosho Motoharu

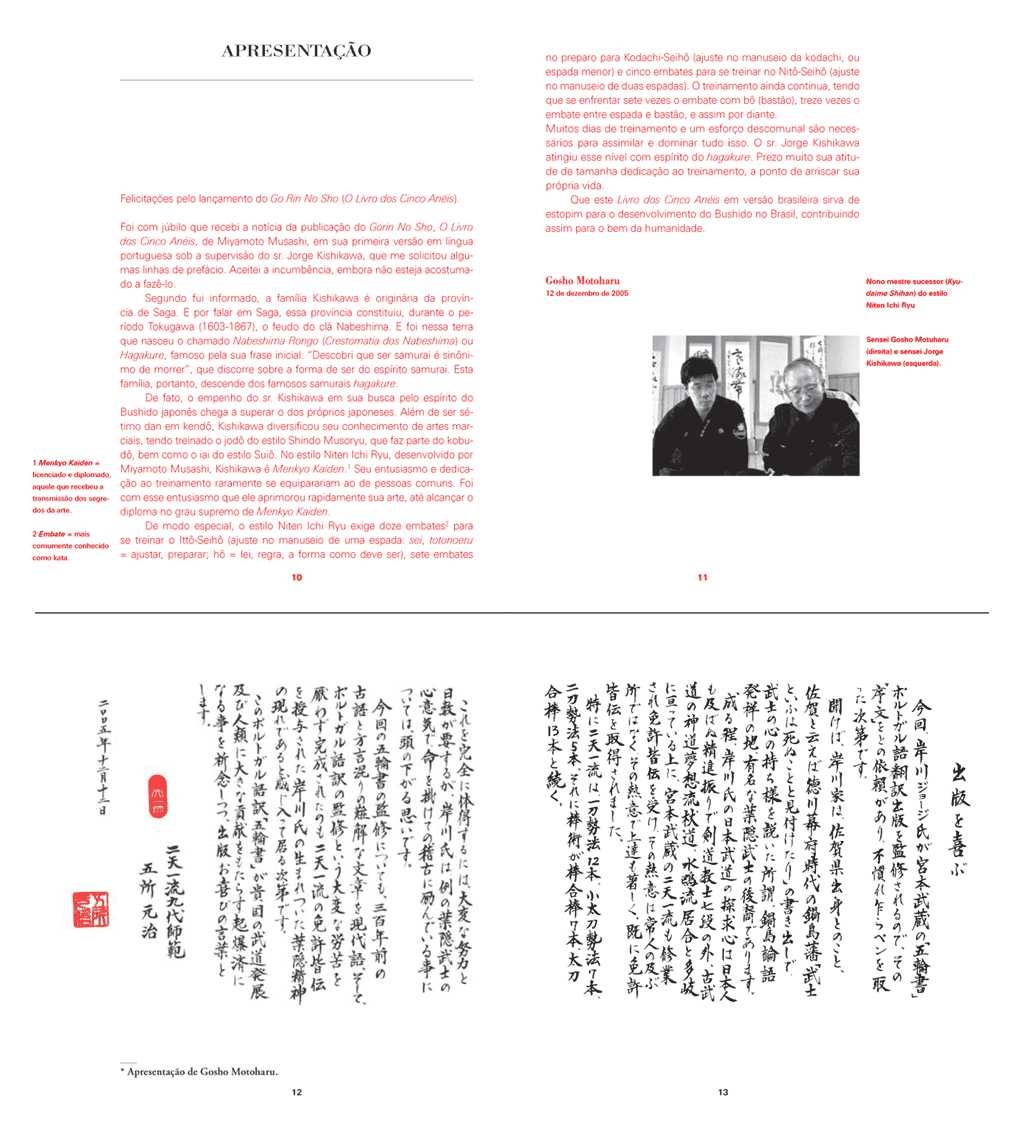
Shihan Gosho Motoharu's presentation in the Brazilian edition of the Book of Five Rings, by Miyamoto Musashi

Gosho Motoharu (五所 元治; 1919 – October 27, 2012) was a prominent Japanese master of the martial arts, koryū budō or kobudō.

The shihan (master), of the schools Niten Ichi-ryū (created by the famous rōnin Miyamoto Musashi) and Sekiguchi-ryū, Gosho Motoharu was awarded the rank of menkyo kaiden, in both schools. He was also an iaido 8th dan and kendo 7th dan.

Gosho Motoharu was a close disciple of the 8th sōke (headmaster) of the Niten Ichi-ryū and 14th sōke of Sekiguchi-ryū, master Aoki Kikuo. He was chosen by Aoki to be shihan and adjunct successor of both schools to ensure the teachings to the future generations.

He was the headmaster of the Gosho-ha Hyōhō Niten Ichi-ryū, which was the only branch of the ryū to keep the teachings as they arrived the 20th century with Aoki. In 2007, his son, Yoshimochi Kiyoshi, succeeded Kiyonaga Fumiya, as 11th successor, at the request of the Kiyonaga family, and become the 12th successor (daijunidai seito shihan) of Hyōhō Niten Ichi-ryū, reuniting the Gosho-ha and Seito (main) lineages.

== Biography ==
- 1919 — Born in Oita-ken, Usa-shi
- 1929 — Start learning budo.
- 1961 — Receive the title of shihan and adjunct successor of the koryū schools Niten Ichi-ryū and Sekiguchi-ryū by their headmaster, Aoki Kikuo.
- 1966 — Receive the grade of kendo Kyoshi nanadan (7th dan)
- 1981 — Represents the Niten Ichi-ryū in the official archive of the Nihon Budokan.
- 1983 — Represents the Niten Ichi-ryū in Paris, in a demonstration broadcast by the NHK network in all Japan. In the same occasion gave classes on Niten Ichi-ryū to the French Police (by Nihon Budokan).
- 1986 — Represents the Niten Ichi-ryū in Beijing and Shanghai (by Nihon Budokan).
- 1988 — Represents the Niten Ichi-ryū in Australia in the commemoration of the national 200 years anniversary (by Nihon Budokan).
- 1989 — Receive the grade of iaido hanshi hachidan (8th dan).
- 2004 — Requested by other masters of the Niten Ichi-ryū, founds the Gosho-ha Hyōhō Niten Ichi-ryū, to preserve the original teachings of the school.
- 2006 — Writes the presentation of the Brazilian edition of Miyamoto Musashi's Book of Five Rings (Gorin No Sho)
- 2007 — By request of the Ōita Kendo Association, the main lineage of the school is reestablished at USA. His son, Kiyoshi Yoshimoti becomes the 12th successor of Niten Ichi-ryū.
- 2012 — Died on October 27, 2012, at Ōita, Japan, at the age of 93 years.

Shihan Gosho transmitted the original teachings of Hyōhō Niten Ichi-ryū to the masters Kiyoshi Yoshimoti, Ishii Toyozumi, Shigematsu Isao, and Jorge Kishikawa.
