= Companion weapon =

Object held in the non-sword hand while fencing

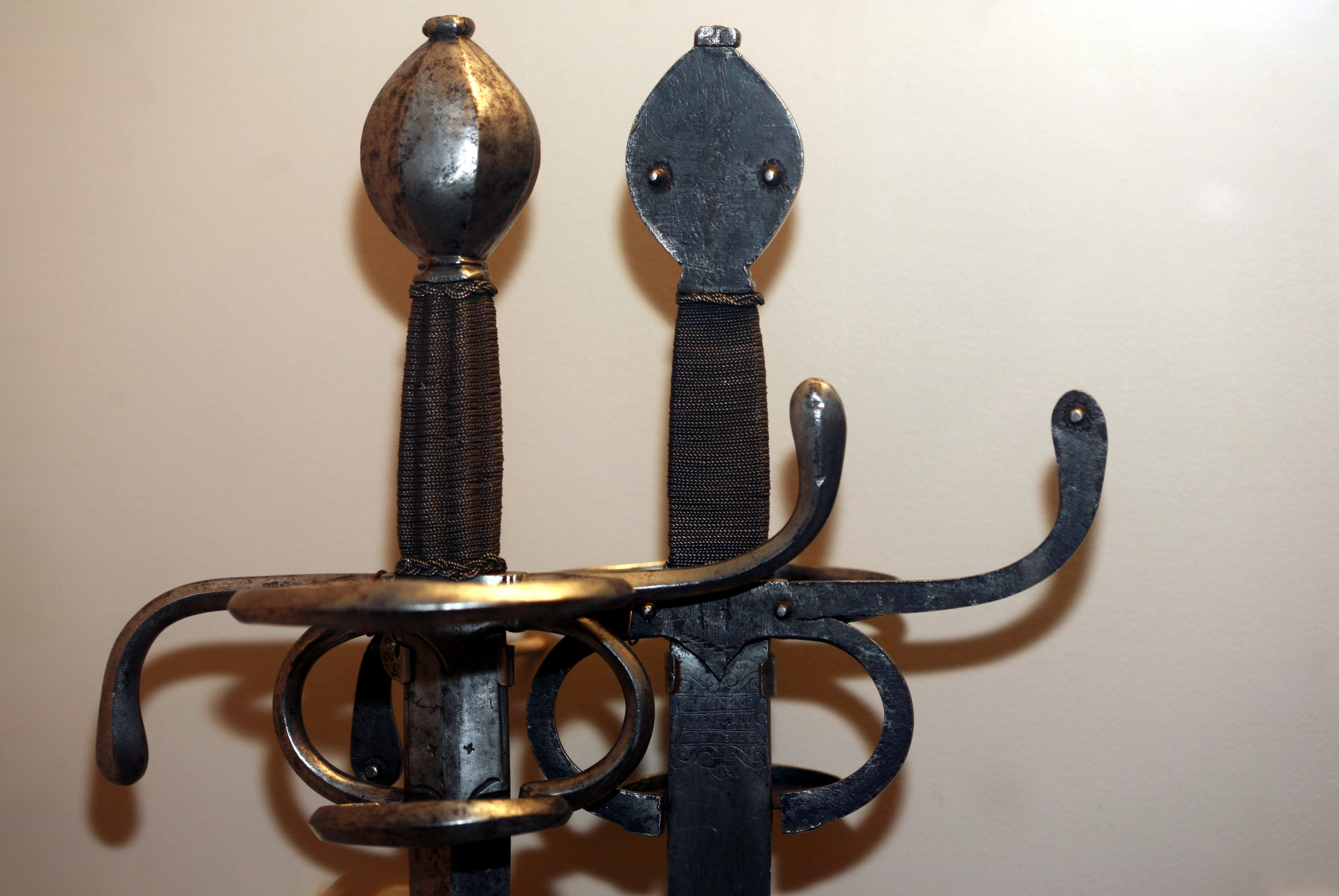
Twin swords, made to fit in one scabbard. One of the swords is used offensively, and that other as main gauche.

The term companion weapon is used in historical European martial arts to refer to an item used in conjunction with the larger weapon in the non-sword hand while fencing with a rapier or sword. The popular companion weapon forms include:

- sword and buckler
- sword/rapier and parrying dagger
- rapier and cloak

In most cases the off-hand weapon is used to deflect or parry.

== See also ==
- Daishō
- Retiarius
