= Terao Motomenosuke =

Japanese swordsman (1621–1688)

Terao Motomenosuke (寺尾 求馬助; 1621 – July 9, 1688) was a famed swordsman during the Edo period (17th century) of Japan. Motomenosuke would become rather famous for being the first successor to the School of Musashi that had been established by the legendary Miyamoto Musashi. When Musashi was aware of the fact that he was near death, he gave Motomenosuke both of his swords and a certificate of complete transmission. Motomenosuke later declined, and sent Musashi's swords and certificate to Miyamoto Iori (Musashi's adopted son) thinking it would be more fitting. Iori replied to Motomenosuke saying, "I can be heir to the name and warrior's honor of Musashi, but I cannot take on the succession of his school. It is my wish that you, to whom Musashi passed on his art, succeed him. Please be kind enough to accept.". Thus, Motomenosuke accepted Musashi's request out of great respect and consideration toward his deceased master. Motomenosuke had a fourth son that he had seen potential within, a man by the name of Shinmen Bensuke whom he had later made the successor. Thus Motomenosuke would continue to expand the School of Musashi while reflecting great admiration towards his late master.
