= The Book of Five Rings =

Text on kenjutsu and the martial arts in general

- Author: Miyamoto Musashi
- Original title: 五輪書
- Genre: Kenjutsu and the martial arts
- Publication date: 1645

The Book of Five Rings (五輪書, Go Rin no Sho) is a text on kenjutsu and martial arts in general, written by the Japanese swordsman Miyamoto Musashi between 1643 and 1645. The book title is from the godai (五大) of Buddhist esotericism (密教), and thus has five volumes: "Earth, Water, Fire, Wind, Sky." Many translations have been made, and it has garnered broad attention in East Asia and throughout the world. For instance, some business leaders find its discussion of conflict to be relevant to their work. The modern-day Hyōhō Niten Ichi-ryū employs it as a manual of technique and philosophy.

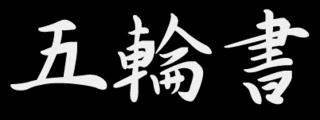
Go Rin no Sho calligraphed in Kanji. Musashi strove to be as great a master in Japanese calligraphy just as much as he did in swordsmanship.

Musashi establishes a "no-nonsense" theme throughout the text. For instance, he repeatedly remarks that technical flourishes are excessive, and contrasts worrying about such things with the principle that all technique is simply a method of cutting down one's opponent. He also continually makes the point that the understandings expressed in the book are important for combat on any scale, whether a one-on-one duel or a massive battle. Descriptions of principles are often followed by admonitions to "investigate this thoroughly" through practice rather than trying to learn them by merely reading.

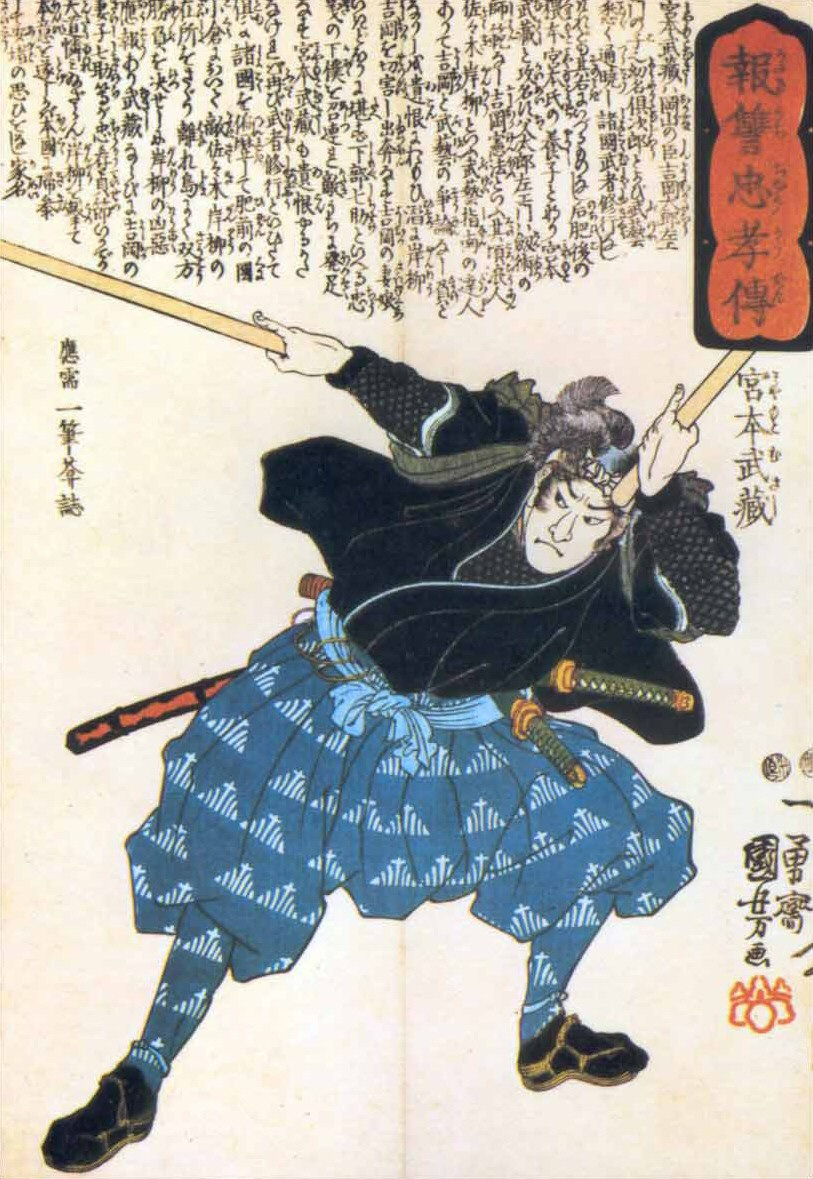
Miyamoto Musashi in his prime, wielding two bokken

Musashi describes and advocates a two-sword fencing style (nitōjutsu): that is, wielding both katana and wakizashi, contrary to the more traditional method of wielding the katana two-handed. However, he only explicitly describes wielding two swords in a section on fighting against many adversaries. The stories of his many duels rarely refer to Musashi himself wielding two swords, although, since they are mostly oral traditions, their details may be inaccurate. Musashi states within the volume that one should train with a long sword in each hand, thereby training the body and improving one's ability to use two blades simultaneously.

== The five books ==

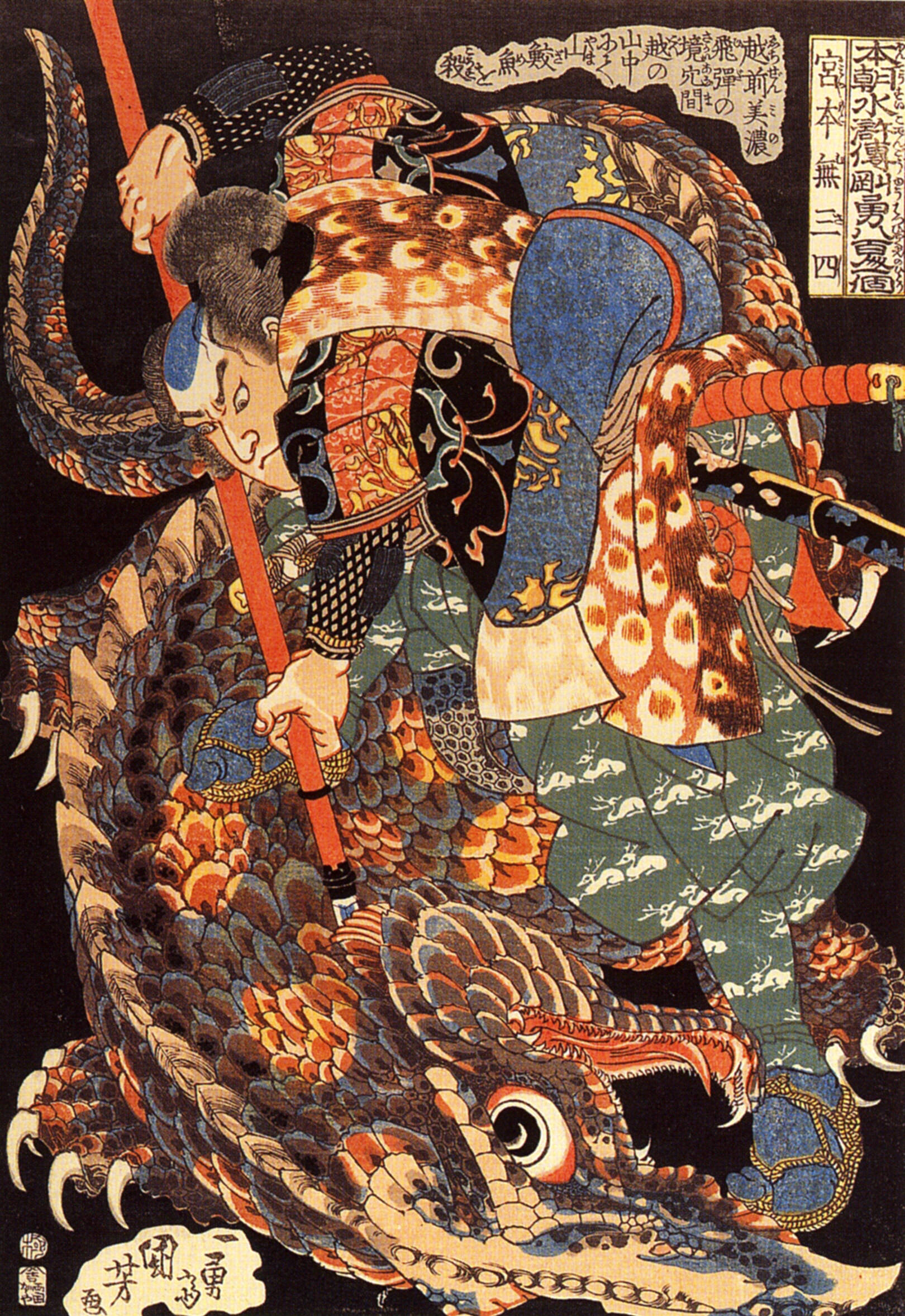
Miyamoto Musashi killing a giant creature, from The Book of Five Rings

Go Rin no Sho are the teachings which Musashi preached to his students in his own dōjō. Though ideas are taken from other sources, the text is predominantly seminal. The five "books" refer to the idea that there are different elements of battle, just as there are different physical elements in life, as described by Buddhism, Shinto, and other Eastern religions. The five books below are Musashi's descriptions of the exact methods or techniques which are described by such elements.

The term Ichi School refers to "Niten No Ichi Ryu" or "Ni-Ten Ichi Ryu", which literally translates to "Two Heavens, One School". Alternative translations include: "Two Swords, One Spirit", and "Two Swords, One Entity". The translation, "Two Swords, One Dragon" was thought to be a misinterpretation of the Kanji word Ryu.

- The Book of Earth chapter serves as an introduction, and metaphorically discusses martial arts, leadership, and training as building a house.
- The Book of Water chapter describes Musashi's style, Ni-ten ichi-ryu, or "Two Heavens, One Style". It describes some basic technique and fundamental principles.
- The Book of Fire chapter refers to the heat of battle, and discusses matters such as different types of timing.
- The Book of Wind chapter is something of a pun, since the Japanese character for "wind" can also mean "style" (such as, of martial arts). It discusses what Musashi considers to be the failings of various contemporary schools of sword fighting.
- The Book of the Void chapter is a short epilogue, describing, in more esoteric terms, Musashi's (probably) Zen-influenced thoughts on consciousness and the correct mindset.

=== The Book of Earth (地の巻) ===
The Earth book, according to Go Rin no Sho, refers expressly to the strategy taught by Musashi at the Ichi School. It is said to be how to distinguish the Way through "Sword-Fencing", or "Swordsmanship". The idea of strategy would be encouraged to be very astute in their study and strategy:

Know the smallest things and the biggest things, the shallowest things and the deepest things. As if it were a straight road mapped out on the ground... These things cannot be explained in detail. From one thing, know ten thousand things. When you attain the Way of Strategy there will not be one thing you cannot see. You must study hard.

Upon their mastery of the strategy and timing listed in the five books, Musashi states that people will be able to defeat ten men as easily as they could defeat one, and asks: "When you have reached this point, will it not mean that you are invincible?"

The strategies listed in this discipline or book relate to situations requiring different weapons and tactics, such as indoor weapons. Musashi states that the use of glaive-like naginata and spears are purely for the field, whereas the longsword and accompanying short-sword can be used in most environments, such as on horseback or in fierce battle.

Musashi also remarks on the gun as having no equal on the battlefield, until swords clash, when it becomes useless. He does note that the gun had the disadvantage of being unable to see a bullet and adjust aim as one would with a bow. He writes: "The bow is tactically strong at the commencement of battle, especially battles on a moor, as it is possible to shoot quickly from among the spearmen. However, it is unsatisfactory in sieges, or when the enemy is more than forty yards away. For this reason there are nowadays few traditional schools of archery. There is little use for this kind of skill."

One of the principles of the Niten Ichi-ryū is that one should be versed in many weaponry skills. Musashi indicates that during battle one should not overuse one weapon—this is as bad as using the weapon poorly, since it becomes easy for an enemy to find a weakness in one's style after countless uses of the same weapon.

Timing, as explained by Musashi, is the core principle in strategy which is listed in Earth. The idea of timing as explained within the book is that one must be able to adapt one's strategy to timing with your skill, in that one must know when to attack and when not to attack.

In The Book of Five Rings he writes on timing:

Timing is important in dancing and pipe or string music, for they are in rhythm only if timing is good. Timing and rhythm are also involved in the military arts, shooting bows and guns, and riding horses. In all skills and abilities there is timing.... There is timing in the whole life of the warrior, in his thriving and declining, in his harmony and discord. Similarly, there is timing in the Way of the merchant, in the rise and fall of capital. All things entail rising and falling timing. You must be able to discern this. In strategy there are various timing considerations. From the outset you must know the applicable timing and the inapplicable timing, and from among the large and small things and the fast and slow timings find the relevant timing, first seeing the distance timing and the background timing. This is the main thing in strategy. It is especially important to know the background timing, otherwise your strategy will become uncertain.

The Book of Earth ends with nine basic principles – the "ground" upon which the samurai must rely. These are "practical" or "worldly," each intended to help develop an understanding of strategy (while the other books focus on tactics and movement). These rules are for his students, and are complemented by the 21 "spiritual principles" for all to follow, which are found in the Dokkōdō (Musashi's final work). The principles are:

1. "Do not think dishonestly."
2. "The Way is in training."
3. "Become acquainted with every art."
4. "Know the Ways of all professions."
5. "Distinguish between gain and loss in worldly matters."
6. "Develop an intuitive judgement and understanding for everything."
7. "Perceive those things which cannot be seen."
8. "Pay attention even to trifles."
9. "Do nothing which is of no use."

=== The Book of Water (水の巻) ===
The water book concerns strategy, spirituality and philosophy. The meaning of water in relation to life is flexibility. Water demonstrates natural flexibility as it changes to conform with the boundaries which contain it, seeking the most efficient and productive path. So also should one possess the ability to change in accordance with one's own situation to easily shift between disciplines, methods, and options when presented with new information. A person should master many aspects of life allowing them to possess both balance and flexibility.

The spiritual bearing in strategy, which Musashi writes about concerns your temperament and spirituality whilst in the midst of, or in formulation of a battle. Being a Buddhist, most of what is written in the section concerning spirituality refers to principles of calmness, tranquility and spiritual balance:

In strategy your spiritual bearing must not be any different from normal. Both in fighting and in everyday life you should be determined though calm.

This balance refers to what could be thought of as yin and yang within one person. The over-familiarity or over-use of one weapon is discouraged by Musashi, as it would be seen to reveal one's spirituality to one's enemy. The idea is that a perfectly balanced spirit is also a perfectly balanced physical presence, and neither creates weakness nor reveals it to an enemy.

During battle, the spirituality and balance is something of which Musashi notes that one should take advantage. Since small people know the spirituality of big people, they can thus note differences and weaknesses between each other. This is something which seems easy, but it is said to change when one is on the battlefield, as then one must know to both adjust one's spiritual balance according to the surrounding environment, and to perceive the balance of others to take advantage accordingly.

Just as one's spirit should be balanced, one's various techniques be honed to a perfectly balanced demeanor. In terms of stance, much like balance within the trooper, Musashi notes that stance is an important part of strategy, or battle: Adopt a stance with the head erect, neither hanging down, nor looking up, nor twisted. This is part of what Musashi notes as wedging in.

In regards to the gaze of someone, he notes that a person must be able to perceive that which is all around him without moving their eyeballs noticeably, which is said to be a skill which takes an enormous amount of practice to perfect. He notes that this is again one of the most important parts of strategy, as well as being able to see things which are close, such as the technique of an enemy. It is also used to perceive things far away, such as arriving troops or enemies, as that is the precursor to battle. One can then change one's actions according to what one sees.

==== Attitudes of swordsmanship ====
1. Upper
2. Middle
3. Lower
4. Right Side
5. Left Side

The five attitudes of swordsmanship are referred to as the five classifications of areas for attack on the human body. These are areas which are noted for their advantages when striking at an enemy, and the strategist is said to think of them when in situations where, for any reason, they should not be able to strike them, and adjust accordingly.

Your attitude should be large or small according to the situation. Upper, Lower and Middle attitudes are decisive. Left Side and Right Side attitudes are fluid. Left and Right attitudes should be used if there is an obstruction overhead or to one side. The decision to use Left or Right depends on the place.

As each is thought of as an attitude, it could be thought of that Musashi means to practice with each "attitude" so that you do not become over-reliant upon one, something which Musashi repeatedly notes as being worse than bad technique.

"No Attitude" refers to those strategists who do not go with the use of the "Five Attitudes" and prefer to simply go without the attitudes of the long sword to focus entirely on technique, as opposed to focusing on both technique and the five attitudes. This is similar to taking chances as opposed to making chances.

The attitude of "Existing – Non Existing", mixes the Five Attitudes with the Attitude of "No Attitude", meaning that the user of the longsword uses the techniques and principles of both at whichever moment is most opportune.

"In-One Timing" refers to the technique of biding one's time until a suitable gap can be found in the enemies' defense, to which one will deliver one fatal blow to the enemy. Although this is said to be difficult, Musashi notes that masters of this technique are usually masters of the five attitudes because they must be perceptive of weaknesses. It is rumored that Musashi disgraced a former sword master by using such a technique with a bokken, but there are no descriptions mentioning "In one" timing.

"Abdomen Timing of Two" refers to feinting an attack, then striking an enemy as they are retreating from the attack, hitting them in the abdomen with the correct timing of either two moves or two seconds. Although the technique seems relatively simple, Musashi lists this as one of the hardest techniques to time correctly.

"No Design, No Conception" refers to When word and actions are spontaneously the same. Aside from this philosophical approach to the meaning, the technique is relatively simple to explain: if you are in a deadlock with the enemy, using the force from the cut, you push with your body and use the disciplines outlined in the Void Book to knock the enemy over.

This is the most important method of hitting. It is often used. You must train hard to understand it.

"Flowing Water Cut" technique is relevant to a fight with an enemy of a similar level in swordsmanship. When attacking fast, Musashi notes that one will always be at stalemate, so like stagnant water, one must cut as slowly as possible with the long sword. At the beginning of this technique, both combatants will be searching for an opening within each other's defense. When the opponent either tries to push off the sword, or to hasten back as to disengage it, you must first expand your whole body and your mind. By moving your body first and then that of your sword, you will be able to strike powerfully and broadly with a movement that seems to reflect the natural flow of water. Ease and confidence will be attained when this technique is continuously practiced upon.

"Continuous Cut" refers to when you are again faced with stalemate within a duel, where your swords are clasped together. In one motion, when your sword springs away from theirs, Musashi says to use a continuous motion to slash their head, body, and legs.

"Fire and Stone's Cut" refers to when swords clash together. Without raising the sword, cut as strongly as possible. This means cutting quickly with hands, body, and legs.

"Red Leaves Cut" refers to knocking down the enemy's long sword in the spirit of the "No Design, No Conception" cut.

=== The Book of Fire (火の巻) ===
The Fire Book refers to fighting methods unlike the specific fighting techniques listed in the Water Book. It goes into a broader scope in terms of hints as to assess a situation, as well as specific situational instructions.

He notes obvious advantages of armor and preparedness before a duel or battle as it applies to one man or a whole group of men:

As one man can defeat ten men, so can one thousand men defeat ten thousand. However, you can become a master of strategy by training alone with a sword, so that you can understand the enemy's stratagems, his strength and resources, and come to appreciate how to apply strategy to beat ten thousand enemies.

The dependence of location according to the Go Rin no Sho is crucial. You must be in a place where man-made objects such as buildings, towers, castles, and such do not obstruct your view, as well as facing or standing in a position where the sun or moon does not affect your vision. This is purely so that your vision is focused on nothing but the enemy, and thus there is more concentration upon the enemy's stratagems. Musashi also seems to note the age old strategy of the High Ground:

You must look down on the enemy, and take up your attitude on slightly higher places.

Other kinds of tactics which of Musashi tells are way of ensuring that the enemy is at a disadvantage. Forcing yourself on the non-dominant side of a trooper is one way because the left side is difficult for a right-handed soldier. Other disadvantages, such as forcing enemies into footholds, swamps, ditches, and other difficult terrain, force the enemy to be uncertain of his situation.

These things cannot be clearly explained in words. You must research what is written here. In these three ways of forestalling, you must judge the situation. This does not mean that you always attack first; but if the enemy attacks first you can lead him around. In strategy, you have effectively won when you forestall the enemy, so you must train well to attain this.

Ken No Sen (Attacking) is the most obvious method of forestalling an enemy because a head-on collision forces both parties to a standstill. Although it is not mentioned, Musashi must have been well aware that this method would also be the most likely to have a higher death count than the others due to the sheer mass of enemies because more than one enemy could then attack a single soldier or trooper.

As the name suggests, Tai No Sen (Waiting for the Initiative) is invented for very opportunistic and decided battles between parties. The main idea being to feign weakness as to open a weak spot, or Achilles' heel, in the opposing force, and then regrouping to exploit such a hole by attacking deep within the enemy's party. Although it is not mentioned, this would most likely be to kill the officer of the highest rank as an attempt to remove the tactical centre of a group of soldiers. A method particularly useful for Musashi or others, if attacking a general directly would signal the end of the battle upon his defeat.

Only a small amount of text is written about Tai Tai No Sen (Accompanying and Forestalling). Albeit very confusing, the idea of Tai Tai No Sen is circumventing an ambush or quick attack from the enemy by taking the initiative and attacking in full force. Musashi admits himself that this is a difficult thing to explain.

Although there are other methods, they are mostly situational methods relating to the crossing of rough terrain, and battling within such rough terrain. Although it spreads over two or more paragraphs, most information is common sense, relating to caution and avoidance of such situations.

The idea of timing, as with singular battles, is known as the most important part of attacking next to the skill of participants. However, the type of timing in this instance is somewhat different from the timing noted in The Ground Book since this variety of timing requires looking at the various physical factors which affect an enemy during battle, such as determining if strength is waning or rising within a group of troopers.

The idea of treading down the sword is a very simple technique. Squashing an enemy's attack before it starts by using a form of charging and then attacking under the veil of gunpowder smoke, and arrow fire, the initial attacks used when starting battles can be highly effective. Individually, it refers to attacking the enemy's sword, breaking it, removing it from play, and a technique of controlling it through direct blade on blade contact.

Just as Musashi mentions in his philosophical style, there is a cause for a collapse. As there is collapse within an enemy, such as waning in his numbers, Musashi notes that one must observe such events and use them to advantage.

He notes that an enemy's formation can fall if they lose rhythm. It was known that in such battles, drummers drummed a tune for their other fellow soldiers to march to; and, if the rhythm was lost, it led to a "collapse when their rhythm becomes deranged".

=== The Book of Wind (風の巻) ===
Whereas most of the information given in the previous books is useful in such a way that it could still be applicable today, this book is primarily concerned with the specific details about other strategies that existed at the time. The broader lesson from this book is that an important part of understanding one's own way is to understand the way of one's opponent as precisely as possible.

Musashi notes that although most schools have secret and ancient strategies, most forms are derivative of other martial arts. Their similarities and differences evolved through situational factors, such as indoor or outdoor dueling, and the style adapted to the school. He indicates that his appraisal may be one sided because the only school he had interest for was his own, and, in a way, he does not see parallels to his own creation and work. However, he still admits that without basic understanding of these alternate techniques, one will not be able to learn Ni Ten Ichi Ryu, probably for reasons of finding the wrongs in other techniques, and righting them within yourself in Ni Ten Ichi Ryu.

The main difference that Musashi notes between the Ichi School and other strategists and schools is that other schools do not teach the "broader" meaning of strategy. There is a strategy above sword-fencing: "Some of the world's strategists are concerned only with sword-fencing, and limit their training to flourishing the long sword and carriage of the body." The book has many paragraphs on the subject of other schools' techniques, and much of the text lists the ways that other schools do not conform to the ideals which he himself writes about in the Book of Five Rings, such as footwork, sight, and over-reliance or over-familiarity with a weapon.

=== The Book of Void (空の巻) ===
Although short, the void book lists, philosophically, the nature of both human knowledge and other things. The void book expressly deals with "That which cannot be seen".

By knowing things that exist, you can know that which does not exist.

The Book of Nothing, according to Musashi, is the true meaning of the strategy of Ni Ten Ichi Ryu. It seems very esoteric in nature because he emphasizes that people must learn to perceive that which they cannot understand or comprehend. He notes that in this Void, what can be comprehended are things which we do and see, such as the way of the warrior, martial arts, and Ni Ten Ichi Ryu. At the same time, in the Void, things we do not do or see (which he calls Spirit) are part of the information which we perceive on a conscious level, but with which we have no physical relationship. It is arguable whether Musashi is referring to religious spirituality or if he is actually explaining a way to live a life and to process thoughts.

In the void is virtue, and no evil. Wisdom has existence, principle has existence, the Way has existence, spirit is nothingness.

In the above quote, Musashi speaks of "virtue and no evil". This may mean "goodness and banishment of evil" or "purpose and non-existence of good and evil", and the exact meaning is open to debate.

Since Musashi is drawing upon classical Buddhist Five Element theory, Void in this case refers to Sunyata (in Pali), sometimes translated as "Emptiness", or "ether". Void, as such, is also empty of the sense of self (anatta), good and evil, wanting and non-wanting, and is the spiritual dynamic that forms the jumping off point to satori, enlightenment. Emptiness, and the establishing of the conditions that allow it to arise, is a common theme in Zen Buddhist meditation practice, which informed the perspective of the author.

== See also ==
- Arthashastra
- Bansenshūkai
- Dokkōdō
- Epitoma rei militaris (Publius Flavius Vegetius Renatus)
- Ganbaru
- Godai
- Gosho Motoharu
- Hagakure
- Legend of the Five Rings
- List of military writers
- Miyamoto Musashi Station
- On War
- Philosophy of war
- Records of the Grand Historian
- The 33 Strategies of War
- The Art of War (de Jomini)
- The Art of War (Machiavelli)
- The Book of Feats of Arms and of Chivalry (Christine de Pizan)
- Yagyū Munenori

== References and further reading ==
- De Lange, William (2014). Miyamoto Musashi: A Life in Arms. Floating World Editions. ISBN 978-1-891640-629.
- De Lange, William (2010). The Real Musashi: The Bushu denraiki. Floating World Editions. ISBN 978-1-891640-56-8.
- De Lange, William (2011). The Real Musashi: The Bukoden. Floating World Editions. ISBN 978-1-891640-60-5.
- De Lange, William (2016). The Real Musashi: A Miscellany. Floating World Editions. ISBN 978-1-891640-86-5.
- Moore, JS (2014). Under the Sun: The Miyamoto Musashi Story. Understanding Apples Press. ISBN 978-1-5028-0491-4.
- Tokitsu, Kenji (2004). Miyamoto Musashi: His Life and Writings. Shambhala Publications, Inc. ISBN 978-1-59030-045-9.
- Miyamoto, Musashi (1974). A Book of Five Rings, translated by Victor Harris. London: Allison & Busby; Woodstock, New York: The Overlook Press.
- Tokitsu, Kenji (2004). Miyamoto Musashi: His Life and Writings. Boston: Shambhala Publications Inc.

The Book of Five Rings has been published in English multiple times. The Thomas Cleary translation is the most widely available and has been reprinted multiple times. A translation by William Scott Wilson is aimed towards practitioners of Japanese classical swordsmanship. A translation by D. E. Tarver is marketed as a motivational book with a commercial bias. Additional published translators include Stephen F. Kaufman and Kenji Tokistu (2010).

- Miyamoto Musashi (translator Thomas Cleary), The Book of Five Rings: A Classic Text on the Japanese Way of the Sword, 2005, Boston: Shambhala Publications. ISBN 978-1-59030-248-4.
- The Book of Five Rings: a graphic novel, by manga writer Sean Michael Wilson and Japanese artist Chie Kutsuwada, 2012, Shambhala Publications, Boston, USA. A graphic novel based on the translations of William Scott Wilson.ISBN 978-1611800128.
- Miyamoto Musashi (translator Alexander Bennett), The Complete Musashi: The Book of Five Rings and Other Works, 2018, Tokyo: Tuttle Publishing. ISBN 978-4805316160.
