= Niten Ichi-ryū =

Japanese school of swordsmanship

Traditional Japanese martial art
Hyōhō Niten Ichi-ryū
Founder(s)
Miyamoto Musashi (宮本 武蔵	1584–1645
Date founded
Early Edo period	Founded between 1604–1640
Current headmaster
Kajiya Takanori: 12th generation (after Iwami Toshio Genshin)

Arts taught
Japanese name	Description	Niten Ichi-ryu designation
Kenjutsu 剣術—odachi, kodachi	Sword art—Long and short sword	Tachi/Kodachi Seiho
Kenjutsu—odachi, kodachi	Sword art—Long and short sword used together	Nito Seiho
Aikuchi		Aikuchi roppo
Juttejutsu—Jutte	Truncheon art	Jitte to jutsu
Bōjutsu棒術—Bō	Staff art	Bo jutsu
Jōdō	Staff art	Jo jutsu

Hyōhō Niten Ichi-ryū (兵法 二天 一流), which can be loosely translated as "the school of the strategy of two heavens as one", is a koryū (ancient school), transmitting a style of classical Japanese swordsmanship conceived by Miyamoto Musashi. Hyōhō Niten Ichi-ryū is mainly known for the two-sword—katana and wakizashi—kenjutsu techniques Musashi called Niten Ichi (二天一, "two heavens as one") or Nitō Ichi (二刀一, "two swords as one").

== Origin ==
Musashi originally studied Enmei Ryū and Tōri Ryū, which were ryūha founded by his grandfather Miyamoto Musashi no Kami Yoshimoto and his father Miyamoto Muninosuke respectively. Musashi eventually focused in the kenjutsu and nitōken and developed his own style.

Around 1640, Musashi intended to pass on his art to three successors from among his thousand students; specifically, to Terao Magonojo, his younger brother Kyumanosuke and to Furuhashi Sozaemon. He considered Magonojo to excel in technique but to lack in reflection, while Furuhashi excelled at reflection but lacked technique. Magonojo received the treatise, the Go Rin no Sho. Hosokawa Mitsuhisa made two copies—one for Furuhashi and one for himself, which he transmitted under the name of Ihon go rin no sho. The best known edition today is this Hosokawa copy. Kyumanosuke was a well known warrior and student of Musashi's at the time. Before becoming leader of the school, he fought in the Shimabara Rebellion in 1638. His service there earned him gold and a robe from the Tokugawa shogunate.

Magonojo died in 1645 and yielded the role of successor to his younger brother Kyumanosuke who had received the Hyoho San-jugo from Musashi. It was Kyumanosuke who transmitted this document to his students with seven added instructions called the Hyoho shiji ni kajo.

Shortly before his death, Musashi also wrote the Dokkodo ("Going My Way"). It seems to be a list of rules that one should try to follow in life steeped in Buddhist precepts.

== Philosophy and Strategy ==
The Hyōhō Niten Ichi-ryū is more than just a technical school of swordsmanship—it is deeply rooted in Musashi's strategic and philosophical principles, many of which are outlined in The Book of Five Rings (Go Rin no Sho). Musashi emphasized the importance of adaptability, cadence, and perception in combat, believing that a true martial artist should not be bound by a single weapon or style but should instead be fluid and versatile.

One of the core principles of Niten Ichi-ryū is "ken no sen" (initiative with the sword), which means taking the offensive and controlling the fight from the outset. Musashi believed that passivity in battle leads to failure, and thus his techniques encourage continuous movement and proactive strikes to unbalance opponents. This philosophy is particularly evident in the Niten Ichi two-sword strategy, which allows practitioners to control both distance and tempo by engaging with the katana and wakizashi simultaneously.

Another fundamental concept in Musashi’s strategy is "heiho no michi" (the way of strategy), which extends beyond martial arts and applies to all aspects of life, including leadership, business, and personal growth. He advocated for "seeing things as they truly are", urging practitioners to develop an unbiased perception of reality rather than being distracted by appearances. This concept is reflected in the training methods of Niten Ichi-ryū, where students practice various weapons and scenarios to cultivate mental flexibility and quick decision-making.

Even today, the teachings of Hyōhō Niten Ichi-ryū continue to influence martial artists and strategists worldwide. Its emphasis on adaptability and tactical awareness makes it a martial art not just for combat but for strategic thinking in all walks of life.

== Branches and lineage ==
Over the centuries, Hyōhō Niten Ichi-ryū has been transmitted through multiple lines, some diverging due to geographic separation, teaching priorities, or succession disputes. Today, several lineages are recognized to varying degrees by official Japanese martial arts organizations.

=== Seito (Main Line / Santō-ha) ===
The Seito (main) line traces directly from founder Miyamoto Musashi through successive headmasters: Terao Kyūmanosuke, Terao Goemon, Yoshida Josetsu, Santō Hikozaemon, Santō Hanbē, Santō Shinjūrō, Aoki Kikuo, and into modern times. Following Aoki, succession passed to Imai Masayuki; after his retirement, Iwami Toshio became 11th sōke. In 2013, Kajiya Takanori succeeded Iwami Toshio as the 12th sōke.

=== Noda-ha ===
The Noda-ha lineage branched from the main line during the third generation and has been transmitted independently. It is particularly noted for preserving the Gohō-no-tachi (“Five Two-Sword Forms”).

=== Gosho-ha ===
Gosho Motoharu, a menkyo kaiden holder under Aoki Kikuo, was appointed shihan and adjunct successor in the mid-20th century. In 2004, Gosho-ha Hyōhō Niten Ichi-ryū was formally established to preserve traditional continuity. In 2007, Yoshimoti Kiyoshi—Gosho’s son—was recognized as the 12th successor in the Seito line.

After Kiyonaga’s death in 1976, the Kiyonaga family asked Gosho Motoharu to train Imai Masayuke so that he could assume the 10th generation, upon the understanding that Kiyonaga Fumiya would later succeed as 11th. In this account, legitimacy rested on the authority recognized at the time and on the commitment attached to that arrangement with the Kiyonaga family.

Gosho Motoharu remained the principal custodian of the school’s technical transmission, preserving the forms associated with Aoki Kikuo and the earlier Santō-ha line. Gosho-ha was therefore presented by its supporters as the continuation of an older current within Hyōhō Niten Ichi-ryū, maintained under the authority of those originally responsible for the line’s transmission, rather than as a new interpretation. Later, after Kiyonaga Fumiya’s death, the Kiyonaga family itself reestablished the lineage through Yoshimochi Kiyoshi, later continuing through Ishii Toyozumi.

=== Miyagawa-ha ===
The Miyagawa-ha branch of Hyōhō Niten Ichi-ryū was established by Miyagawa Yasutaka, who was designated as a co-equal 9th sōke (headmaster) along with Kiyonaga Tadanao by Aoki Kikuo Hisakatsu, the 8th sōke of the system. The lineage is currently carried on by the 10th headmaster Miyagawa Morito, son of Yasutaka. While the Miyagawa‑ha line is rooted in the Kansai region of Japan, it also enjoys active branches in both the United States and Spain.

=== Other lineages ===
Other named schools include Hosokawa-ke (Miyata Kazuhiro). which has a branch in Brazil.

=== Recognition and status ===
- The Nihon Kobudō Kyōkai and Nihon Kobudō Shinkōkai recognize the Seito line as the legitimate heir of Musashi’s tradition.
- Noda-ha is also formally acknowledged for safeguarding the Gohō-no-kata.
- Gosho-ha and other branches remain active, though their formal recognition varies by region and organization.

== Curriculum ==
The official curriculum of Hyōhō Niten Ichi-ryū, as maintained by the Hombu Dōjō under the current headmaster Kajiya Takanori, consists of four core kata sets:

=== Tachi Seiho (太刀勢法) – Long Sword Forms ===
A set of twelve paired kata using the tachi (long sword):

- 指先 – Sassen
- 八相左 – Hassō Hidari
- 八相右 – Hassō Migi
- 受流左 – Uke-nagashi Hidari
- 受流右 – Uke-nagashi Migi
- 捩構 – Mojigamae
- 張付 – Haritsuke
- 流打 – Nagashi-uchi
- 虎振 – Tora-buri
- 数喜 – Kazuki
- 合先打留 – Aisen-uchidome
- 余打 – Amashi-uchi

=== Kodachi Seiho (小太刀勢法) – Short Sword Forms ===
A set of seven paired kata with the kodachi (short sword):

- 指先 – Sassen
- 中段 – Chūdan
- 受流 – Uke-nagashi
- 捩構 – Mojigamae
- 張付 – Haritsuke
- 流打 – Nagashi-uchi
- 合先 – Aisen

=== Nitō Seiho (二刀勢法) – Two-Sword Forms ===
Five forms using the long and short swords simultaneously, aligned conceptually with the Water Scroll of the Gorin no Sho:

- 中段 – Chūdan
- 上段 – Jōdan
- 下段 – Gedan
- 左脇構 – Hidari-waki-gamae
- 右脇構 – Migi-waki-gamae

=== Bōjutsu (棒術) – Staff Forms ===
Twenty techniques using the long staff (bō), including both bō-versus-bō and bō-versus-sword scenarios.

These kata express the practical and philosophical strategies of Miyamoto Musashi, many of which are elaborated in his treatise Gorin no Sho (Book of Five Rings).
