= Flexible defense =

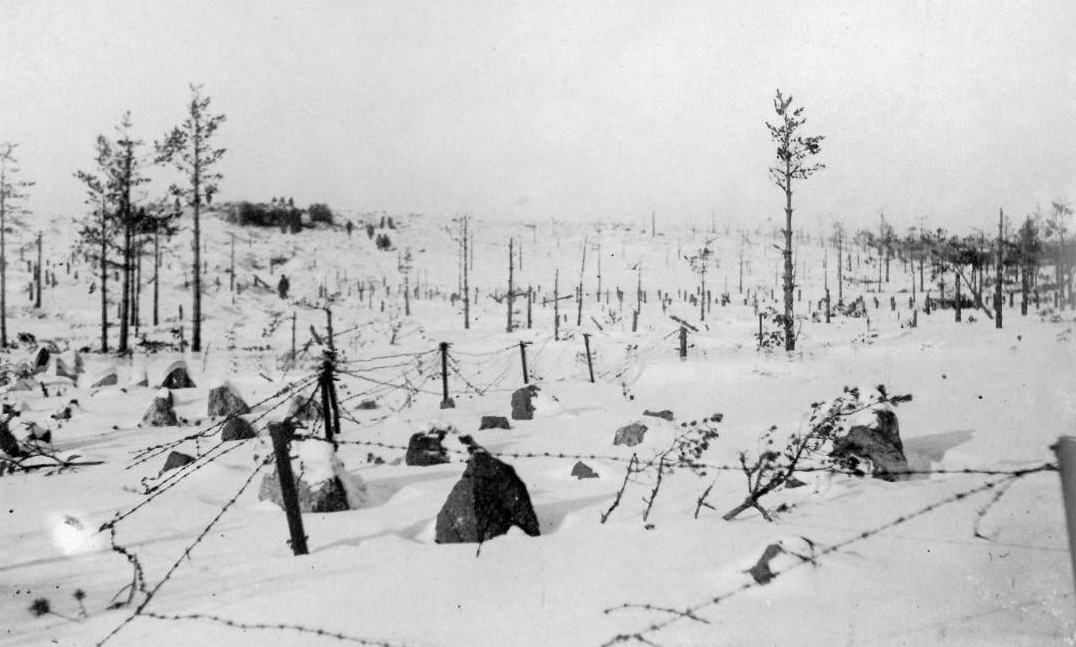
A section of the Mannerheim Line

The flexible defense is a military theory about the design of modern fortifications. The examples of "flexible" defense-lines (Mannerheim Line, Árpád Line, Bar Lev Line) are not based on dense lines of heavily armed, large and expensive concrete fortifications as the systems such as the Maginot Line were. Their protective capacity hinges on multiple lines of obstacles and small shelters fitting into the environment. They are "flexible" because soldiers are not locked in pillboxes, but fight instead in easily replaceable open earth-wood made positions, while bunkers serve only as shelters during bombardments. As a result, they are able to adapt to the opponent's movements, and there are no easily targeted large buildings in these lines.

== Theoretical background ==
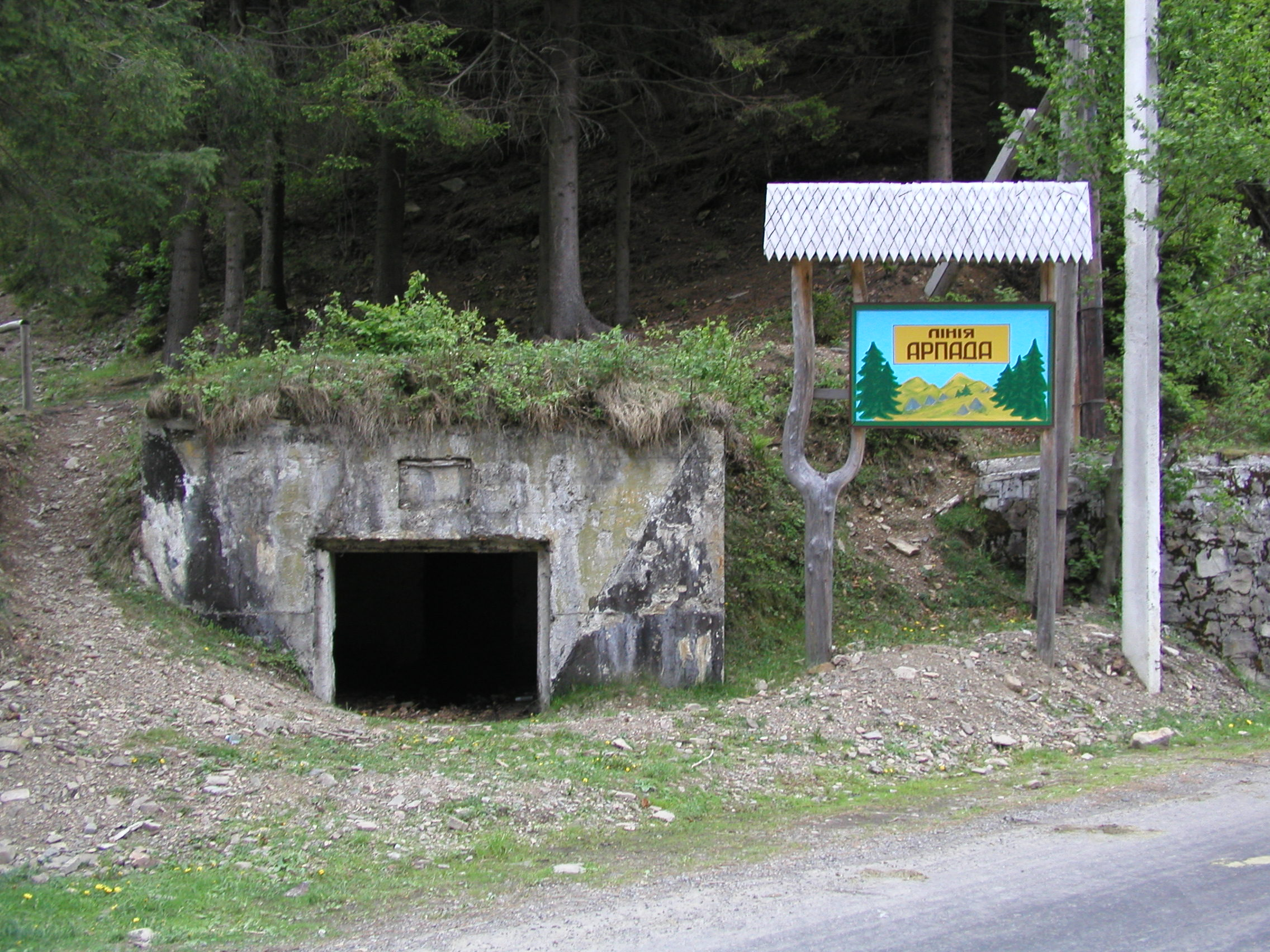
Bunker in the northern part of Árpád Line

The methodology was first used by the Finnish military in the Mannerheim line, but had been drawn up in detail by General Teofil Hárosy, the Hungarian pioneer, in 1939–1940. The protective capacity would be provided by multiple lines of well-designed obstacles fitting into the environment and relief rather than bunkers. Every road passable by tanks and trucks was closed by hurdles, but the intermediate areas were unprotected. Ergo the hostile infantry and cavalry could surpass the fortified line, but every battlegroup without resupply quickly run out of ammo and food, after which a much smaller friendly mobile force could beat them. Thus the flexible line based on small, circularly defensible fortified zones and small but rapid pursuer troops, rather than a continuous impenetrable fortress-line. Most of the roads has been destroyed in forested, mountainous or swampy areas between forts. Therefore, the main task of defenders was to protect the obstacles, and not fight with the main attacking forces.

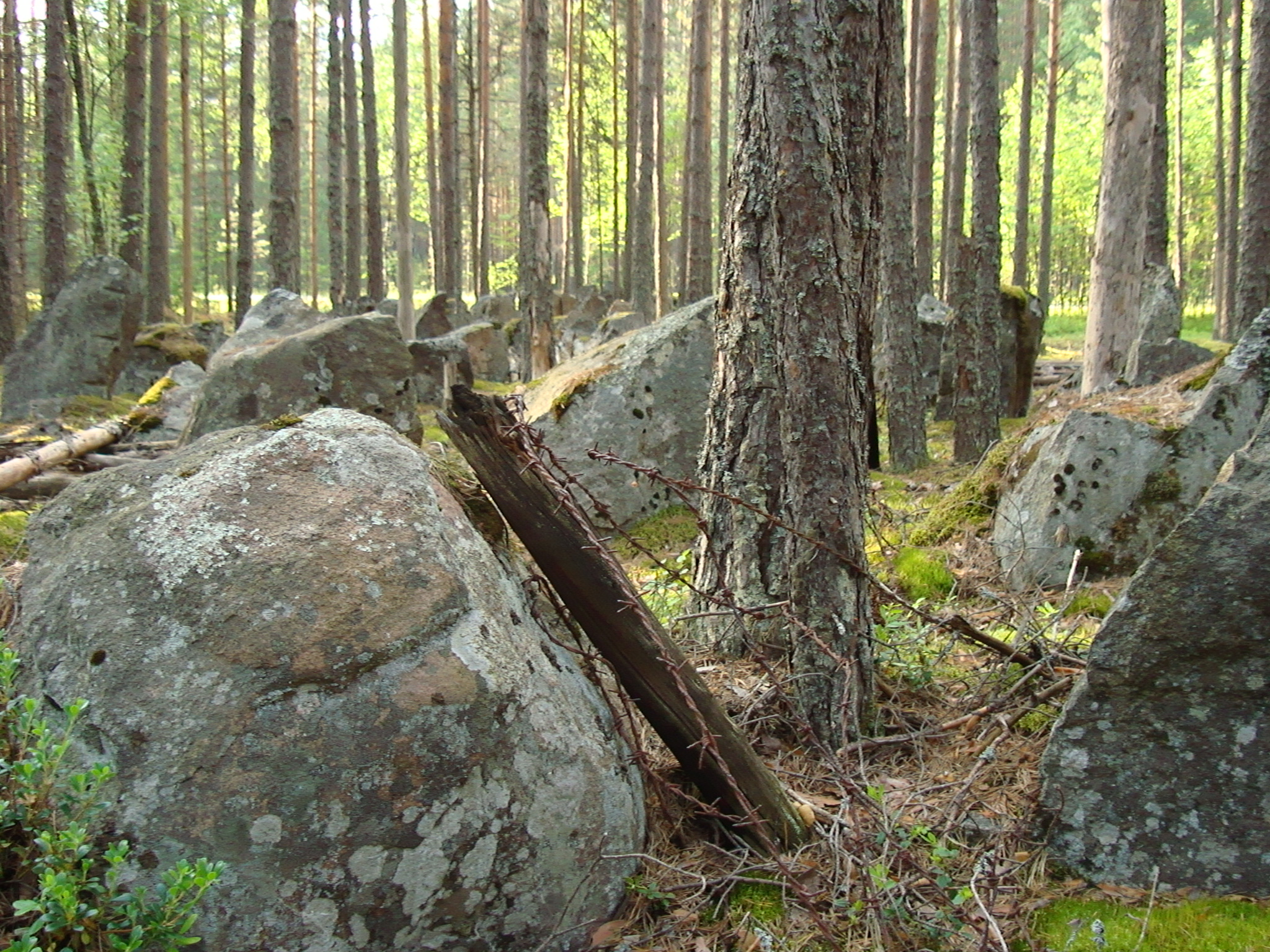
Anti-tank obstacle in wood, Mannerheim Line

The main manner of this type of field fortification was to close potential vehicular transport and attack routes with multiplied anti-tank ditches, hedgehogs, dragon's teeth and mine fields. These obstacle-zone are followed by a quite small but peculiarly complex system of ditches and barbed wire obstacles, which protects the anti-tank barrier against sappers, bridge-layer tanks and engineer teams. The semi-mobile engagement is the main point, soldiers fight in open firing positions, while bunkers served as only shelters during bombardments. Thus it is possible to quickly reallocate between the points of defense (manpower not locked in pillboxes), and counterattacks feasible by defense force. The main defense line usually lies at hilltop on the edge of a forest, divided into circularly defensible independent subsectors (platoon size) which allow a full 360° arc of fire. A sector includes 3 (or more) trench-rings and no more than a few ferro-concrete shelters surrounded by a wide zone of anti-personnel obstacles and 2 (or more) V- or U-shaped anti-tank trenches or dragon's teeth. 3-4 independent sectors connect by communication trenches into a defensive zone or fortress (company or battalion size).

Damage caused by enemy's attacks on non-concrete elements of the line is easily repairable while main forces carry out short counterattacks. Therefore, it is not just a passive defense, but is also based on (and its method dependent upon) common counterattacks and infiltrator assaults. The flexibility of the line also means it is designed to help execution of offensive operations as rearguard and provide fire support to moving friendly groups. The necessary infrastructure elements have been built and multiple small rapid units were available (skier, rider and cyclist groups mainly) with strength from platoon to company size.

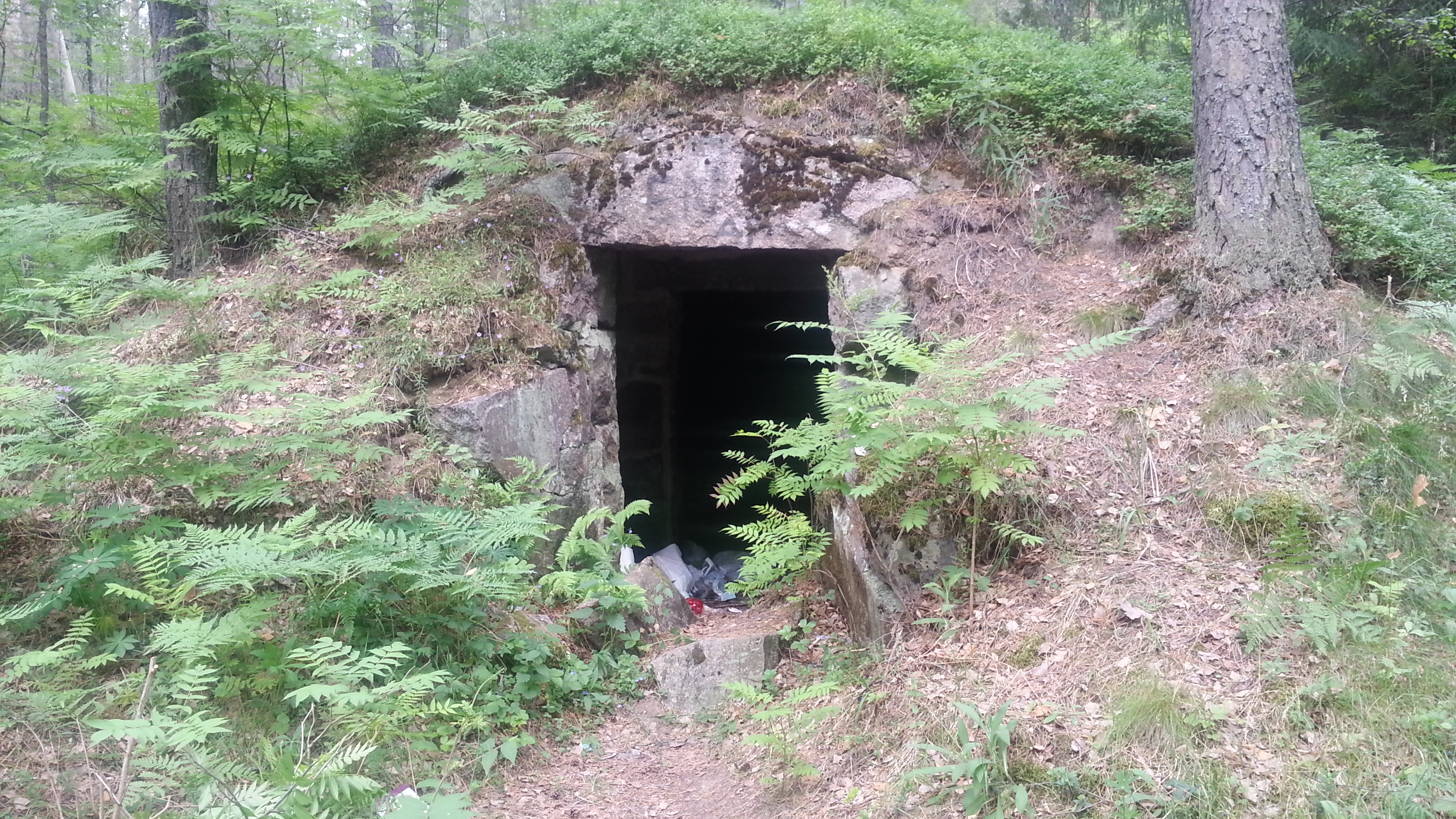
Camouflaged bunker, Mannerheim Line

Unlike the Maginot, Metaxas and Siegfried-type lines, the overall barrier and trench system of flexible defense lines were hard to detect. Ideally, defensive positions are in enfilade or reverse slope defence positions to avoid enemy's direct fire. It was a complex net of small objects, all of them entirely adapted to the natural topography (e.g.: natural steep slopes as anti-tank wall, trenches curving as isolines). All buildings, dugouts and obstacles are adapted to the landscape and objects (fallen trees, rocks, mounds and bushes), and there are no easily targeted large objects, while Maginot-like bunkers were impossible to be camouflaged enough. Concrete MG and Gun pillboxes in the Mannerheim and Árpád lines were particularly well camouflaged, and almost all of them have enfilading field of fire (mostly enfilade-defilade combination) in order to defend anti-tank obstacles against sappers, thus none of them fires direct toward enemy's lines. Because these buildings were not exposed to the enemy's line-of-sight artillery they could have been made much thinner than the Maginot-type ones therefore vastly less installation of concrete is required per kilometer compared to other lines.

Therefore, the enemy is forced to attack the defensive trenches with conventional infantry assault (as during World War I) at the cost of terrible losses, without assistance of armored forces or line-of-sight firing guns. Because of the possibility of redeployment, significantly less manpower is required than the Maginot-like defenses. The semi-mobile engagement is also more psychologically preferable than the claustrophobic feeling of Maginot-like bunkers in the long term. This type of defensive line required 5-10 times less manpower and concrete per kilometer than the Maginot or Siegfried line with equal (or more) effectiveness, but far more imagination was required from the builders because every part of the line had an inevitably unique design adapted to local conditions.

== Comparison to conventional fortresses ==
Hungarian VKF-7/m commission (Headquarters of Fortifications) investigated events of the three current wars (Spanish Civil War, Finnish Winter War and World War II) in 1940. In addition to secondary analyses they carried out field research in the sites of previous battles (e.g. the Maginot line). According to their results the main differences between static and flexible lines could be summarized in the following points:

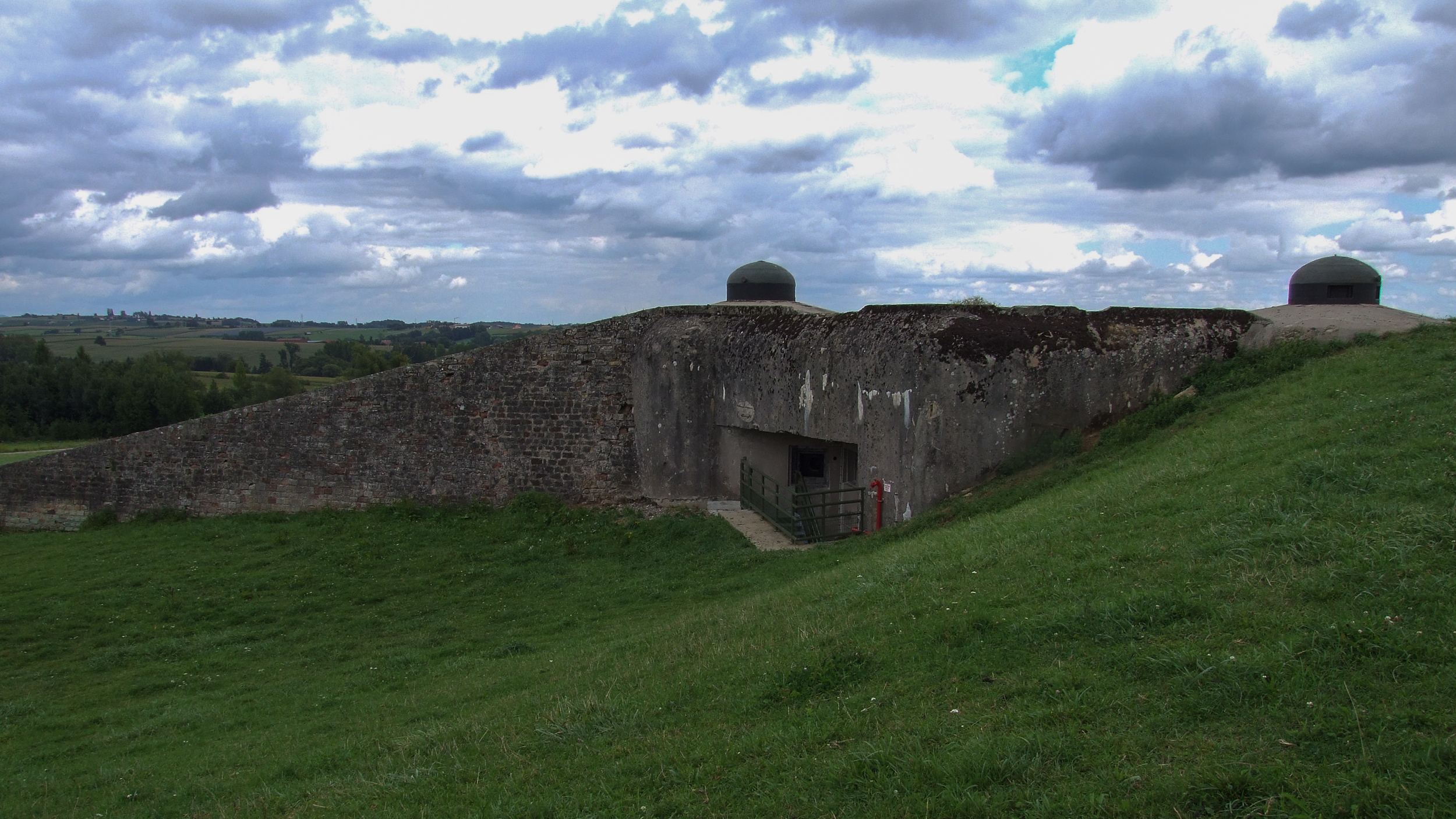
- Fortress on the Maginot line. It is huge, expensive, identifiable from afar and contains vulnerable items.
  Maginot, Siegfried and Metaxas-like (later Atlantic Wall too) bunkers have lot of weaknesses. The modern and accurate guns, snipers and autocannons can hit small loopholes. Air inlets and most of loopholes were destructible by small groups of combat engineers. The Germans did not perform frontal assaults, they attacked the vulnerable entrances of the well-equipped fortresses with paratroopers and special units. At Sedan, a German sapper group was able to break through the massive and costly main defense within only 41 minutes. Pillboxes were too big (camouflage and costs), and could be blinded by small concentrated smoke screens. Conversely, the Mannerheim line proved that flexible defense lines are immune to a few sappers or small smoke screens, since they do not contain large objects.
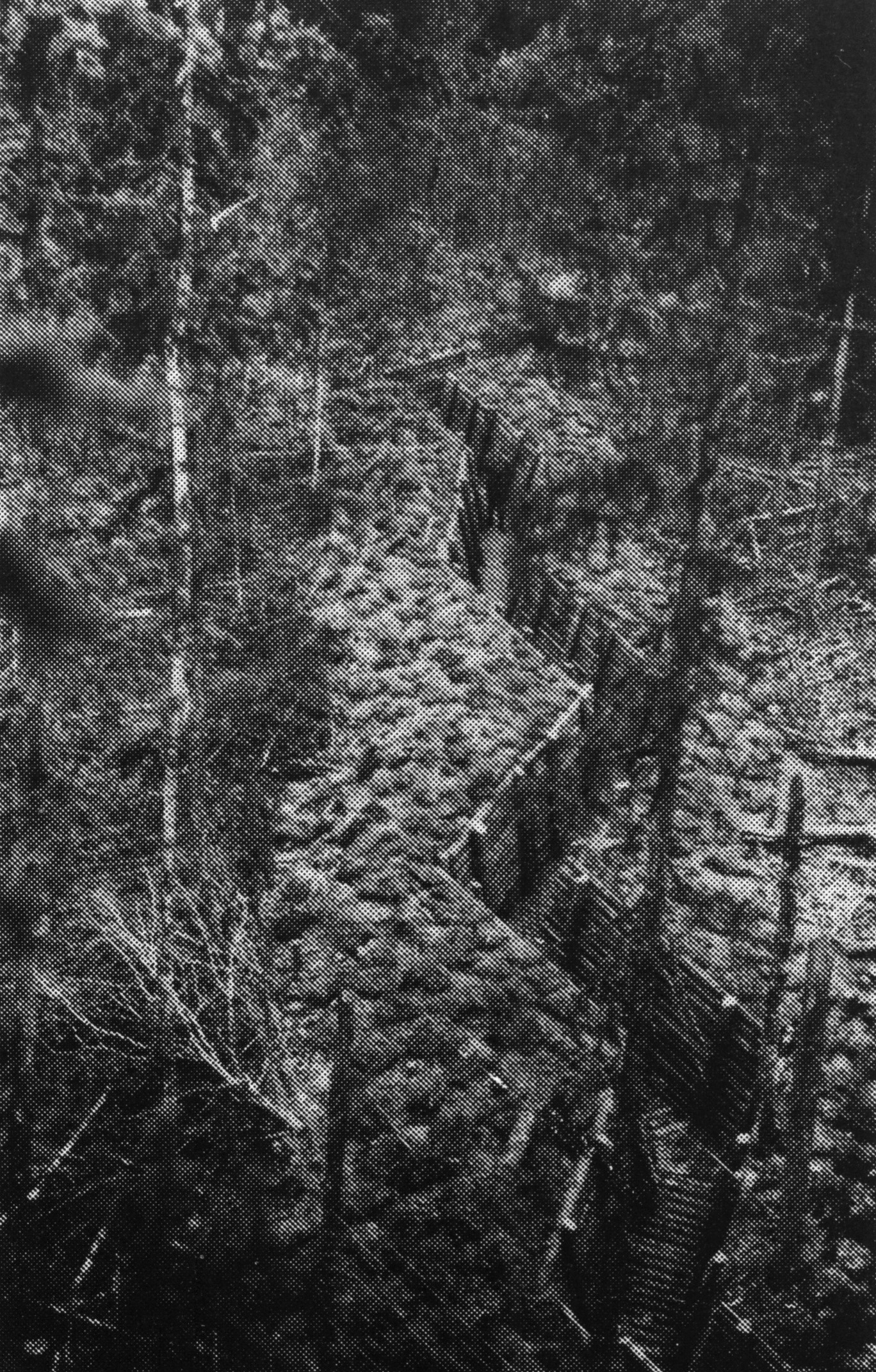
- Camouflaged trench in Finland
  Trench warfare is highly beneficial to the defender if the enemy could not use tanks and line-of-sight artillery. Thus flexible defense puts firepower into defensive fighting positions such as trenches, saps, firebays and earth-wooden made pillboxes. This was an advantage because since it was less extensive it formed a less obvious target for enemy force to be directed against. Thus, the task of defense force is to protect anti-tank obstacles against hostile sappers in order to coerce enemy to attack trenches with conventional infantry attack. In ideal case the entrenched defense can successfully facing with enemy up to ten times numerical superiority.
- The Maginot line required a large number of fixed anti-tank artillery, which was easily disrupted by artillery shelling or smoke screens. Flexible lines use mixed natural and artificial anti-tank obstacles; tanks and other armored vehicles could not get through these well-planned defense lines on their own, especially if the design take advantage of the natural relief and objects. The most effective protection provided by double or triple U trenches on hillsides, because enemy's artillery can not destroy an indentation. Armored troops can only get through this line with AVLBs or extensive engineering operations, which is relatively easy to counteract.
- Conventional fortresses are proved to be too stationary in the time of Blitzkrieg mechanized warfare. The soldiers locked in bunkers, thus they are not easily regroupable, therefore full-scale defense force must be available at every point of Line. In contrast, flexible defense make it possible to carry out to move and regroup own troops, quick switch between open firing positions and launch counter-attacks. For this reason, the entire system could be operated by much smaller manpower what could be concentrated on attacked locations. Thereby even in a smaller army remain sufficiently enough free manpower to organize mobile corps.
- The diffuse objects of flexible lines are easily concealable, thus small and inexpensive bunkers are sufficient opposed to the Maginot-type bunkers with several meters thick walls. Even 5-10 times less concrete could be enough per kilometers if bunkers are not involved in direct firefight. However particularly effective camouflage is required, by reason of hiding and disguise provide protection against hostile heavy artillery and air force. It is important to emphasize quickly reachable shelters need to be built next to each fire point in case of sudden bombardments.
- The main drawback of Flexible Defence is that these lines are effective only when they lie next to natural barriers. In addition to man-made obstacles Bar Lev Line and Mannerheim Line used water bodies (Suez Canal, numerous lakes) and Árpád line adopted escarpments and benches as anti-tank blockade too. The methodology is quite useful next to great forests and marshland too, but at completely flat terrain its efficacy is low.

== Theoretical layout of a typical fortress ==
=== Blockade line ===
Closest to the enemy are several lines of anti-tank obstacles and minefields. Usually it means a V or U-trench and a wall or dragon's teeth row, while moats, hedgehogs and berms have been used very rarely because they are difficult to be camouflaged. Behind this lies an extensive, at least 30-meter-wide anti-infantry entanglement, which is a mixed system of apron fences, wire concertinas, electric fences, traps, mines, nail spikes and spike pits. Both elements are well camouflaged by good location (relief) and by plants (e.g. small height bushes in front of ditches).

=== The (circularly defensible) fortified zone ===
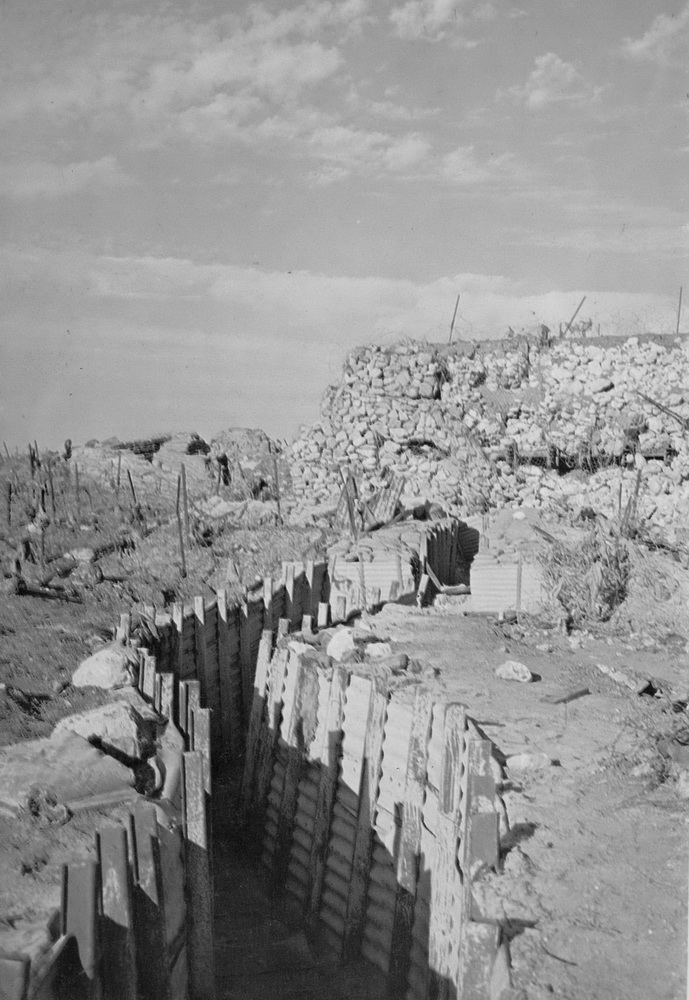
Bar Lev Line

150–300 meters away (effective firing range of machine guns) from the barrier have been built 2 or 3 rings or meandering lines of zigzagging trenches that are adapted terrain and natural objects (e.g. rocks and humps) at every point. Many individual opened fire positions are on both sides of trenches, which allows firing in all directions since the enemy can bypass obstacles (all round defence). Every fortified point have a few heavy weapons, mainly not too many machine guns, medium mortars and a few anti-tank guns are typical. This operated by a company or a battalion sized force and each section have an own shelter. Machine gun and gun pillboxes are firing almost only enfilade direction, they usually protect obstacles from pioneers or guard the rear side of fortified point against flanking operations.

=== The area between the forts is unprotected ===
The flexible defence line is not intended to constitute an impenetrable barrier, just close roads passable by vehicles, in order to making the movement of tanks and trucks impossible. For this purpose all of roads in the intermediate woodlands, swamps and mountainous zones has been demolished or blockaded as irreversibly as possible. Hostile infantry (rarely cavalry too) easily passes through but without resupply they quickly run out of material. After this a small rapid pursuing unit is able to defeat attacker forces unit even up to a regiment size. These skier, riding, cycling or motorcycling mobile forces have strength of a company or less, and use only light arms. The Finnish and Hungarian border guards were able to destroy larger armored forces which passed through the main barrier successfully, but became immobilised by a blocked road.

Two main defense lines following each other, first (stronger) at outer and second (slightly weaker) at inner periphery of the impassable zone, in a few cases a third belt has been built in the middle of the area. Since fortress line operated by relatively small staff, most of the army form infantry and mobile corps, thus they are free to be used in offensive operations. The flexible method based on and depends upon common counterattacks and infiltrator assaults. The effectiveness of the attacks of rapid units and main forces intensified by the advantage of strong rearguard (the line) where they can retreat to at any time.

== Effectiveness ==
=== Mannerheim Line ===
Unlike the French Maginot Line and other similar forts made with huge bunkers and lines of dragon's teeth, the Mannerheim Line was mostly built by utilizing the natural terrain. Many items such as fallen trees and boulders were incorporated into defensive positions. The Finns also mastered camouflage techniques, which they put to good use. The Mannerheim Line was not constructed at great expense, since it used predominantly local materials (wood, stones, earthworks).

The line could stop Soviet attacks and almost every assault was without hope of success. As tanks and self-propelled guns were not able to effectively support the offensive, mass attacks suffered heavy casualties similarly to battles of the First World War. The system was effective where no anti-tank ditch had been built, due to hostile infantry being unable to get through obstacle lines, and intruding tanks without infantry support were destroyed after they run out of fuel or ammo. Western literature considered it to be a weak fortification because of the low amount of concrete used and small number of pillboxes. This demonstrates the common misunderstanding of the design principle of flexible lines.

=== Árpád Line ===
With regard to effectiveness per cost rate it was the most potent fortification system during World War 2. The method of system requires complete alignment with the terrain, thus there is no standard layout and every fortress was unique. This fact increases efficacy, since it was not possible to beat different völgyzárs with uniformised methodology. All of buildings, dugouts and obstacles are adapted to the landscape and were especially effectively camouflaged, hence there are no easily targetable large objects in the line.

The construction of Árpád Line was 5-10 times cheaper per kilometer than the German and French counterexamples and it was able to hold off the enemy for an incomparably longer period. Despite the almost tenfold numerical superiority of Soviet forces they were unable to occupy the line and serious damage occurred in only a few "völgyzárs". In several cases (e.g. Gyimesbük) the company-scaled defensive groups (250-400 border guards) successfully faced greater-than-division-sized Soviet forces (10000-15000 soldiers supported by heavy artillery). Hungarian mountain infantry groups fought as effective as Finnish skiers against invading hostile troops. Every fallen Hungarian border guard in Arpad Line demanded 483 killed Soviet, despite the barely equipped status of "völgyzárs". However, due to a defeat at southern front Hungarian Army orderly retreated from the line later.

=== Bar Lev Line ===
This fortress evolved from a group of rudimentary fortifications placed along the canal line. Israel developed the fortifications into an elaborate defense system spanning 150 km along Suez Canal that were described as "one of the best anti-tank ditches in the world." The Bar Lev Line incorporated a massive, continuous 20–25 metres height sand well to prevent amphibious landings. Behind this was the line of 35 circularly defensible fortified strongpoints manned by a platoon (the other two lines held companies at strongpoints, this was the second major mistake of Israeli planning). Behind the line was an armored division with various support formations to execute possible (and required) counterattacks. One of the forts in this fortification system has been named after the Hungarian capital, Budapest.

In the Yom Kippur War some of the strongpoints stopped Egyptian forces, but the line was under-planned, and too few soldiers kept to the firing points. Because the sand wall proved to be surprisingly vulnerable to water cannons, the line delayed the assaulting forces for nine to sixteen hours instead of the expected 48 hours, but this delay was sufficient for to Israeli armour to mobilise. The few excavated passages did not allow Egyptian forces to transport sufficient resupply for attacking forces which significantly contributed to their defeat.

Some defense lines used similar methodology during the Cold War (Viet Cong trenches), and even nowadays Kurdish People's Protection Units use trenches in a reminiscent manner.

== See also ==
- Defence in depth
- Mobile Defense
- Fortification
