= Árpád Line =

Hungarian defensive line (built 1941–44)

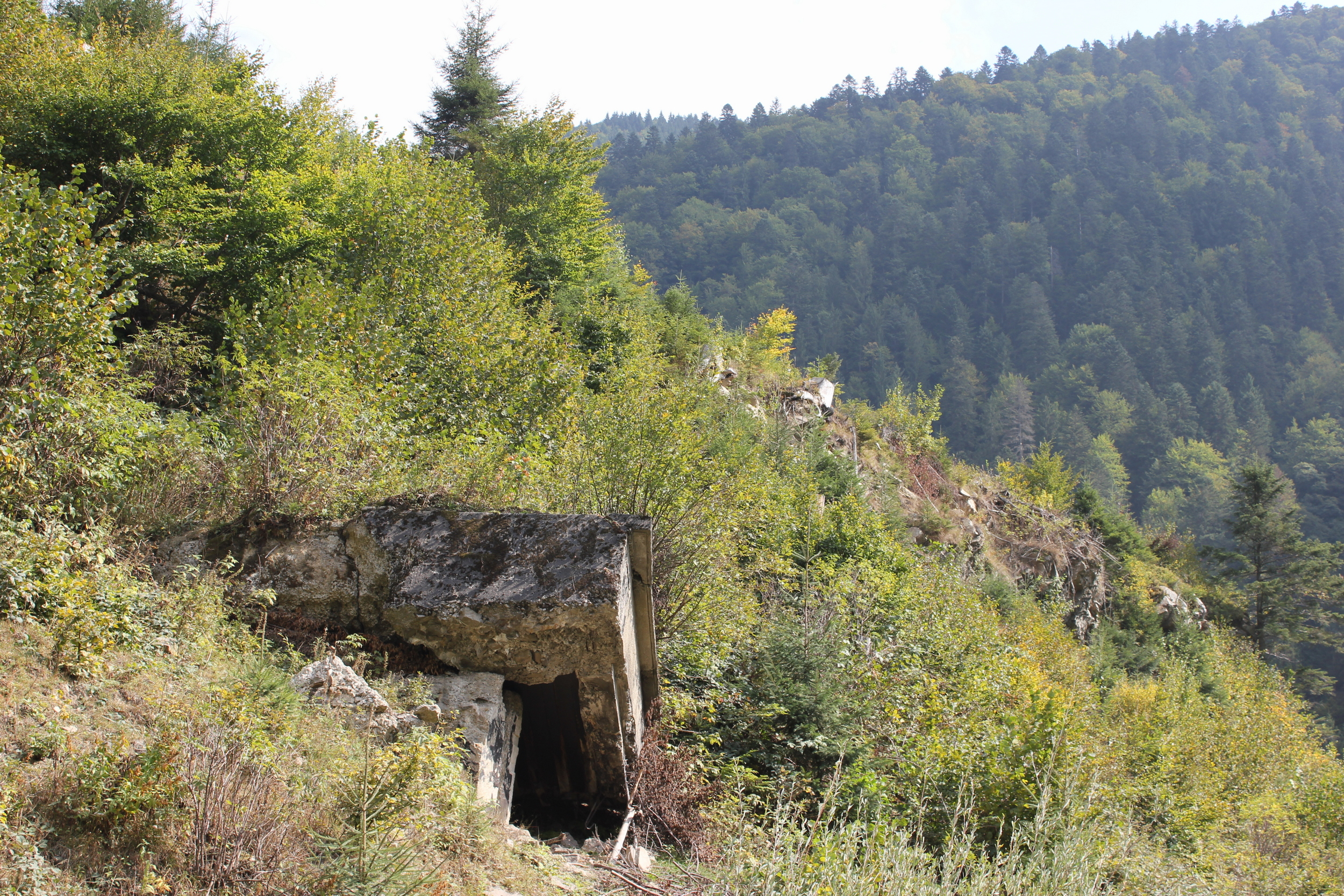
Bunker of the Árpád Line near Ust-Chorna, Ukraine.

The Árpád Line (Hungarian: Árpád-vonal; Romanian: Linia Árpád; Ukrainian: Лінія Арпада) was a line of fortifications built in 1941-44 in the north-eastern and eastern Carpathian Mountains, along the border of Kingdom of Hungary. It was named after Árpád, the head of the Hungarian tribes. The main function of the Line was to protect Northern Transylvania (including Székely Land) and Carpathian Ruthenia from the east.

The Árpád Line was the main line of defence; the Hunyad and Prinz Eugene Lines lay in front of it.

== Theoretical background: the flexible defense ==
General Teofil Hárosy (pioneer) developed the theory of flexible defense in 1939-1940. "Flexible" defense-lines (Mannerheim Line, Árpád Line, Bar Lev Line) were not based on dense lines of heavily armed, large and expensive concrete pillboxes (as the Maginot and Siegfried systems were). Their protective capacity hinged on multiple lines of well-designed obstacles fitting into the environment. All roads passable by tanks and trucks were closed by a "völgyzár", but the intermediate areas were unprotected. The flexible defense only closed possible supply lines, thus the enemy could bypass the fortified line, but every battlegroup without resupply quickly ran out of ammo and food. Thus, the Árpád line was based on small, circularly defensible fortified zones, rather than a continuous impenetrable line of fortresses. Most of the roads were destroyed in the forested, mountainous and swampy areas between forts. Therefore, the task of defenders was to protect the obstacles, and not fight with the main Soviet forces.

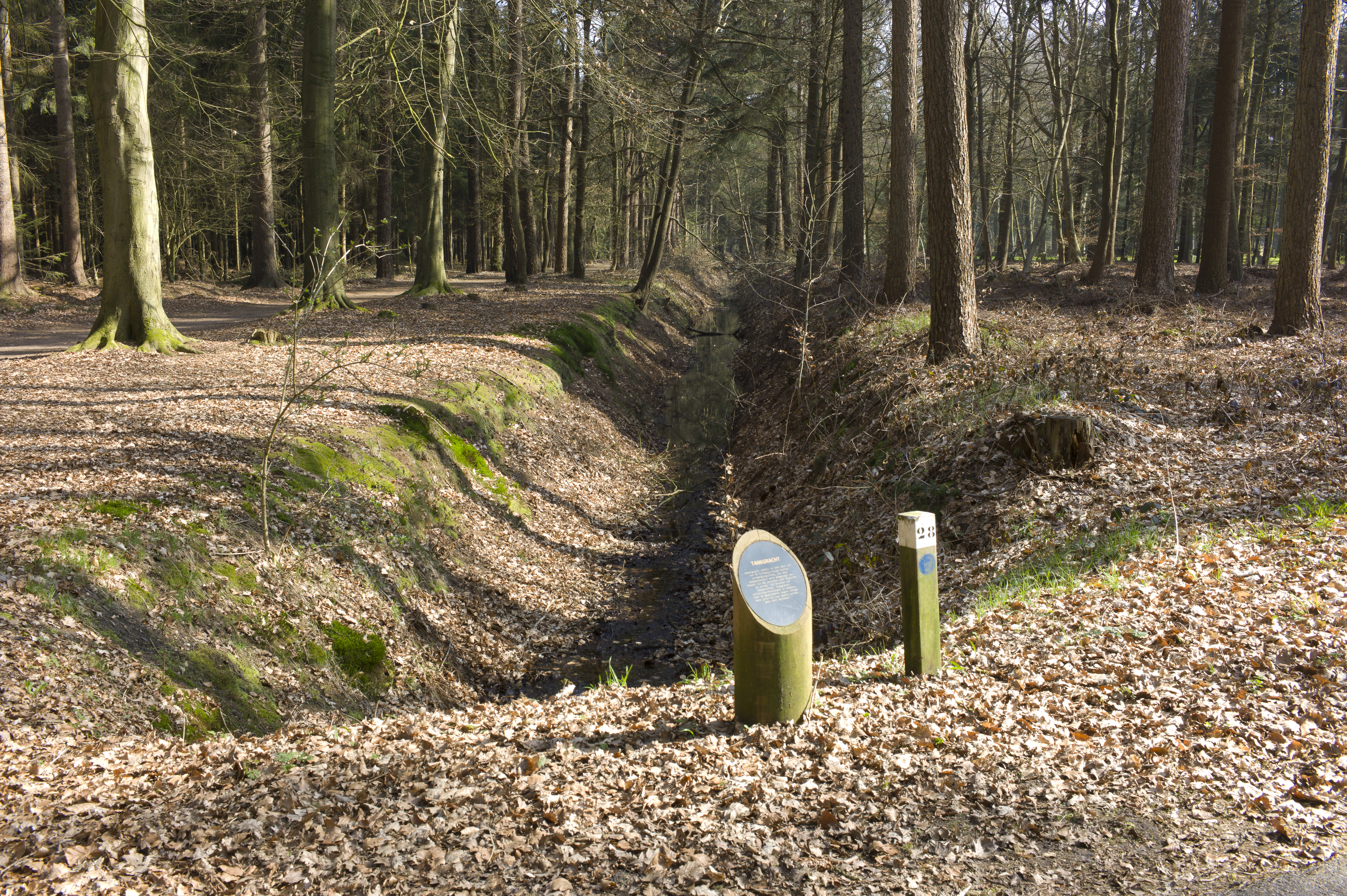
Typical anti-tank trench. A similar design were used in the Árpád Line.

The main method of this type of field fortification was to close potential vehicular transport and attack routes with multiple anti-tank ditches, hedgehogs, dragon's teeth and mine fields. These obstacle-zones are followed by a quite small but peculiarly complex system of ditches and barbed wire obstacles, which protects the anti-tank barrier against sappers, bridge-layer tanks and engineer teams. The semi-mobile engagement is the main point, soldiers fight in open firing positions, bunkers served as only shelters during bombardment. Thus, it is possible to quickly reallocate soldiers between the points of defense (manpower not locked in pillboxes), and counterattacks feasible by defense force. This type of defensive line required 5-10 times less manpower and concrete per kilometer than the Maginot or Siegfried Lines, with equal (or more) effectiveness; but far more imagination was required from the builders because every part of the line had an inevitably unique design, adapted to local conditions.

The main defense line usually lies on a hilltop on the edge of a forest, and divided into circularly defensible independent sectors (platoon size). A sector includes 3 (or more) trench-rings and 1 or 2 ferro-concrete shelter(s) surrounded by 30 m (or more) wide zone of anti-personnel obstacles (barbed wire, electric fences, wide variety of non-explosive traps) and 2 (or more) V- or U-shaped anti-tank trenches or anti-tank walls. Independent sectors were connected by communication trenches into a defensive zone or fortress (Hungarian: völgyzár – literally "valley fort").

Unlike the Maginot and Siegfried-type lines, the overall barrier and trench system of flexible defense lines were hard to detect. It was a complex net of small objects, and all of them were entirely adapted to the natural topography (e.g., natural steep slopes as anti-tank wall, trenches curving as isolines). All buildings, dugouts and obstacles are adapted to the landscape, and there are no easily targetable large objects, while Maginot-like bunkers were impossible to be camouflaged enough.

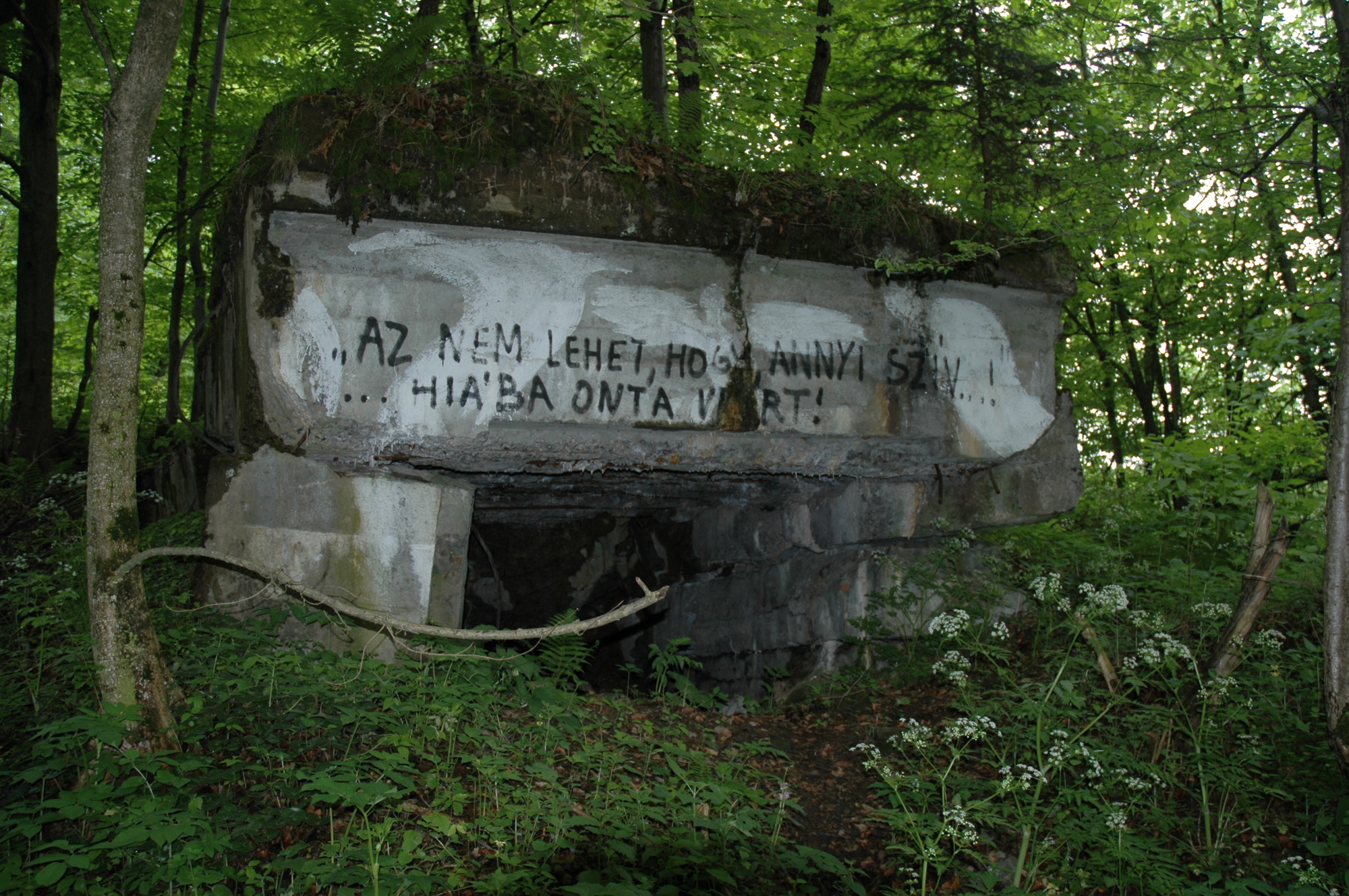
Gun shelter of Árpád Line in the Latorice River valley. Hungarian text on the wall: "It cannot be true, that many hearts ... bleed in vain"

Therefore, the enemy is forced to attack the defensive trenches with conventional infantry assault (as during World War I) at the cost of terrible losses, without assistance of armored forces or line-of-sight firing guns. It is a "flexible" type of defence line because soldiers are not locked in bunkers, the defensive platoons could be regrouped between open firing positions (firing positions and dugouts made of wood and earth) and independent sectors. Furthermore, soldiers can easily carry out a counterattack (supported by heavy weapons of the Line) optionally. Because of the possibility of redeployment, significantly less manpower is required than Maginot-like defenses. The semi-mobile engagement was also psychologically preferable to the claustrophobic feeling rendered by Maginot-like bunkers in the long term.

After the fall of Maginot and Metaxas Lines, a Hungarian commission assessed German experience with fortifications. According to reviews of the group, Maginot and Siegfried-like bunkers have a lot of weaknesses. Air inlets and loopholes were destructible by small groups of infiltrating sappers, they were too big (camouflage and costs), could be blinded by small concentrated smoke screens, and required sizable manpower. Meanwhile, the Mannerheim line proved flexible defense lines were almost immune to a few sappers or small smoke screens. At Sedan, a German sapper group was able to break through the main defense within 41 minutes. Thus only one "fortress" consists of a large-scale bunker system in the Árpád line, all other fortress consist of non-fighting bunkers with a floor area of less than 8x8m. Because the method requires complete alignment with the terrain, there is no standard layout, thus every fortress was unique. This fact increased efficiency, it was not possible to beat different völgyzárs with uniform methodology.

== Layout of a typical völgyzár ==
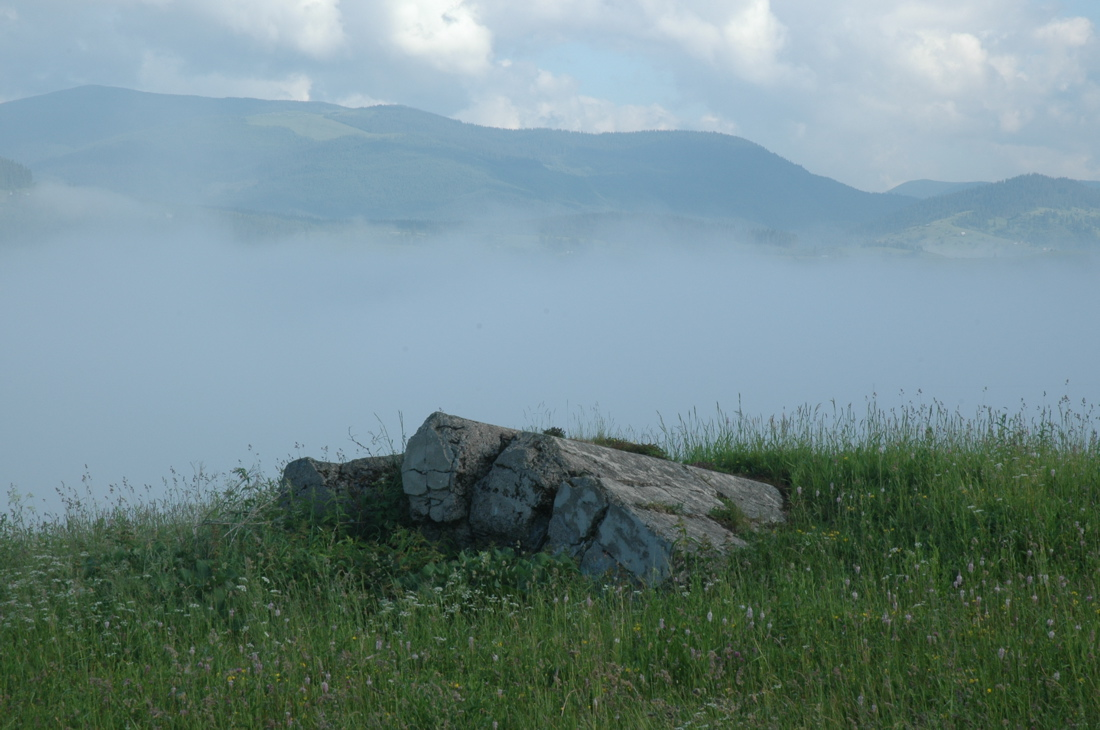
A destroyed shelter of the Árpád Line near Yasinia

There were 29 fortresses in the Árpád Line. A typical völgyzár was operated by a fortress company comprising 200-300 soldiers. In comparison, a similarly sized defensive area was operated by a division-sized force in the Maginot Line. The fortress company was divided into three to four circularly defensible independent sectors. Each had a platoon-sized manpower with two light machine guns and few submachine guns, and every squad and heavy weapon had its own shelter. The platoon had three or more concentric trench-rings, and a few dugouts surrounded by a 30–50 m wide zone of anti-personnel obstacles. The independent sectors were interconnected by communication trenches and telephone lines. The fortress also had heavy weapons concentrated at most vulnerable areas. Typically, a fortress had four heavy machine guns, two to four light (37 or 40mm) anti-tank guns, and a few mortars (all of them operated in multiple earthen-wood, open artillery positions). At the rear side there were two to four well camouflaged independent MG pillboxes in case of attack from behind. The "fortress" also had a HQ bunker, a medical station, some dugouts for ammunition and equipment, a small engineer squad (equipped with mines and flamethrowers), and a kitchen. The whole fortress was surrounded by two or more V- or U-shaped anti-tank trenches or anti-tank walls, minefields, and natural obstacles (e.g., escarpments or steep slopes); thus, there was no passable way for tanks to approach the fortress.

All soldiers and heavy weapons have multiple (three or more) open firing positions connected by trenches in order to make it difficult to keep them under fire. Concrete bunkers, usually only shelters (in case of artillery bombardment), just a few MG pillboxes had loopholes. Concrete MG and gun pillboxes in the Mannerheim and Árpád Lines were particularly well camouflaged, and almost all of them were side-firing in order to defend anti-tank obstacles against sappers; thus, none of them fired directly toward the enemy. Because these buildings were not exposed to the enemy's line-of-sight artillery, they could have been made much thinner than the Maginot-type ones. Therefore, it has vastly less concrete per kilometer compared to other lines. Few types of buildings on the Árpád Line have unified plans; the main types were: heavy MG pillbox (4.6 x 4.6m), light MG pillbox (1.2 x 1.2m), shelter for a squad with rounded top (5 x 4m), shelter for a gun or mortar (7x4m), HQ bunker (6 x 4m), medical bunker (7 x 4m), observation post (1.2 x 1.2m), dragon's teeth,

== Effectiveness ==
After the Battle of Kursk, only the Árpád Line was able to detain the Soviet army for more than three weeks. With regard to effectiveness per cost rate, it was the most potent fortification system during World War II. The construction of the Árpád Line was 10-20% the cost per kilometer of its German and French counterparts, and it was able to hold off the enemy for an incomparably longer period. The losses were extremely low, despite the enemy's numerical superiority and the poor equipment of Hungarian Armed Forces.

Due to lack of funds, almost none of the völgyzár had been completed. Most of them had significantly less manpower, barbed wire, firearms, and heavy weapons than featured in the official specifications (between 60-80% readiness). Without efforts by Ruthenian and Szekler volunteers, the Hungarian armed forces would not have been able to complete any of the forts. A portion of the unbuilt shelters was replaced with foxholes, and a few völgyzár lacked anti-tank trenches. In the case of two völgyzár, less than 50% of work had been done.

The biggest deficit was in grenades and anti-tank weapons; thus, fortresses never received anti-tank gun larger than 47 mm. Most of them received only three or fewer obsolete 37mm PaK guns. In fact, these border guard companies were among the poorest equipped units in the Hungarian Armed Forces. They were equipped with old captured Yugoslav guns and obsolete remaining machine guns from World War I. Despite this situation, however, the well-designed fortresses proved to be surprisingly effective.

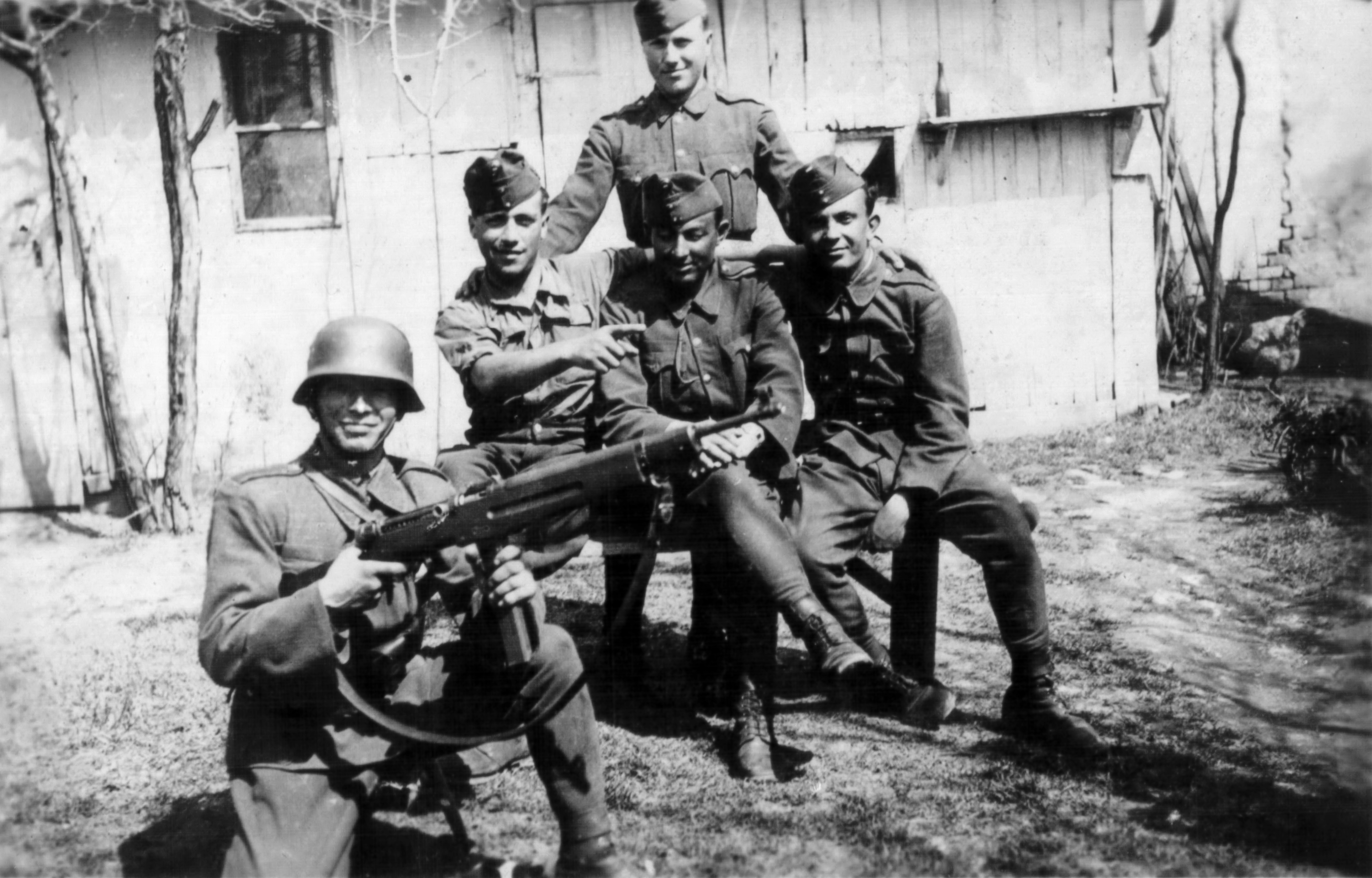
Hungarian mountain infantry in the Carpathians.

During the autumn of 1944, the Southern Soviet Army and the whole Romanian combined forces commenced a multi-stage, full-sized attack, which immediately stalled. Despite their more than tenfold numerical superiority, Soviet and Romanian forces were completely unable to occupy a single fort, and serious damage occurred in only a few völgyzár, as happened in the Mannerheim Line. In several cases (e.g., Gyimesbük), the company-scaled defensive groups (comprising 250 border guards) successfully faced greater-than-division-sized Soviet forces (comprising 10000-15000 soldiers). For every fallen Hungarian border guard on the Arpad Line, 483 Soviet soldiers were killed, despite the severe lack of equipment by the defenders in the völgyzárs. At the end of October, the Hungarian forces retreated in orderly fashion from the Line, because Northern Transylvania fell from the previously protected southern border after Romania had joined the Allies and the subsequent Soviet occupation of Romania. Soviet troops advancing along the Danube had left the Line outflanked.

Despite the unprecedented success of the Árpád Line, only a few researchers have examined the fortress. However, the theory of flexible defense was successfully used later by the Bar Lev Line, and one of the forts in this fortification system has been named after the Hungarian capital, Budapest.
