= Mannerheim Line =

Winter War defensive line used by Finland

Coordinates: 60°30′N 29°25′E

- Karelian Isthmus
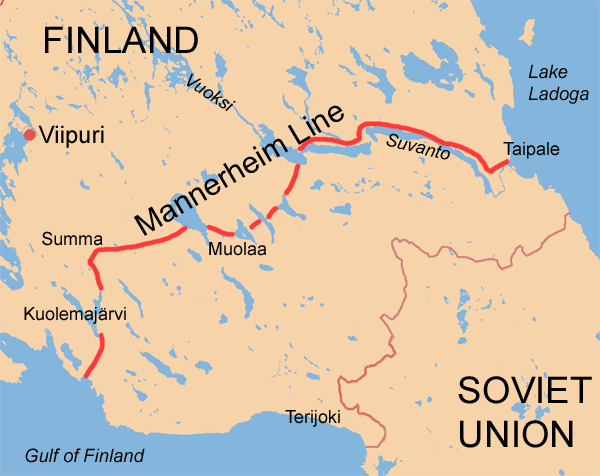
- The Mannerheim Line from the Gulf of Finland to Lake Ladoga

Site information
- Type: Defensive line
- Controlled by: Finland

Site history
- Built: 1920–1924, 1932–1939
- In use: 1939–1940
- Materials: Wood, boulders, concrete, steel, natural features
- Battles/wars: Winter War

The Mannerheim Line (Finnish: Mannerheim-linja, Swedish: Mannerheimlinjen) was a defensive fortification line on the Karelian Isthmus built by Finland against the Soviet Union. While this was never an officially designated name, during the Winter War it became known as the Mannerheim Line, after the Finnish Army's then commander-in-chief Field Marshal Baron Carl Gustaf Emil Mannerheim. The line was constructed in two phases: 1920–1924 and 1932–1939. By November 1939, when the Winter War began, the line was by no means complete.

== History of construction ==
=== Background ===
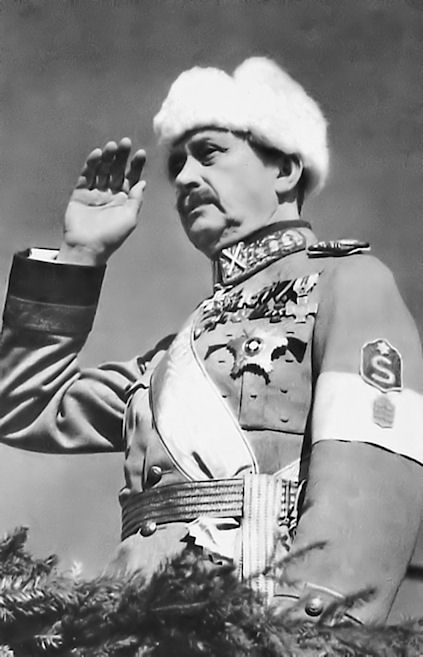
Carl Gustaf Emil Mannerheim in 1937

After the October Revolution in the Russian Empire, the Finns declared independence in 1917. Although the Soviet Union recognized Finland's independence, the Finns did not trust their sincerity. The relationship between the two countries deteriorated, with Soviet Russia supporting the Red Guard during the Finnish Civil War in 1918. After the victory of the White Guard, a group of Finnish communists fled to Soviet Russia and established the Communist Party of Finland.

The situation was considered dangerous for a new nation like Finland, especially as the capital of the new communist revolution was nearby Petrograd, (now Saint Petersburg). Furthermore, before the Treaty of Tartu in 1920, the border area was restless. The former general of Imperial Russia, C.G.E. Mannerheim, strongly opposed the Bolsheviks (Communists). Construction work on the Karelian Isthmus had already begun when the Bolsheviks won the Russian Civil War in 1922. The line was constructed in two phases: In 1920–1924 and 1932–1939.

=== Planning in 1918 ===
During the civil war of 1918, the Finnish government and high command started to develop defence plans to protect against possible attacks from the Soviet Union. The main such route was the Karelian Isthmus. The most endangered part of that isthmus was to the west, near the Gulf of Finland, the eastern part was better protected by the natural water-ways of Vuoksi, Suvanto and Taipaleenjoki. The first plans for a defensive line were commissioned by Mannerheim from the Swedish volunteer Lieutenant Colonel A. Rappe at the beginning of May 1918. Rappe's line was placed close to the border and designed to protect two rail lines that crossed the border, which could be used in a counterattack toward Petrograd. When Mannerheim resigned at the end of May, Rappe's plans were abandoned.

The young nation possessed no guard troops, and the border area was insecure. Security of the border on the isthmus was the responsibility of the 2nd Division and local White Guard units in June 1918. In that form they were also entrusted with the security of the fortification construction. First efforts were weak depots without any concrete.

The Germans had ordered Colonel Otto von Brandenstein to investigate defensive positions on the Karelian Isthmus; he delivered his plan on 16 July. He was the first to suggest using the lake isthmuses, where smaller lakes like Lake Kuolemajärvi, Lake Muolaa, Lake Suvanto and the Taipaleenjoki river divided the Karelian Isthmus to the shorter land sections, as defensive positions, his plan was initially approved by the Finnish high command in August 1918. In October 1918, the Finnish government allocated 300,000 marks for the work, which was to be carried out by German and Finnish sappers as well as Russian prisoners of war. However, the money allocated was insufficient and a lack of building materials and a qualified workforce hampered the building of proper fortifications. With Germany's defeat in The Great War, von Brandenstein's plan was scrapped.

=== Unreinforced concrete bunkers in 1919–1924 ===
During October 1919 Finnish Chief of Staff Major General Oscar Enckell sited the line, mostly following the original course that von Brandenstein had presented. Major J. Gros-Coissy, a member of the French military commission, designed the fortifications together with Finnish Lt Col Johan Fabritius. During the first building period, Fabritius suggested moving the defensive line further to the south-east. The general staff discussed the issue, but Enckell's earlier plans were followed. Furthermore, insufficient funds resulted in a disagreement between the officers and Enckell resigned in 1924. Construction work was interrupted for a long period.

The prime contractor of the fortifications was the Finnish construction company Ab Granit Oy. The first hundred small bunkers were built in 1920–1924. For reasons of cost, the first phase hard fortifications were of unreinforced concrete, which provided only partial protection. The compression density of the concrete was too low to offer resistance to anything larger than medium artillery.

=== First large bunkers 1932–1937 ===
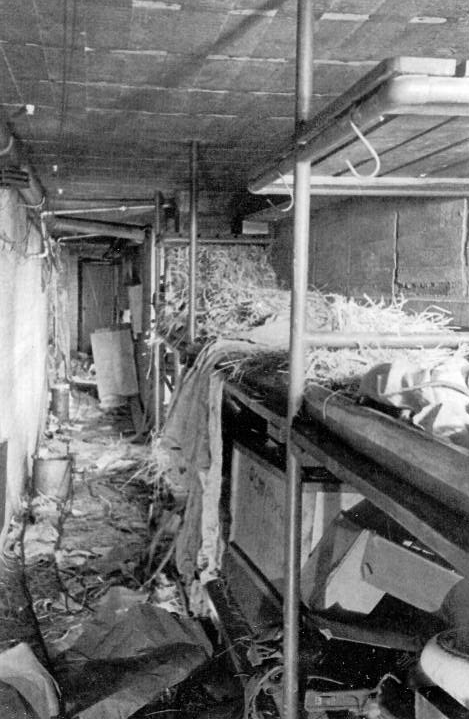
Troop beds in a destroyed bunker on the Mannerheim Line. The bunker is probably Sk 10, built in 1937.

The second construction phase started on 1 April 1934, with Fabritius in command of the construction work. He designed two new kinds of bunker, Ink 1 and Ink 2. The bunkers were mainly designed for troop accommodation, but loopholes were crafted into armour plate in 1938 and 1939. A bunker was typically 15–20 meters in length and 5–6 meters wide. A pioneer battalion constructed six bunkers in the Inkilä sector.

Between 1932 and 1938 the defence budget was such that the Finns could only construct two or three bunkers per year. In 1936 and 1937 they constructed two large strong-points, Sk 10 and Sj 4 in the Summankylä and Summajärvi areas. Two smaller bunkers, Le 6 and 7, in the Leipäsuo sector, and Ink 6, in the Inkilä sector, were also built. New bunkers differed from earlier designs in that their troop accommodation was located between the gun chambers, thus saving the cost of expensive reinforced concrete; the roof was protected by two to three meters of soil and one to three meters of stone rubble.

=== The 1938 and 1939 period ===
The Karelian defensive fortifications received considerably more funds and resources from May 1938, as the European situation worsened. The Finns built new strongholds and modernized old ones. In Summakylä and Summajärvi they built two large Sk 11 bunkers, a "Peltola", a Sj 5, a "Miljoonalinnake", and an incomplete third Sk 17. These bunkers had better fire shelters, ventilation and an observation cloche.

In Suurniemi near Muolaanjärvi, the Finns started the construction of seven new bunkers, Su 1–7. Two others, Su 3 and Su 4, were for accommodation, and the rest were for machine guns nests. They also modernised those structures built in the 1920s. The older bunkers were given added flank-fire capability and enlarged. Some bunkers' loopholes were simply closed-up as part of a plan to make them more suitable for accommodation or command posts.

The line was still incomplete in November 1939.

== Soviet intelligence ==
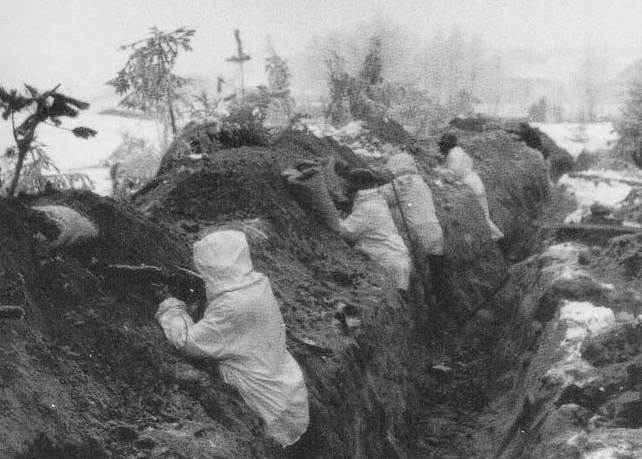
Infantry in a trench on the Mannerheim Line

Soviet intelligence worked in Finland on multiple levels. The Finnish communist party, run from the Soviet Union, had its own military reporting line to the Central Committee. Its intelligence concentrated on the Finnish army, recording the locations of Finnish artillery and defensive positions. The most important Soviet intelligence organisations in Finland were the NKVD and the Fourth Department of the Army General Staff. Leningrad Military District, the Baltic Fleet and border troops under the NKVD conducted espionage operations.

The Finns exposed two espionage cases during the 1930s. Vilho Pentikäinen, a photographer serving on the Finnish general Staff, escaped to the Soviet Union in 1933. The second case was of Simo Haukka; he took photographs and measured roads and terrain for Soviet intelligence in 1935.

Soviet intelligence published a top-secret and very detailed photobook of the Finnish terrain and fortifications in 1938. The book included a seven-page report and 22 pages of maps and photographs. Every issue was numbered, running probably only into dozens. Soviet intelligence activity increased in 1938 and expanded still further in 1939. Before the start of the Winter War, Soviet intelligence published a book for Red Army officers. It was called "Finland. Written Description of March Routes". It was later translated and republished as the "Red Army March Guide to Finland". The guide included over 200 pages of maps and photographs.

Along with the intelligence, the Soviet Union received a detailed map of the defences on the Isthmus. A German military attaché in Helsinki, General Arniké, handed it over in Moscow in September 1939.

== Structure of the Line ==
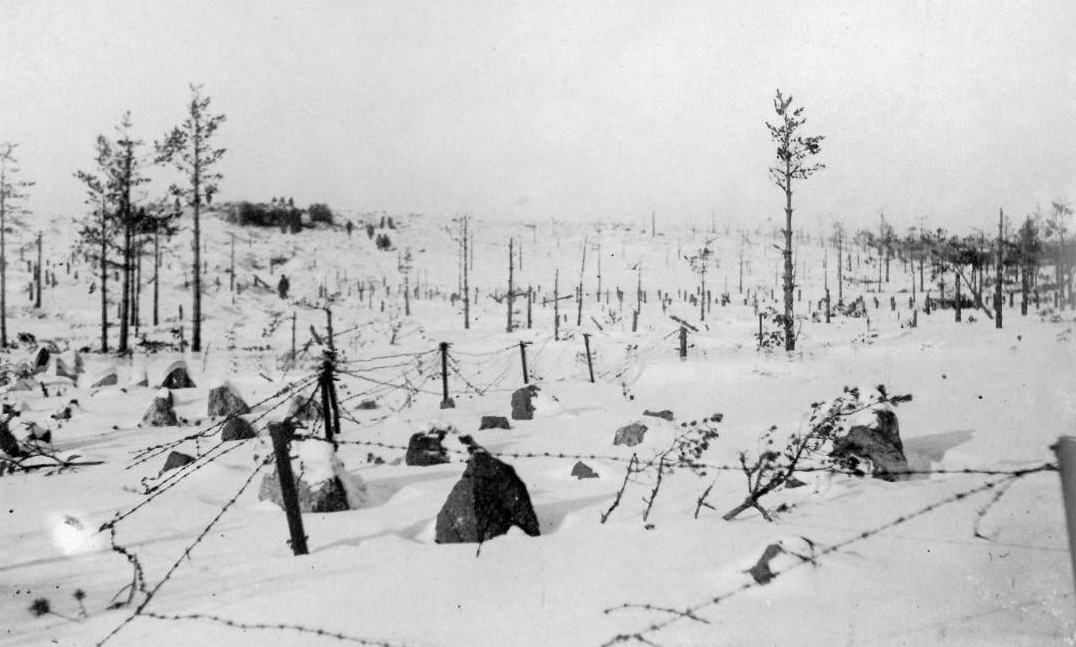
Stone barriers and barbed wire in the line. In the background the Finnish bunker Sj 5, the so-called "Million fortress".

The line ran from the coast of the Gulf of Finland in the west, through Summa to the Vuoksi River and ended at Taipale in the east. It consisted of 157 machine gun positions and eight artillery positions built of concrete. The area around Summa was the most heavily fortified because it was thought to be the most vulnerable position.

The Gulf of Finland coast was guarded by Fort Saarenpää, the side of Lake Ladoga (Laatokka) by Fort Järisevä. These coastal artillery positions had 5", 6" and 10" guns.

Unlike the French Maginot Line and other similar forts made with huge bunkers and lines of dragon's teeth, the Mannerheim Line was mostly built by utilizing the natural terrain. Many items such as fallen trees and boulders were incorporated into defensive positions. The Finns also mastered camouflage techniques, which they put to good use.

The Mannerheim line was not constructed at great expense. Its purpose was to delay more than repel an invasion. It used predominantly local materials. The line applied the methodology of the flexible defence, thus it used trenches and obstacles rather than large bunkers.

The name Mannerheim Line was supposedly coined by Jorma Gallen-Kallela and spread by foreign journalists.

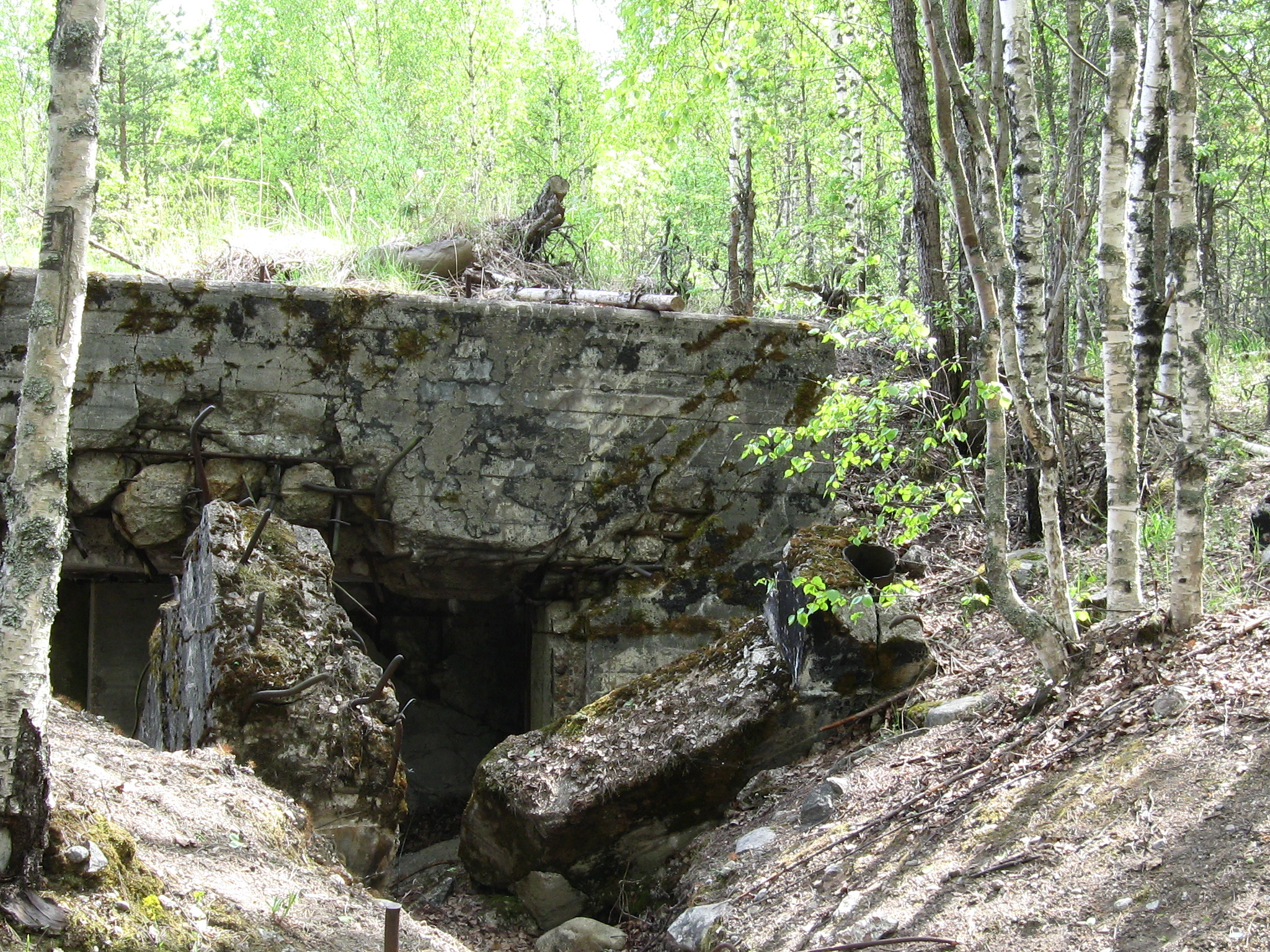
A bunker on high ground 65 (2009)

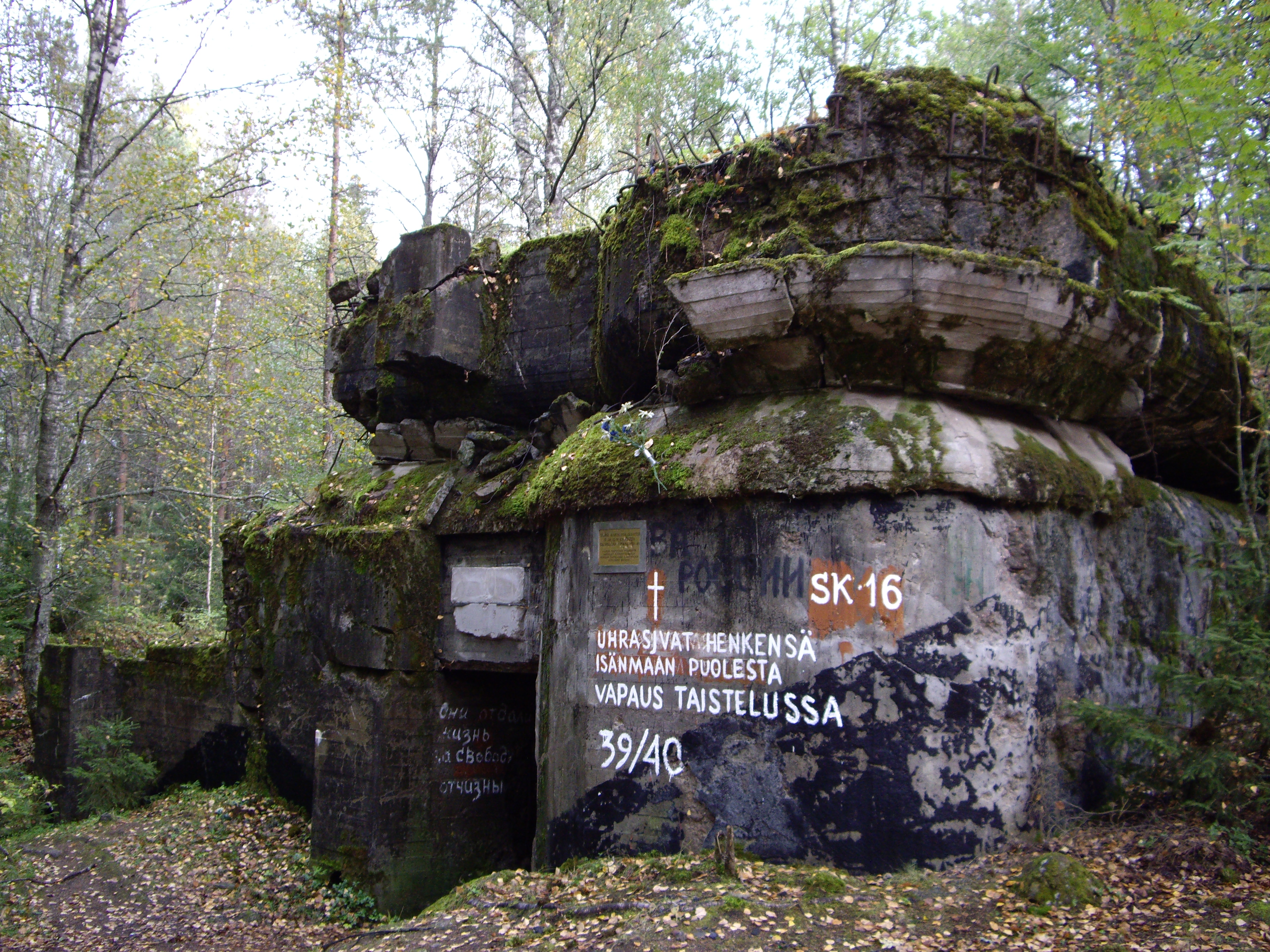
Bunker Sk16 (2009). The modern Finnish graffiti reads: They sacrificed their lives for the country in the struggle for freedom.

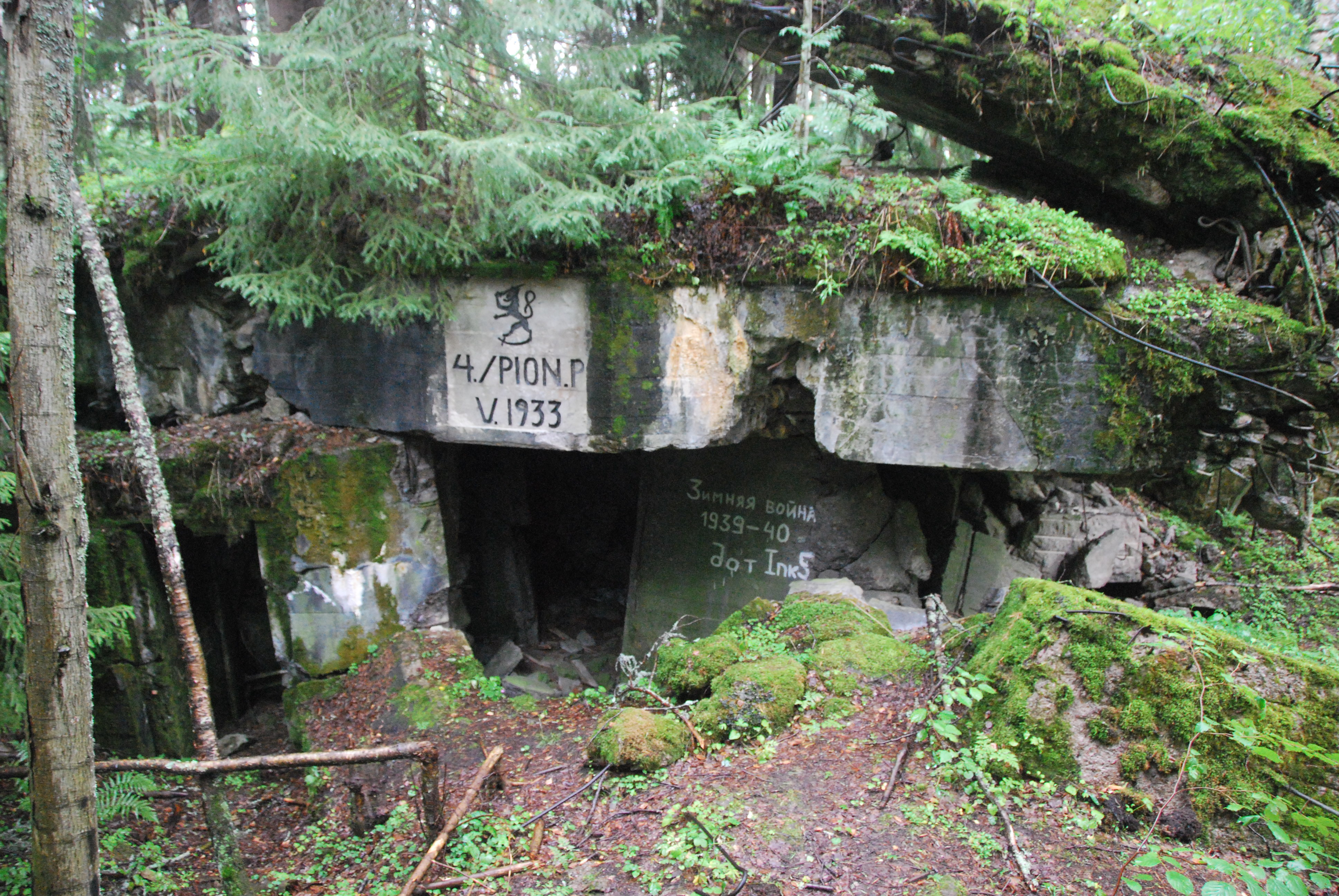
Bunker Ink5 (2011)

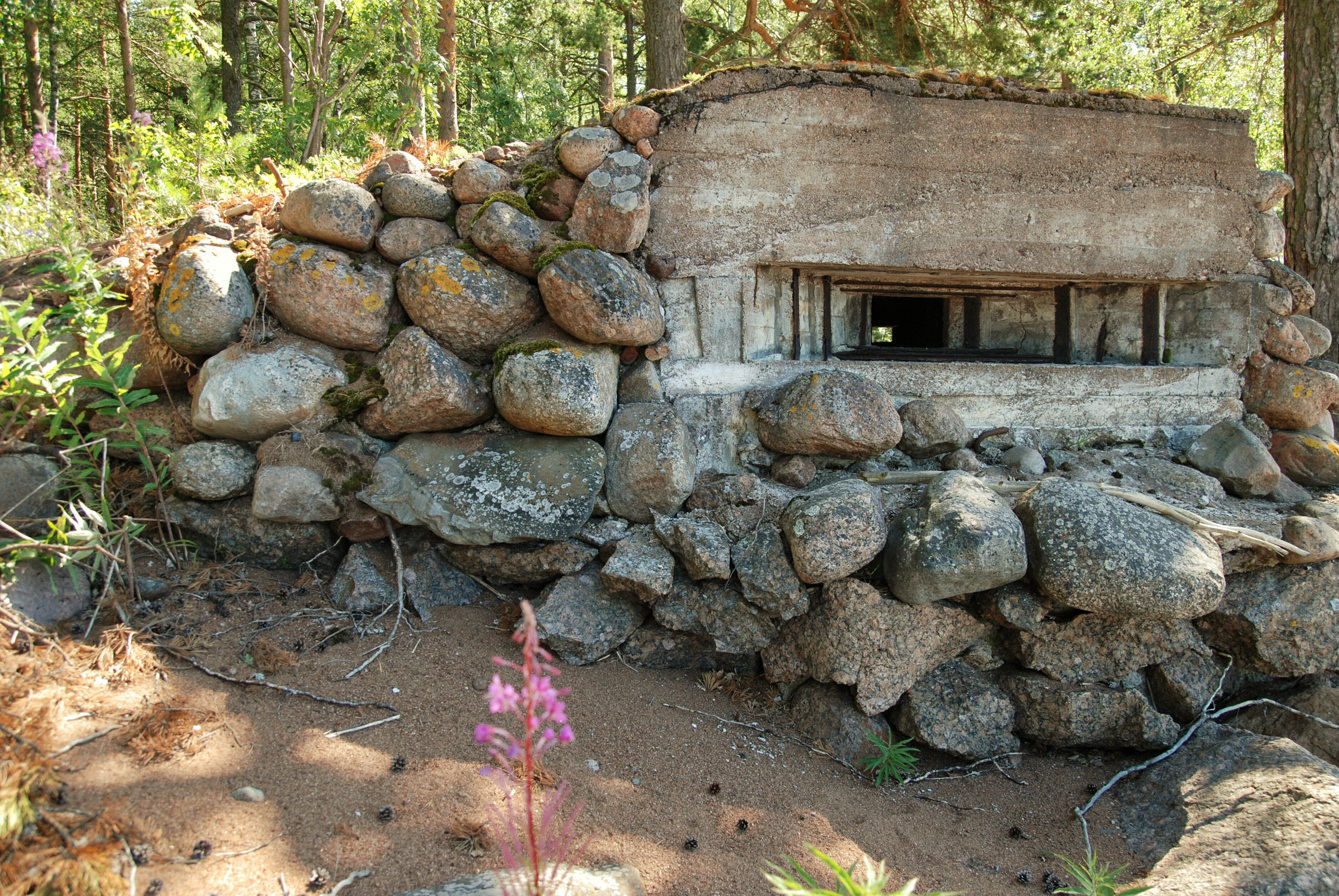
Finnish pillbox

== The Winter War ==
=== The Red Army repelled ===
In the Winter War, the line halted the Soviet advance for two months. The Soviet battleships Marat and Oktyabrskaya Revolutsiya attacked Fort Saarenpää several times during December 1939 and January 1940, but the Finns repelled the attacks, driving off the Revolutsiya by near misses on 18 December 1939.

During the war, both Finnish and Soviet propaganda considerably exaggerated the extent of the line's fortifications: the former to improve national morale, the latter claimed it was stronger than the Maginot Line to explain the Red Army's slow progress against the Finnish defences. Subsequently, the myth of the "heavily fortified" Mannerheim Line entered official Soviet war history and some western sources. The vast majority of the Mannerheim Line simply comprised trenches and other field fortifications. Bunkers along the line were mostly small and thinly spread out; the Line had hardly any artillery.

=== Aftermath ===
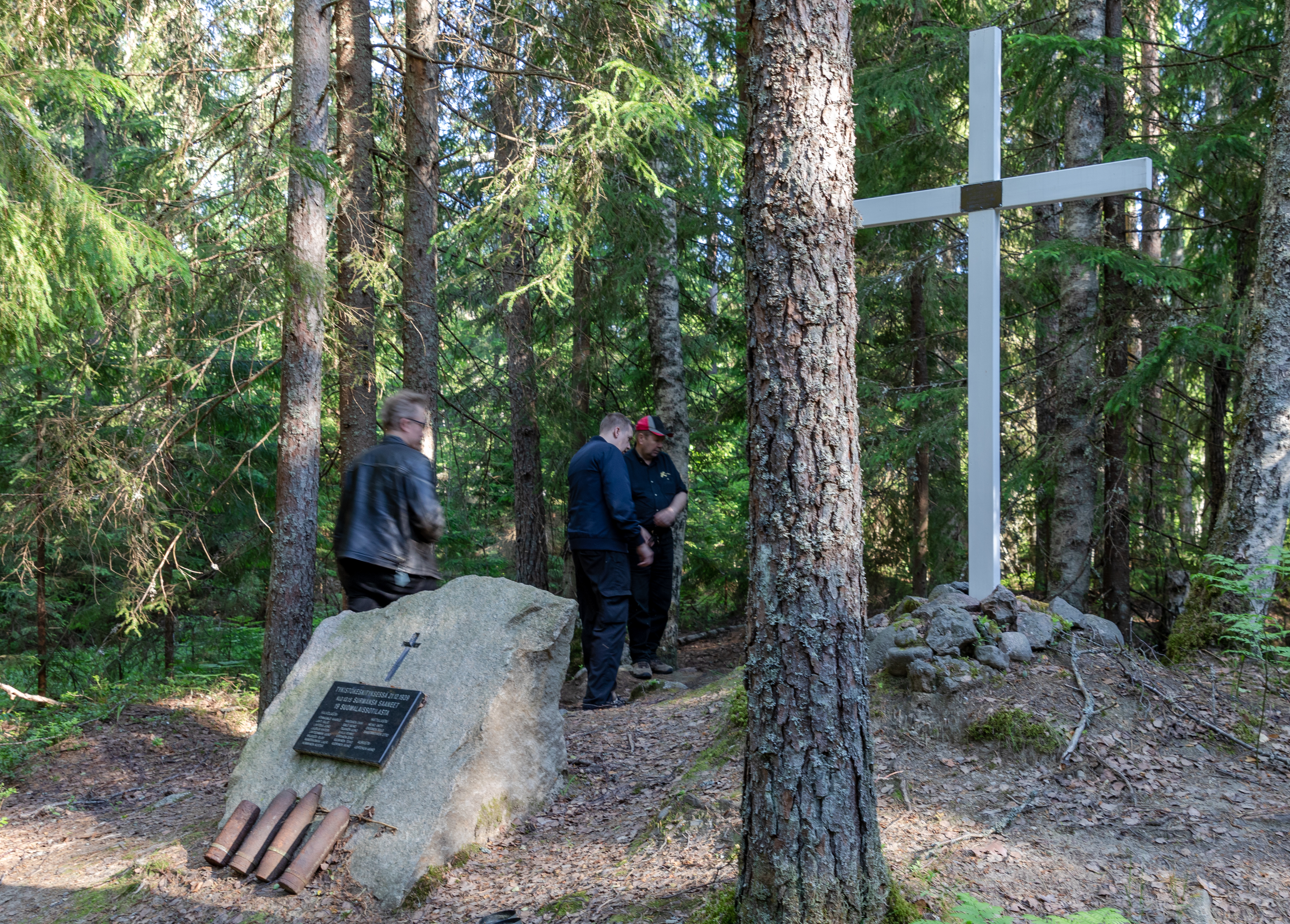
War memorial in Mannerheim Line

Following the Winter War, Soviet combat engineers destroyed the remaining installations. In the Continuation War the line was not re-fortified, although both Soviets and Finns used its natural benefits in defence during the Finnish advance in 1941 and the Soviet offensive in 1944 (see VT-line and VKT-line).

== Debate on the strength of the Mannerheim Line ==
The first month of the Finnish campaign was humiliating for the Red Army. By the third week of the war, Soviet propaganda was working hard to explain the failure of the Red Army to the populace, and claimed that the Mannerheim Line was stronger than the Maginot Line. The Finns originally aimed to make its defence line impregnable, however actual construction progress came nowhere close to this goal by the time the Winter War broke out, in contrast to the Maginot Line which effectively deterred a cross-border assault. The Finns had funds and resources for only 101 concrete bunkers; the equivalent length of the Maginot Line had 5,800 of these structures which were also linked by underground railway connections. The weakness of the line is illustrated by the fact that the amount of concrete used in the whole Mannerheim Line—14,520 cubic metres or 513,000 cubic feet—is slightly less than the amount used in the Helsinki Opera House (15,500 cubic metres or 550,000 cubic feet). The much shorter VT-line used almost 400,000 cubic meters (14,000,000 ft^{3}) of concrete.

However, "flexible" defense lines (Mannerheim Line, Árpád Line, Bar Lev Line) were not based on dense lines of concrete bunkers and pillboxes (as the Maginot system was). The main intention of flexible type field fortification was to close potential traffic and attack barriers with multiplied anti-tank ditches, hedgehogs, and dragon's teeth. These were followed by a complex system of ditches and barbed wire obstacles, which protected the anti-tank barrier against sappers, bridge-layer tanks, and engineer teams. Therefore, the enemy was forced to attack trenches as in World War I, at the cost of numerous losses, without armor and direct fire support. It was termed "flexible defense" because defending soldiers were not 'locked' into bunkers, but the defensive platoons could be regrouped between field fortifications (wood-earth firing posts, dugouts and pillboxes). They would also have the option of carrying out a counterattack. All soldiers and weapons had multiple firing positions in order to make it difficult to keep them under fire. Concrete bunkers were usually only shelters; just a few had crenels. Concrete pillboxes were side-firing in order to defend anti-tank obstacles.

Maginot and Siegfried-like bunkers had numerous weaknesses, such as having destructible air inlets and firing holes, being too large (camouflage and costs), and yet being vulnerable to small sapper teams (at Sedan, a few German soldiers destroyed several machine-gun bunkers with pre-fabricated bombs and smoke grenades), and being blinded by small concentrated smoke screens. The flexible defense lines were almost immune to small sapper teams or small smoke screens, and had no easily targetable objects.

== See also ==
- Salpa Line
- Karelian Fortified Region
- Linea P (Spain)
