= Anti-tank obstacles =

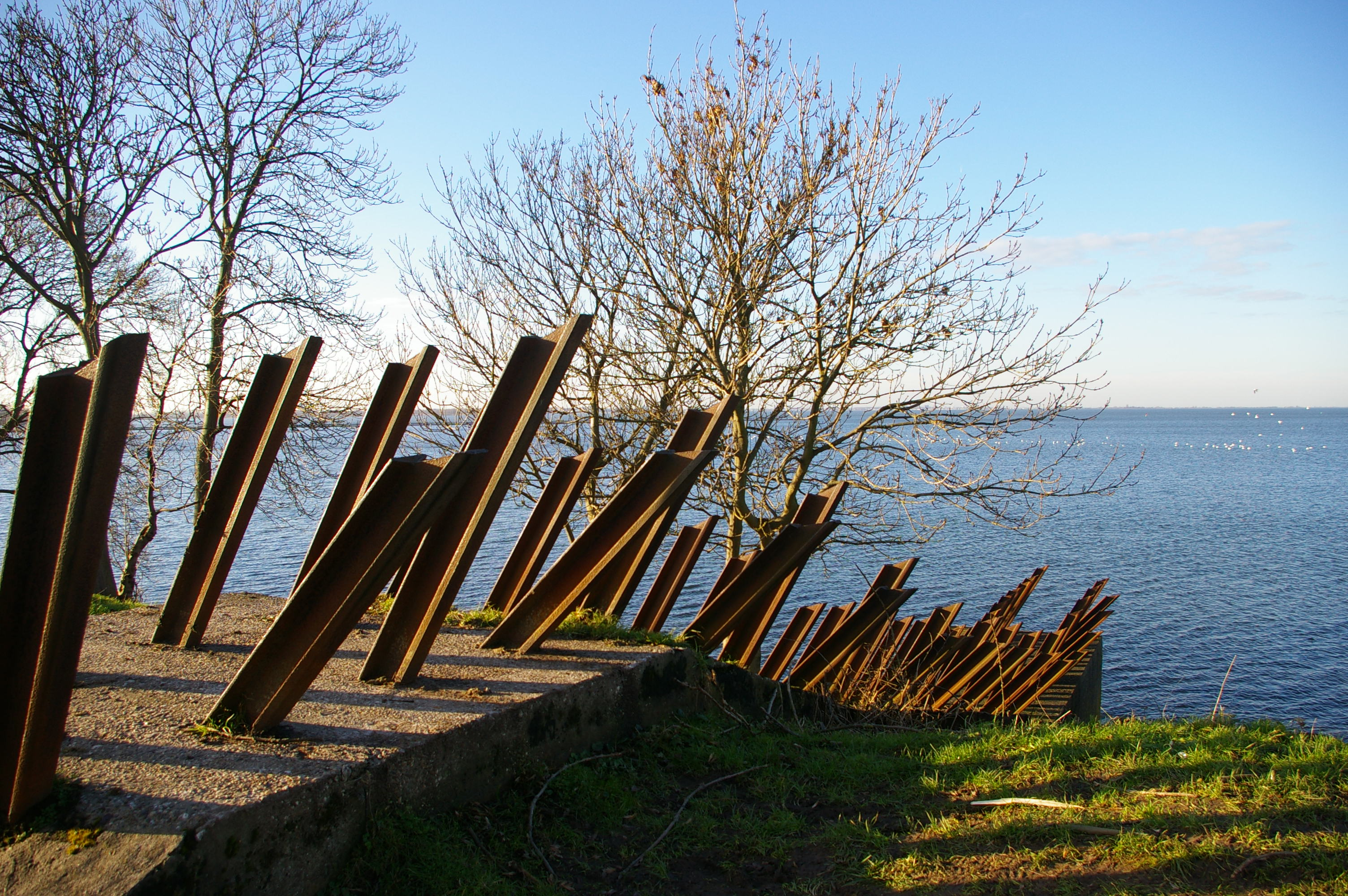
Anti-tank obstacle (Dutch: Aspergeversperring, litt. Asparagus obstacle) on the former IJsselmeer dike just east of Muiden, the Netherlands.

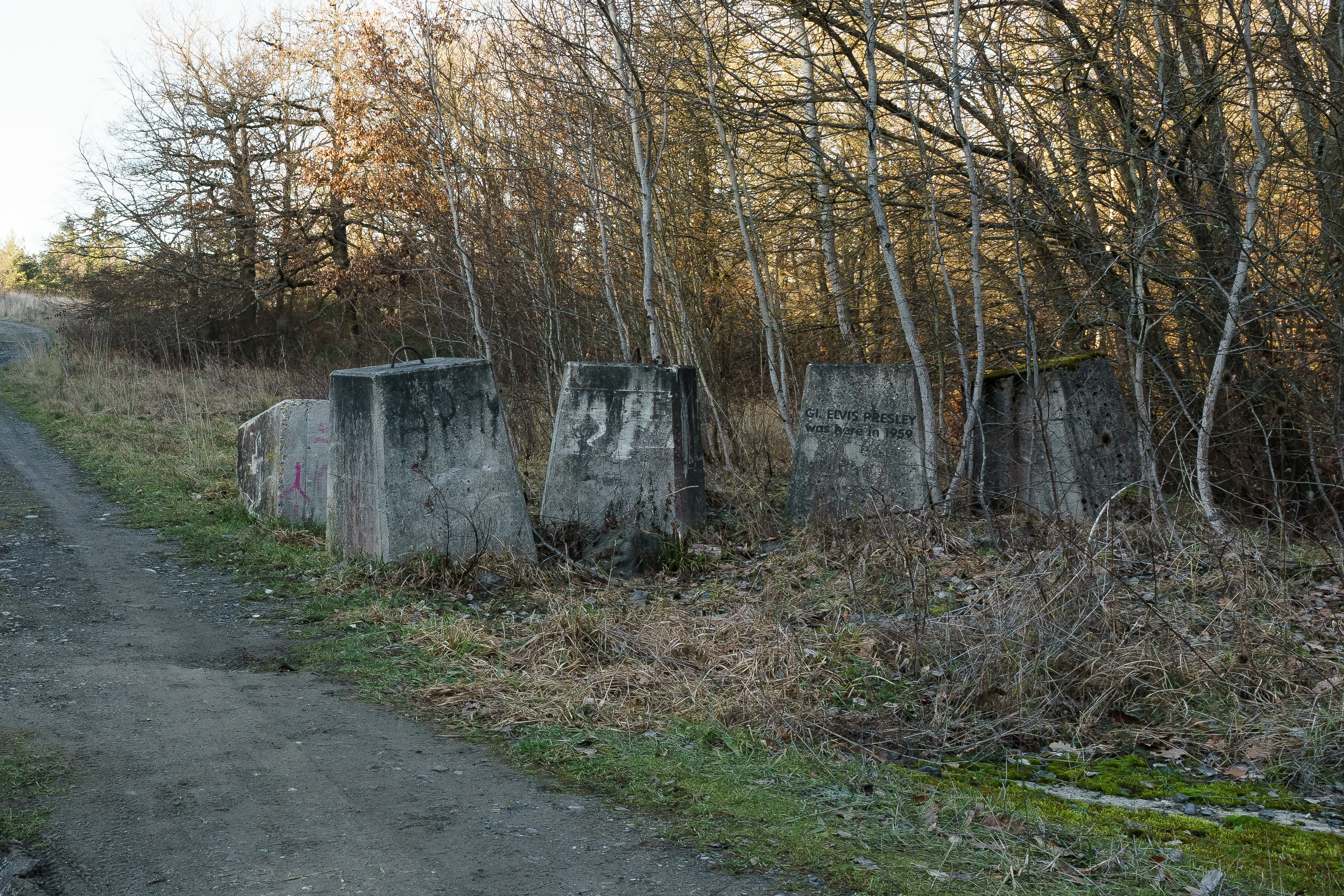
Anti-tank obstacles at Elvis Presley memorial in Germany

Anti-tank obstacles include, but are not limited to:

- The Czech hedgehog, dragon's teeth and cointet-element, all sometimes called "tank traps", are the most famous types of World War II anti-tank obstacles.
- Anti-tank trenches were used on the western front during World War I, and in the Pacific, Europe, and Russia in World War II.
- Anti-tank mines are the most common anti-tank obstacles.

For implementation of various anti-tank obstacles:

- For British anti-tank obstacles, see: British anti-invasion preparations of World War II#Lines and islands.
- The Korean Demilitarized Zone is known to have very large minefields.
- The Berlin Wall used many different obstacles, including several types of anti-tank obstacles.
- The Atlantic Wall used many different obstacles, including several types of anti-tank obstacles.
- The Czechoslovak border fortifications used many different obstacles, including several types of anti-tank obstacles.
- The Mannerheim Line used many different obstacles, including several types of anti-tank obstacles.
- The Maginot Line used many different obstacles, including several types of anti-tank obstacles.

== History ==
The first anti-tank obstacles were used in World War 1 following the introduction of the first tanks. These initially took the form of anti-tank ditches. Later, camouflaged pits designed for tanks to fall into were also used.

== See also ==
- Anti-tank warfare
- Category:Anti-tank obstacles
