= Bar Lev Line =

Chain of Israeli fortifications on the Suez Canal

Coordinates: 30°31′30″N 32°20′6″E

- Suez Canal
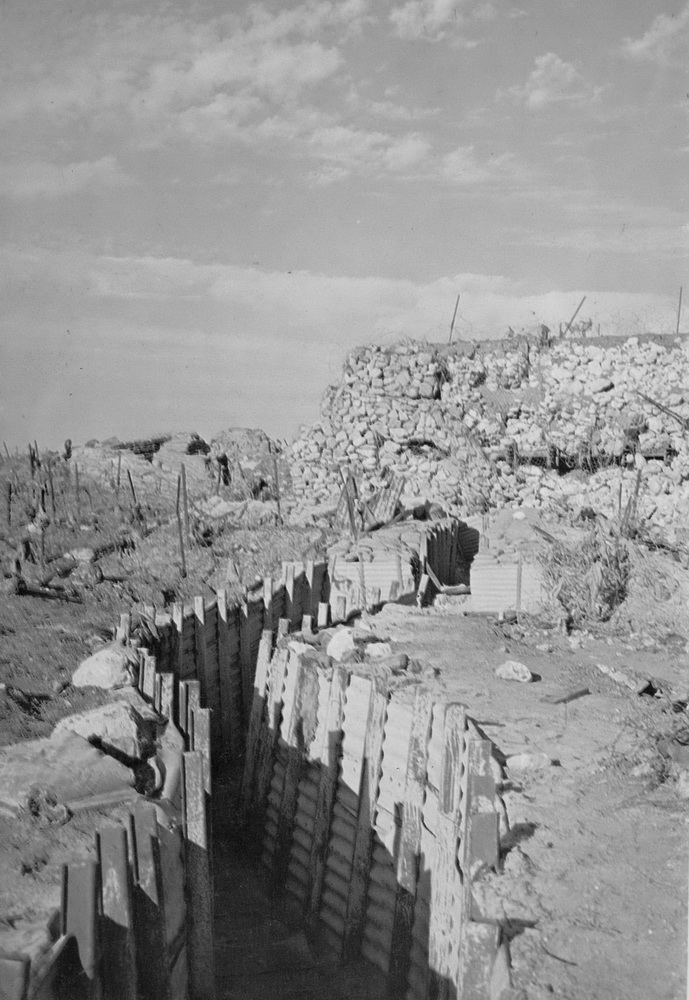

Site information
- Type: Defensive fortification
- Controlled by: Israel
- Condition: Destroyed by Egypt during Operation Badr in 1973

Site history
- Built: 1968–1969
- In use: 1969–1973
- Materials: Concrete, steel, and sand
- Battles/wars: War of Attrition; Yom Kippur War

The Bar Lev Line (Hebrew: קו בר-לב Kav Bar-Lev; Arabic: خط بارليف Khaṭṭ Barlīf) was a chain of fortifications built by Israel along the eastern bank of the Suez Canal shortly after the 1967 Arab–Israeli War, during which Egypt lost the entire Sinai Peninsula and the Gaza Strip. It was considered impenetrable by the Israeli military until it was overrun in 1973 in less than two hours during Egypt's Operation Badr, which sparked the Yom Kippur War.

== History ==
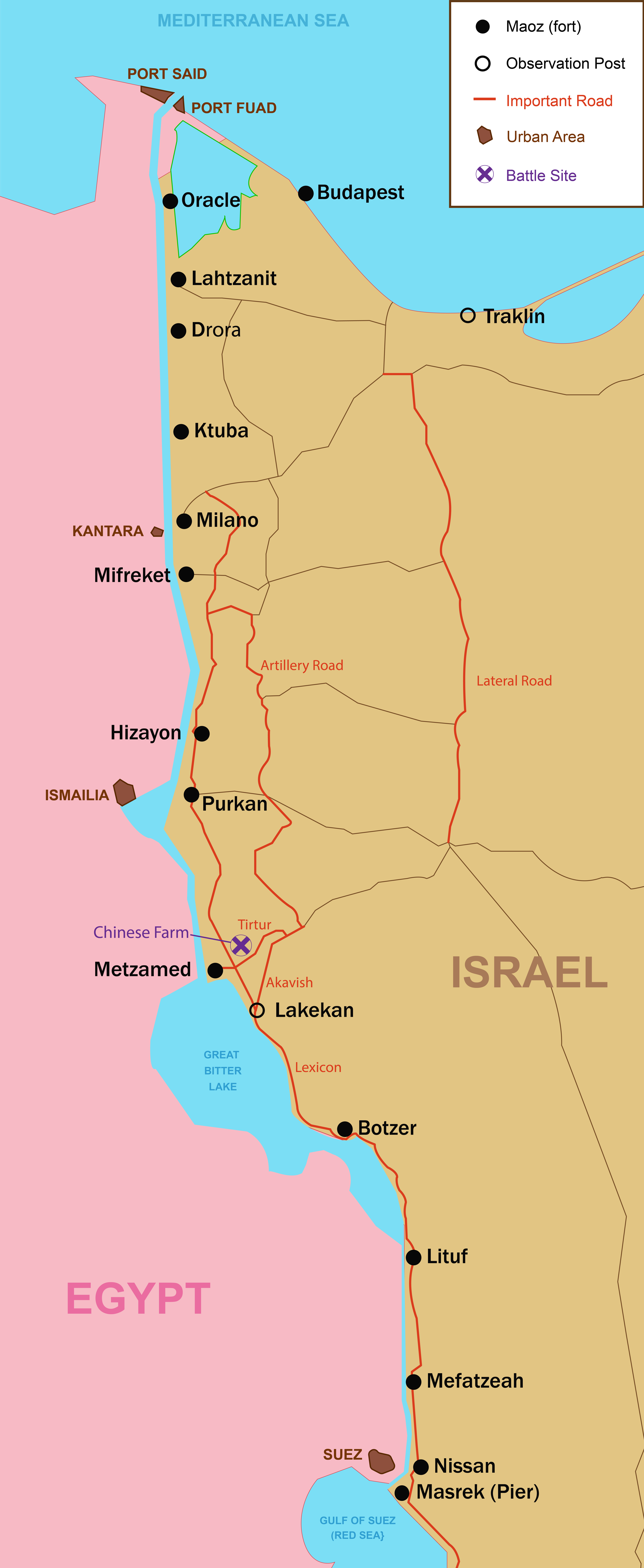
Bar Lev Line

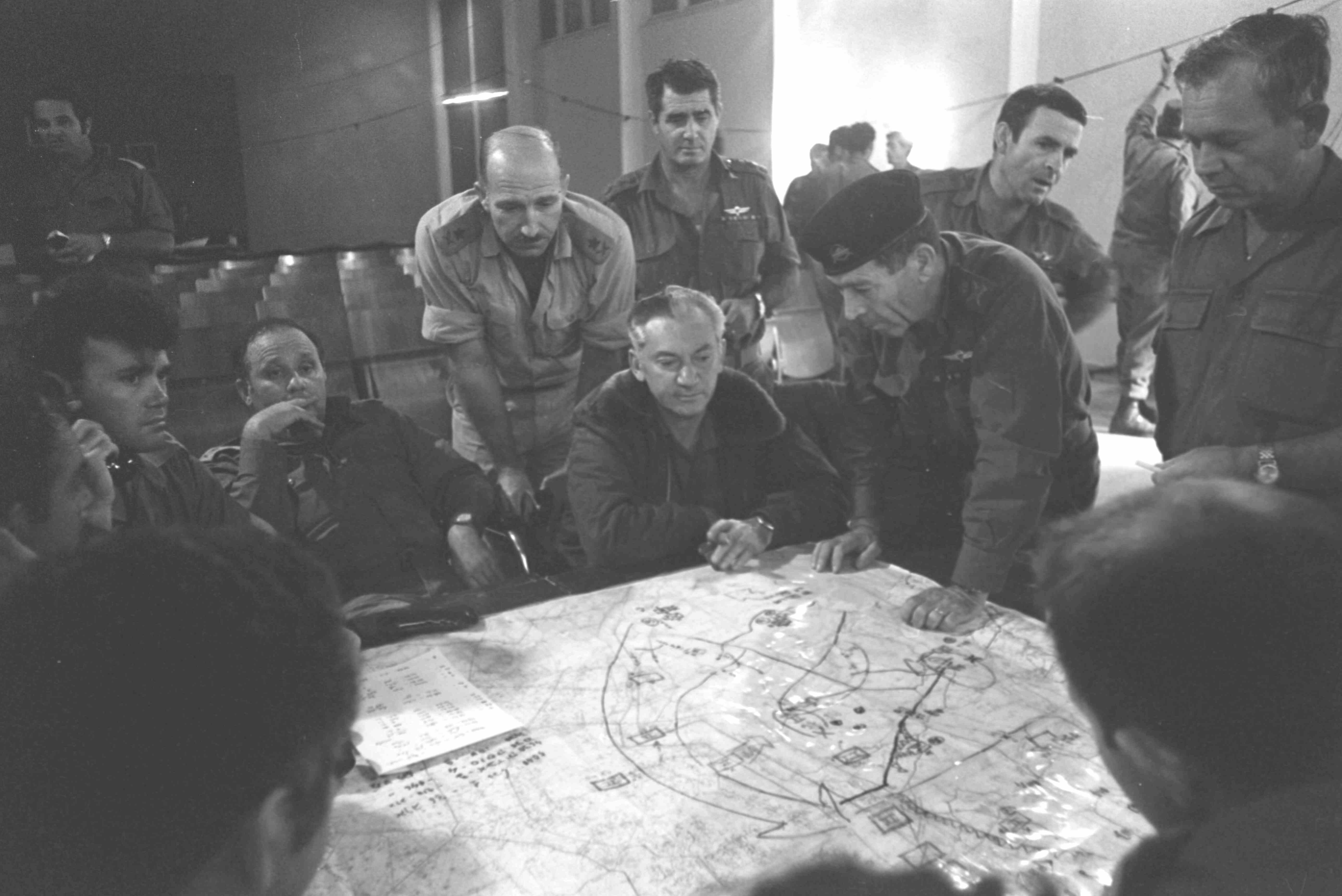
Haim Bar-Lev, seated center, 17 October 1973

=== Six-Day War and War of Attrition ===
The Bar Lev Line evolved from a group of rudimentary fortifications placed along the canal line. In response to Egyptian artillery bombardments during the War of Attrition, Israel developed the fortifications into an elaborate defense system spanning 150 km (93 mi) along Suez Canal, with the exception of the Great Bitter Lake (where a canal crossing was unlikely due to the width of the lake). The Bar Lev Line was designed to defend against any major Egyptian assault across the canal, and was expected to function as a "graveyard for Egyptian troops".

=== Cost, construction, and materials ===
The line, costing around $300 million in 1973, was named after Israeli Chief of Staff Haim Bar-Lev. The line was built at the Suez Canal, a unique water barrier that Moshe Dayan described as "one of the best anti-tank ditches in the world." The line incorporated a massive, continuous sand wall lining the entire canal, and was supported by a concrete wall. The sand wall, which varied in height from 20–25 metres (66–82 ft), was inclined at an angle of 45–65 degrees. The sand wall and its concrete support prevented any armored or amphibious units from landing on the east bank of the Suez Canal without prior engineering preparations. Israeli planners estimated it would take at least 24 hours, probably a full 48 hours for the Egyptians to breach the sand wall and establish a bridge across the canal.

Immediately behind this sand wall was the front line of Israeli fortifications. After the War of Attrition, there were 22 forts, which incorporated 35 strongpoints. The forts were designed to be manned by a platoon. The strongpoints, which were built several stories into the sand, were on average situated less than 5 km (3 mi) from each other, but at likely crossing points they were less than 900 metres (3,000 ft) apart. The strongpoints incorporated trenches, minefields, barbed wire and a sand embankment. Major strongpoints had up to 26 bunkers with medium and heavy machineguns, 24 troop shelters, six mortar positions, four bunkers housing anti-aircraft weapons, and three firing positions for tanks. The strongpoints were surrounded by nearly fifteen circles of barbed wire and minefields to a depth of 200 metres (660 ft). A strongpoint's perimeter averaged 200–350 metres (660–1,150 ft). The bunkers and shelters provided protection against anything less than a 500 kg bomb, and offered luxuries to the defenders such as air conditioning. Between 500–1,000 metres (1,600–3,300 ft) behind the canal, there were prepared firing positions designed to be occupied by tanks assigned to the support of the strongpoints. Some of the names of the strongpoints were Tasa, Maftzach, Milano, Mezach, Chizayon, Mifreket, Orcal, Budapest (the largest), Nisan, Lituf, Chashiva. In addition, there were eleven strongholds located 5–8 km (3–5 mi) behind the canal, which were built along sandy hills. Each stronghold was designed to hold a company of troops.

To take advantage of the water obstacle, the Israelis installed an underwater pipe system to pump flammable crude oil into the Suez Canal, thereby creating a sheet of flame. Some Israeli sources claim the system was unreliable and only a few of the taps were operational. Nevertheless, the Egyptians took this threat seriously and, on the eve of the war, during the late evening of 5 October, teams of Egyptian frogmen blocked the underwater openings with concrete.

== Defensive plans ==
To support the Bar Lev Line, Israel built a well-planned and elaborate system of roads. Three main roads ran north–south. The first was the Lexicon Road (Infantry Road), running along the canal, which allowed the Israelis to move between the fortifications and conduct patrols. The second was the Artillery Road, around 10–12 km (6–7 mi) from the canal. Its name came from the twenty artillery and air defense positions located on it; it also linked armored concentration areas and logistical bases. The Lateral Road (Supply Road), 30 km (19 mi) from the canal, was meant to allow the concentration of Israeli operational reserves which, in case of an Egyptian offensive, would counterattack the main Egyptian assault. A number of other roads running east to west, Quantara Road, Hemingway Road, and Jerusalem Road were designed to facilitate the movement of Israeli troops towards the canal.

The defense of the Sinai depended upon two plans, Dovecote (שׁוֹבָךְ יוֹנִים/Shovakh Yonim) and Rock (סֶלַע/Sela). In both plans, the Israeli General Staff expected the Bar Lev Line to serve as a "stop line" or kav atzira—a defensive line that had to be held at all cost. As noted by an Israeli colonel shortly after the War of Attrition, "The line was created to provide military answers to two basic needs: first, to prevent the possibility of a major Egyptian assault on Sinai with the consequent creation of a bridgehead which could lead to all-out war; and, second, to reduce as much as possible the casualties among the defending troops."

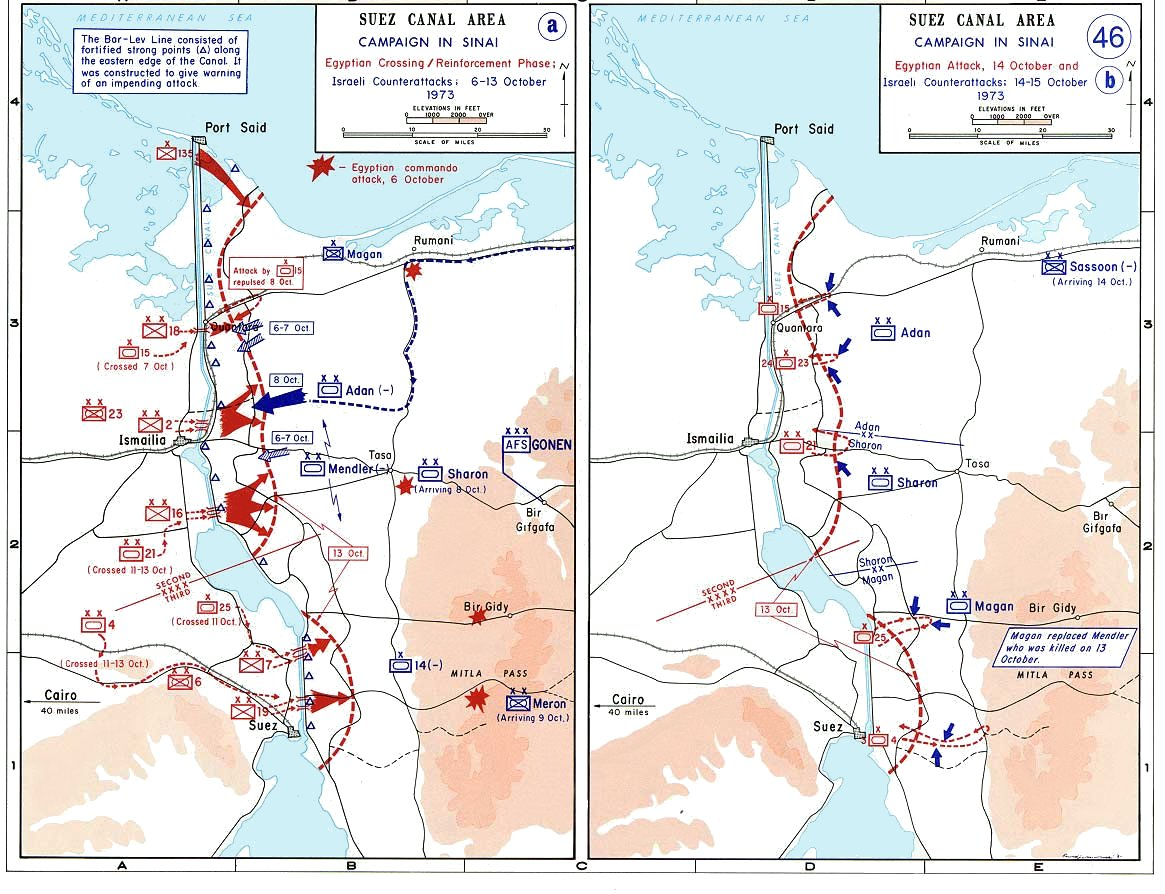
Maps showing the Egyptian offensive and the Israeli counter-offensive on the Suez front. The Bar Lev Line forts are marked on the first map.

Israeli planning was based on a 48-hour advance warning by intelligence services of an impending Egyptian attack. During these 48 hours, the Israeli Air Force (IAF) would assault enemy air defense systems, while Israeli forces deployed as planned. The Israelis expected an Egyptian attack would be defeated by armored brigades supported by the superior IAF.

Dovecote tasked a regular armored division to the defense of the Sinai. The division was supported by an additional tank battalion, twelve infantry companies and seventeen artillery batteries. This gave a total of over 300 tanks, 70 artillery guns and 18,000 troops. These forces, which represented the Sinai garrison, were tasked with the mission of defeating an Egyptian crossing at or near the canal line. It called for around 800 soldiers to man the forward fortifications on the canal line. Meanwhile, along Artillery Road, a brigade of 110 tanks was stationed with the objective of advancing and occupying the firing positions and tanks ramparts along the canal in case of an Egyptian attack. There were two additional armored brigades, one to reinforce the forward brigade, and the other to counterattack the main Egyptian attack.

Should the regular armored division prove incapable of repulsing an Egyptian attack, the Israeli army would activate Rock, mobilizing two reserve armored divisions with support elements; implementation of Rock signified a major war.

=== Israeli skepticism ===
Generals Ariel Sharon and Israel Tal objected to the line and argued that it would not succeed in fending off Egyptian attackers. Sharon said that it would pin down large military formations, which would be sitting ducks for deadly artillery attacks, but the line was completed in spring 1970.

== Yom Kippur War ==
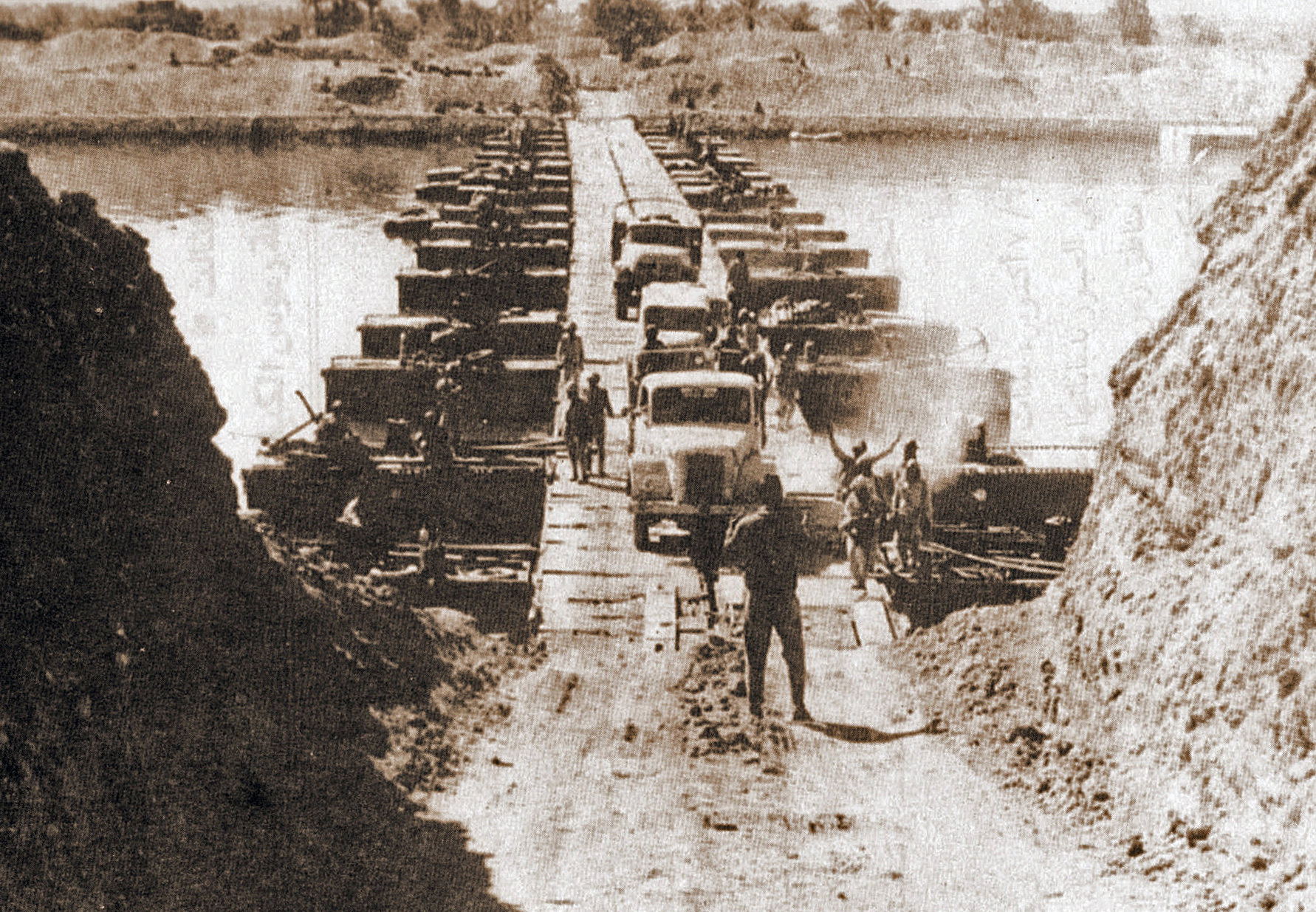
Egyptian forces crossing the Suez Canal

=== Egyptian breach ===
During the Yom Kippur War, the Egyptian army, led by Chief of staff Saad El Shazly, overran the Bar Lev Line in less than two hours due to the element of surprise and overwhelming firepower. To deal with the massive earthen ramparts, the Egyptians used water cannons fashioned from hoses attached to dredging pumps in the canal. Other methods involving explosives, artillery, and bulldozers were too costly in time and required nearly ideal working conditions. In 1971, a young Egyptian officer, Baki Zaki Yousef, suggested a small, light, petrol-fueled pump as the answer to the crossing dilemma. The Egyptian military purchased 300 British-made pumps, five of which could blast 1,500 cubic meters of sand in three hours. In 1972, it acquired 150 more powerful German pumps driven by small gas turbines. A combination of two German or three British pumps would cut the breaching time down to two hours. These cannons pumped out powerful jets of water, creating 81 breaches in the line and removing three million cubic metres of packed dirt on the first day of the war.

The Egyptians assaulted the Bar Lev Line with two field armies and forces from Port Said and the Red Sea Military District. The Second Field Army covered the area from north of Qantara to south of Deversoir, while the Third Field Army was responsible for the area from Bitter Lakes to south of Port Tawfiq.

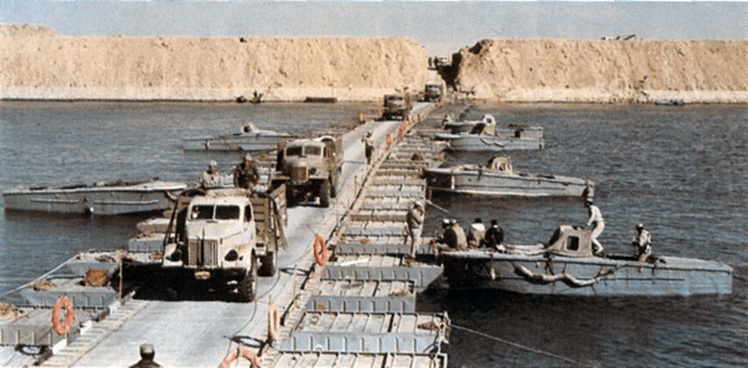
Egyptian vehicles crossing the Suez Canal in the Sinai

The Egyptians began their simultaneous air and artillery attacks with 250 Egyptian Air Force planes attacking their assigned targets accurately in Sinai. Meanwhile, 2,000 artillery pieces opened massive fire against all the strong points along the Bar Lev Line, a barrage that lasted 53 minutes and dropped 10,500 shells in the first minute alone, or 175 shells per second.

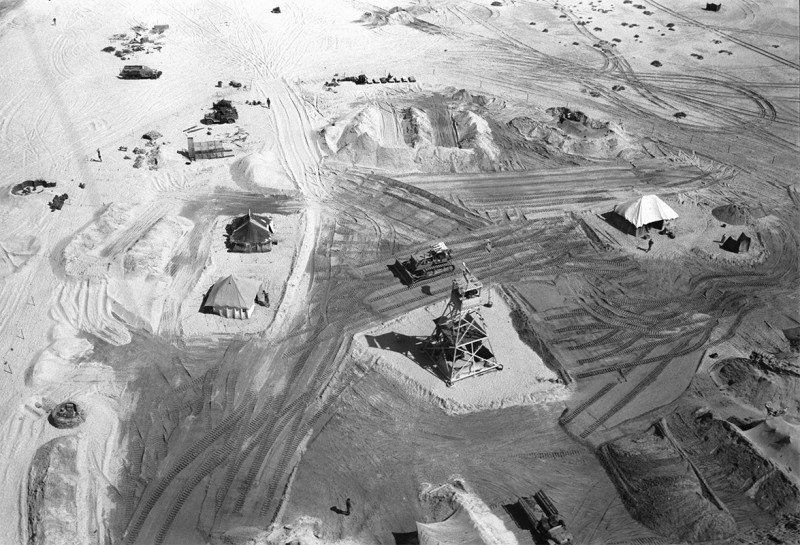
Budapest fortress January 1973

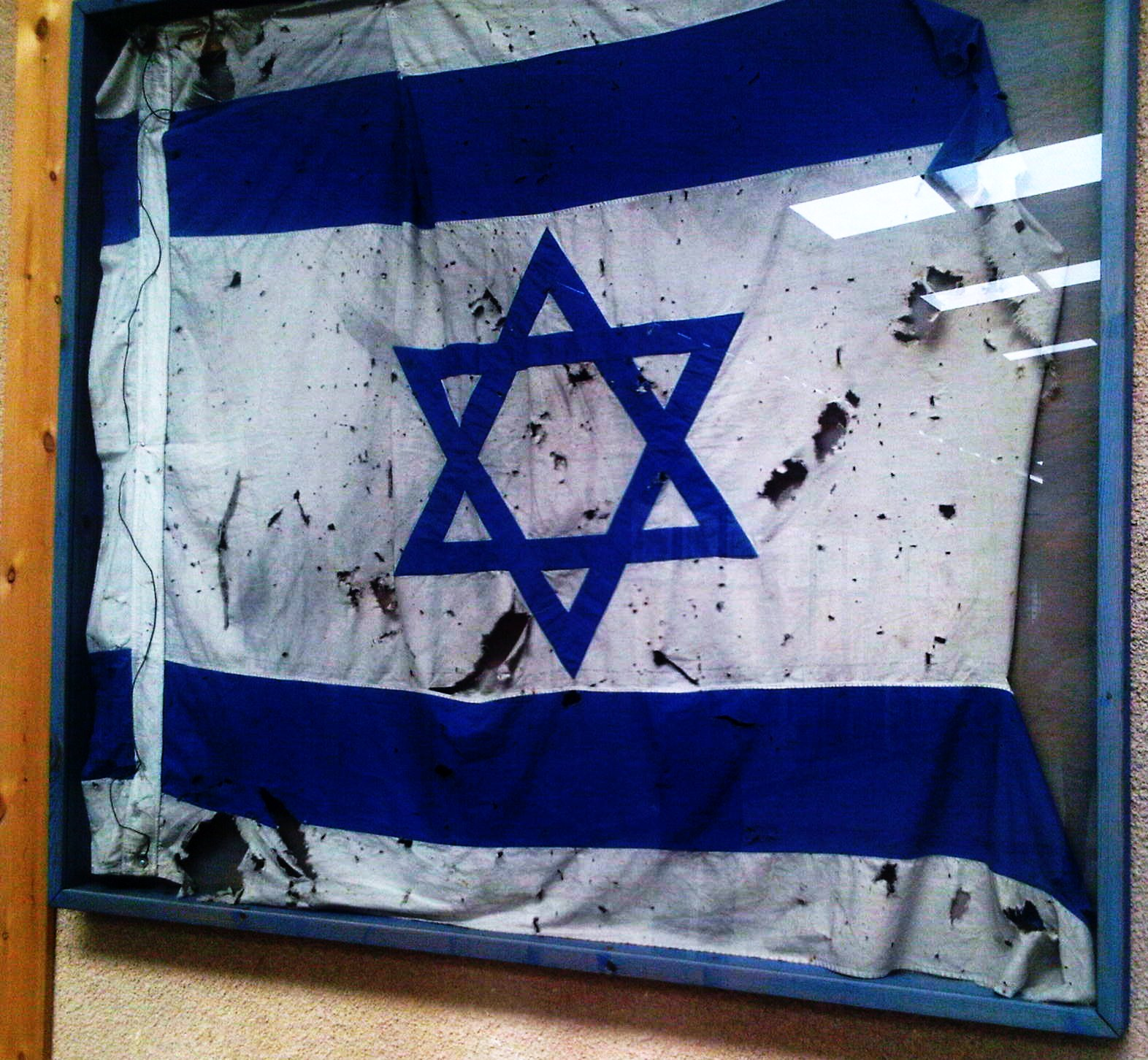
Israeli flag flown at Bar Lev Line Fort Budapest throughout the Yom Kippur War

Within the first hour of the war, the Egyptian engineering corps tackled the sand barrier. Seventy engineer groups, each one responsible for opening a single passage, worked from wooden boats. With hoses attached to water pumps, they began attacking the sand obstacle. Many breaches occurred within two to three hours of the start of operations—according to schedule; however, engineers at several places experienced unexpected problems. The sand from the breached openings in the barrier was reduced to mud, which was one meter deep in some areas. This problem required that the engineers emplace floors of wood, rails, stone, sandbags, steel plates, or metal nets for the passage of heavy vehicles. The Third Army, in particular, had difficulty in its sector. There, the clay proved resistant to high-water pressure and, consequently, the engineers experienced delays in their breaching. Engineers in the Second Army completed the erection of their bridges and ferries within nine hours, whereas the Third Army needed more than sixteen hours.

=== Israeli defense ===
Of the 441 Israeli soldiers in 16 forts on the Bar Lev Line at the start of the war, 126 were killed and 161 captured. Only Budapest, to the north of the line near the Mediterranean city of Port Said, held out for the duration of the war, while all the others were overrun.

== Criticism ==
In his book The Yom Kippur War: The Epic Encounter That Transformed the Middle East, historian Abraham Rabinovich posits that the Bar Lev line was a blunder—too lightly manned to be an effective defensive line and too heavily manned to be an expendable tripwire. Moreover, it can be argued that the concept of the line was counter-intuitive to the strengths of Israeli battle tactics, which, at their core, relied on agile mobile forces moving rapidly through the battlefield rather than utilizing a heavy reliance on fixed defenses.

== See also ==
- Maginot Line, a chain of French fortifications that was bypassed by the Germans during World War II
- Closure of the Suez Canal (1967–1975), a phase of the Arab–Israeli conflict
