= Anti-tank trench =

Defensive construction in warfare

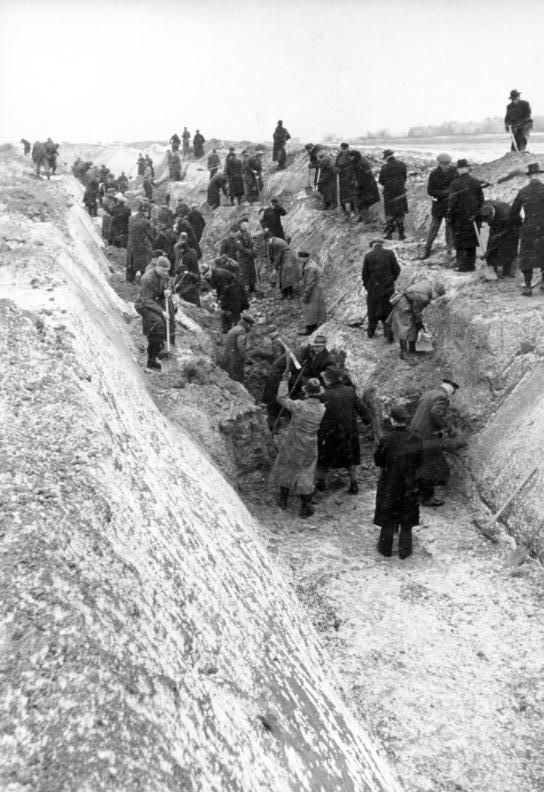
Men of the Volkssturm-militia digging an anti-tank ditch during the Battle of Berlin at the outskirts of the city (February 1945)

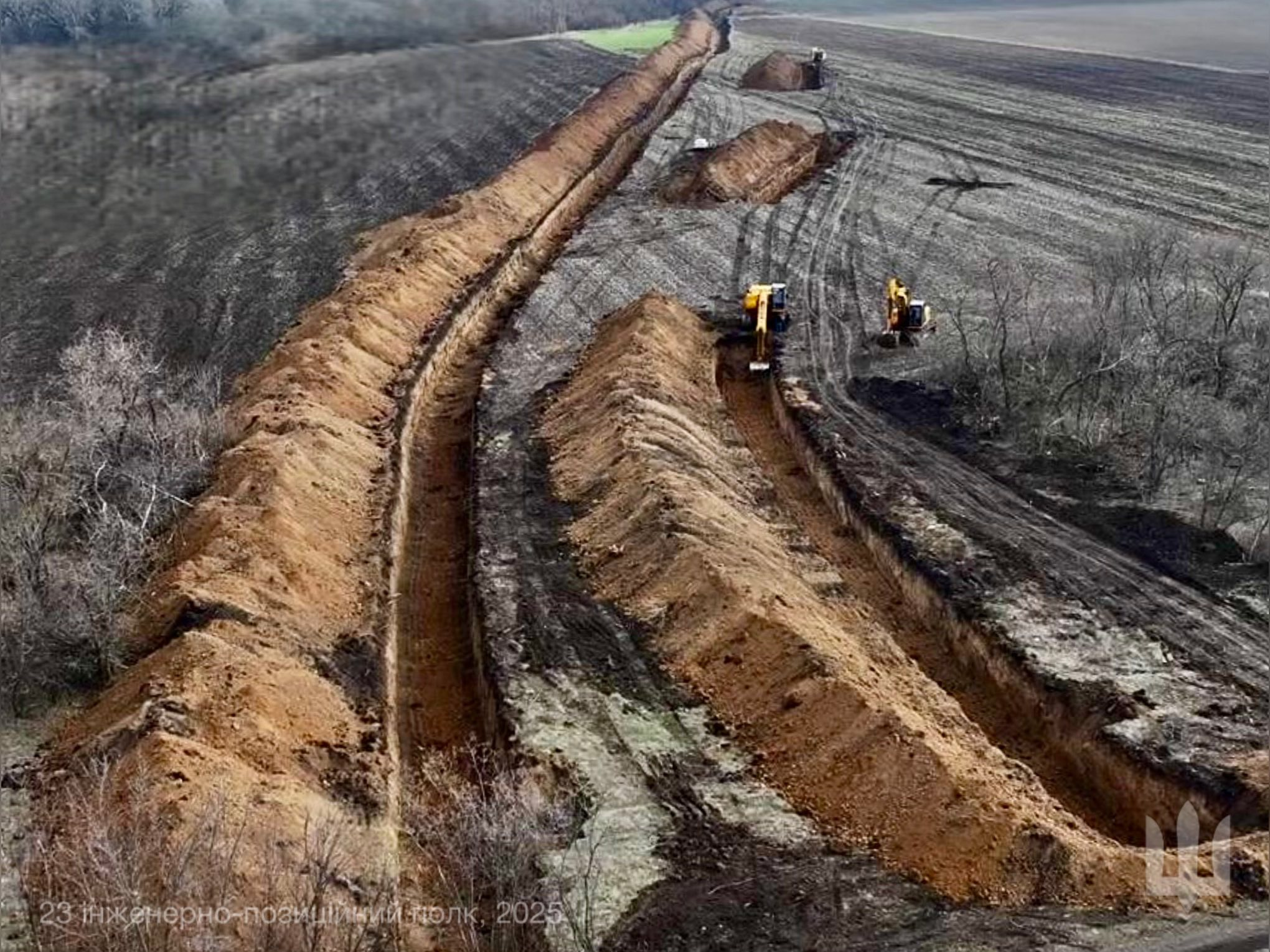
Construction of double anti-tank ditches in Ukraine in 2025

Anti-tank trenches, also called anti-tank ditches, are artificial and natural excavations dug into the ground, that aim to slow the advance of enemy tanks. An anti-tank ditch has to be wide enough and deep enough, for a tank to get stuck in it, preventing the vehicle from crossing properly. Armies have been known to disguise anti-tank ditches or place mines in them to more effectively disable enemy tanks.

== History ==
They were first used during World War I by German forces in an effort to protect their trenches against the newly developed British and French tanks.

== Construction ==
According to the United States Army, there are several methods by which combat engineers can dig an anti-tank ditch on the battlefield. Using only hand tools, a platoon of soldiers can dig a triangular-shaped ditch 100 feet (30 m) long, 12 feet (3.7 m) wide and 6 feet (1.8 m) deep in seven and a half hours; a trapezoidal-shaped ditch of similar dimensions would take fourteen hours. Equipping the platoon with a 3/4-cubic-yard (0.57 m^{3}) power shovel cuts these digging times to four and a half hours and nine hours respectively. Alternatively, a squad of soldiers with a power auger and sufficient demolition charges can blast a ditch 100 yards (90 m) long, 30 feet (9 m) wide and 12 feet (3.7 m) deep in twelve hours.

== Counter techniques ==
Anti-tank trenches can be defeated in 2 key ways. The first way involves the creation of a temporary pathway on which the tank can cross.This can be through the use of a fascine. Additionally, anti-tank ditches can also be crossed by building bridges over them or utilizing AVLB's. The second way anti-tank ditches may be counter-acted is through their destruction. This can be the use of explosives on each side of the ditch, to make inclines suitable for the tank or the complete filling of the trench with dirt.

== See also ==
- Anti-tank warfare
- Anti-tank obstacles
