= Bloodletting (disambiguation) =

Bloodletting is a formerly common medical procedure now generally abandoned.

Bloodletting may also refer to:

== Arts, entertainment and media ==
=== Film and television ===
- Bloodletting (film), a 1997 American direct-to-video horror film
- "Bloodletting" (The Walking Dead), an episode of the television series The Walking Dead

=== Literature ===
- Bloodletting Press, small publishing house focused on horror fiction
- Bloodletting & Miraculous Cures, short story collection by Vincent Lam

=== Music ===
- Bloodletting (Concrete Blonde album), album by Concrete Blonde
- Bloodletting (Overkill album), album by Overkill
- Bloodletting (Boxer album), an album by the rock band Boxer in 1976
- Bloodlet, American metalcore band

== Other uses ==
- Bloodletting in Mesoamerica, ritualized self-cutting or piercing of an individual's body that served a number of ideological and cultural functions within ancient Mesoamerican societies
- Bait and bleed, military strategy
- Dhabihah, method to slaughter animals according to Islamic law by bloodletting
- Exsanguination, blood loss, to a degree sufficient to cause death in either animals or humans
- Kashrut (kosher), method to slaughter animals according to Judaic law by bloodletting
