= Obstacles to troop movement =

Obstacles to troop movement represent either natural, human habitat originated, constructed, concealed obstacles, or obstructive impediments to movement of military troops and their vehicles, or to their visibility. By impeding strategic, operational or tactical manoeuvre, the obstacle represents an added barrier between opposing combat forces, and therefore prevent achievement of objectives and goals specified in the operational planning schedule. The constructed obstacles are used as an aid to defending a position or area as part of the general defensive plan of the commander. The obstacles that originate from the human habitat can be converted by troops into constructed obstacles by either performing additional construction, or executing demolitions to obstruct movement over the transport network, to create a choke point, or to deny traversing of an area to the enemy. The natural obstacles can be used defensively by securing a more difficult to breach defensive position by for example securing a flank on terrain that is deemed impossible to traverse, thus denying the enemy an ability to close into combat range of direct fire weapons.

== Role of obstacles ==
Obstacles are used in combat operations to create choke points, deny mobility corridors and avenue of approach to positions, to enhance field of fire for direct fire weapons, or to protect key tactical terrain features to the enemy.

Obstacles may be set up on land, in the water, or in the air to damage enemy forces, to impede their movement, to delay or restrain their actions, or to force them to move in a favorable direction for friendly troops.

Obstacles can be erected both in advance and during combat; they can be created in the support zone, on the approaches to defensive lines, in front of their front edge and in the depth of tactical and operational defense zones. Construction of obstacles is subject to the intended plan of the battle (operation) and is closely coordinated with the fire system and strikes of the means of fire, taking into account the maneuvering of their forces.

For all obstacles reporting documentation is drawn up in the prescribed form; during the change of troops the erected obstacles are handed over by act with the reporting documents attached to it.

== History ==
It is established that various types of non-explosive obstacles were used for military purposes at the dawn of human civilization. As a rule, they included earthen ramparts, stone walls, wooden palisades, ditches, wolf pits, forest obstacles and abatis, abatis lines and others. For example, in the defensive constructions of Kievan Rus' the height of earthen shafts reached 19.7–26.2 feet (6–8 meters) and 52.5–55.8 (16–17 meters) in width. In the system of fortifications of ancient Novgorod in 12th century there were two lines of obstacles at once. To defend the state borders, powerful systems of fortifications (abatis lines), combining fortifications and obstacles, were arranged.

Beginning in the 18th century, propellant (fougasse) began to be used in the construction of obstacles, and from the second half of the 19th century – high explosives. In 1769 at Khotyn Russian mine-sinkers for the first time used floating mine-explosive means. A little later, in 1776 similar devices were used during the American Revolutionary War. Alexander Suvorov's troops achieved high skill, using obstacles against the Turks at Girsov and on the approaches to Kherson in 1787. Mikhail Kutuzov used the construction of obstacles in the Battle of Borodino and in the Battle of Tarutino in 1812. During the siege of Sevastopol in 1854–1855 Russian sappers first used galvanic and percussion-fire mines, as well as – shell and stone fougasses. During the Russo-Turkish War in 1877–1878 Russian military engineers continued to develop the practice of using stone fougasses and mine underwater obstacles. In 1848 they developed the then advanced designs of guided antipersonnel mines and fougasses; in 1894 Russian designers created the first non-recoverable antipersonnel mine, and around the same time the Sushinsky shrapnel shell fougasse appeared.

In 1904 during the siege of Port Arthur Russian troops were the first to use anti-personnel mines and explosive charges remotely initiated electrically. As a rule, in those days, the front lines of Russian explosive obstacles consisted of self-acting mines, about 656 feet 2 inches (200 meters) behind them were exposed fougasses controlled by wire. It was also the first time in the world when electric wire obstacles were used in combat situations: Lieutenant N. V. Krotkov (1875–1942) proposed to install the so-called electric fences – smooth wire fixed on wooden stakes with porcelain insulators through which high voltage electric current was passed. During an assault on Mount High on a position equipped by them on the night of Nov. 26, 1904 on the wire killed by Russian data, up to 150 Japanese soldiers.

During World War I the first designs of anti-tank mines were immediately developed as armored weapons and vehicles appeared on the battlefield. The tactic of creating continuous strips of wire obstacles became widespread; on the Eastern front, in addition to them, antipersonnel mines and object delayed-action mines were especially widely used. To strengthen the fortresses (Ivangorod, Osowiec, Brest-Litovsk, Novogeorgievsk, etc.) water obstacles in the form of flooding and swamping of the area were used. Long water obstacles were also created on the tributaries of the Pripyat River. In 1916, to protect London, Venice and Paris, anti-aircraft barrages were organized with the help of aerostats. During the war Russian military engineers – Dragomirov, Gritskevich, Revensky – proposed a number of original designs of various mines, which were used in obstacle systems of different purposes.

The experience of World War II greatly enriched the practice of obstacle systems, which on land were used in all types of combat operations. In addition, obstacles were actively used in the organization of air defense and coastal defense systems. On mines, which were widely used by the Soviet partisans, the Nazi troops and their allies suffered huge losses (see article Soviet partisans). During the Battle of Moscow the Soviets first resorted to the tactic of mobile mining, which was later successfully used many times to counteract Wehrmacht armored wedges. Since 1943 Soviet mobile obstacle units officially became an element of combat order and operational structure of troops. Air obstacles were used in the air defense systems of Leningrad, Moscow and other industrial centers.

In the post-war period the functional role of obstacles in combined arms combat and operations continued to increase. The theoretical basis for the use of military obstacles was improved under the influence of the rapid development of means to overcome obstacles and barriers. In armed forces of a number of states on the armament were adopted complexes of remote mining the terrain and water areas by means of aviation technology, rocket arms, artillery and multiple rocket launchers. Since the 1980s the tendency to combine remotely installed mine obstacles with complexes of reconnaissance-signaling sensors has been revealed.

== Types of obstacles ==
=== Natural obstacles ===
Natural obstacles are represented by those terrain features that for which few troops and their vehicles have capability to traverse. They include water obstacles, or areas of poor drainage such as lakes, rivers, swamps and marshes. The former two can be crossed by amphibious vehicles capable of swimming, or vehicles capable of deep wading after preparation, or by constructing a water crossing, and thus creating an easily targeted choke point. Soil and rock can also represent mobility obstacles if the soil is too soft and unable to support the weight of the military vehicles, or the terrain is fractured by cliffs, or large boulders that make organised movement impossible. While soft soil is relative to vehicle ground pressure, there is little that can be done to negotiate very rocky terrain or cliffs except by using specially trained light infantry troops. Vegetation such as jungles or dense forests can also represent obstacles to movement, in some cases even to light infantry troops. Some natural obstacles can be a result of climatic or soil activity such as deep snow that by covering all terrain makes safe traversing difficult and slow, or landslides that may create an obstruction suddenly despite previously clear route reconnaissance report.

=== Habitat obstacles ===
While human habitat had, since early construction of roads, sought to create ways of negotiating terrain faster, the human activity on the landscape can create obstacles in its own right. Artificial lakes and ponds, canals, and areas of agricultural cultivation, particularly those that are water-intensive such as rice-paddy fields create obstacles often more difficult than the natural equivalents. Mining activity creates quarries, and the building of roads, rail roads and dams also involve construction of cuts and fills. Seeded tree-line windbreaks, hedgerows, stone walls and plantation forests also disrupt mobility, particularly of vehicles. Lastly the urban areas in themselves represent obstacles by offering elevated firing positions and canyon-like choke points by forcing the opponent to advance through the streets.

=== Constructed obstacles ===
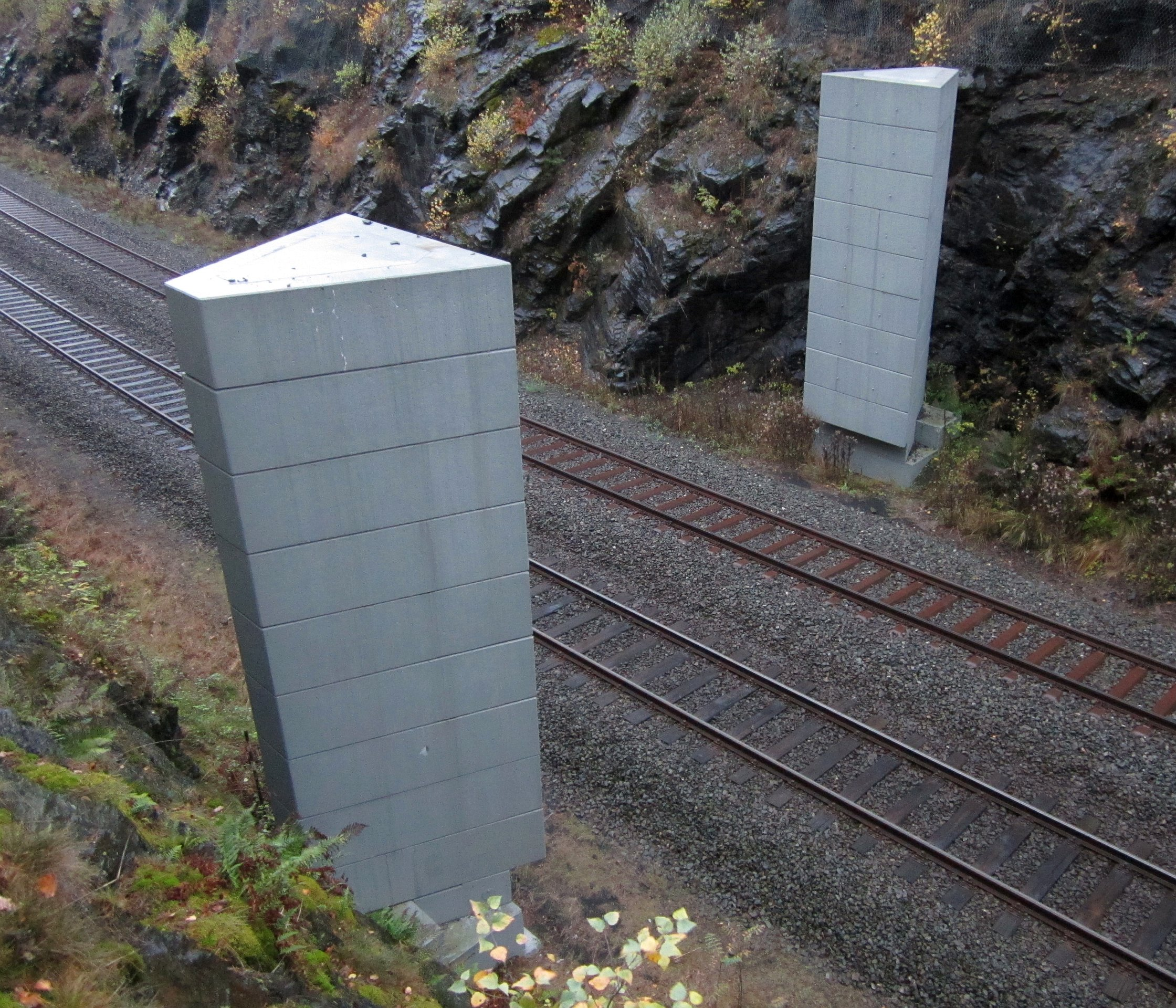
Obstacle for train movement, reinforced concrete.

Constructed obstacles are those prepared by military engineering troops, often combat engineers, by either using materials to construct impediments to foot and vehicle-borne troops, or by using demolition methods, or excavation such as an abatis, to create obstacles from natural materials and terrain in specific location in accordance with the overall plan of operations. Sometimes such obstacles can be created intentionally or unintentionally through effects of artillery fire cratering. Buildings demolished due to combat or aerial bombing become very effective obstacles as rubble represents difficult to negotiate and irregular piles of building materials.

=== Concealed obstacles ===
Concealed obstacles are used with the intention of not only preventing movement of enemy troops, but also causing casualties during attempted movement. Although one of the oldest forms of obstacle use, this became far deadlier with the invention of the mine warfare, and more so with air-delivered scattered submunition minelets that can create an instant minefield.

=== Obstructive obstacles ===
Obstructive obstacles are used primarily to deny terrain visibility to the enemy, thus creating uncertainty in targeting friendly troops. Although ancient in use as tar smoke pots, modern smoke screens are temporary and are used as a tactical measure during manoeuvring, often when a unit is performing a position change.

=== Russian classification ===
Obstacle systems are commonly classified in a number of different ways. Some types of obstacles can be false, in which case they tend to mimic combat obstacles and are used in conjunction with real ones.

By scale of application:

- Tactical, which are created by troops and engineer units attached to them in the divisional defense zone according to the plans of formations; they include anti-tank and anti-personnel minefields, non-explosive obstacles, nodes of tactical obstacles, artificial structures prepared for destruction and sections of transport routes; the build-up and strengthening of tactical obstacles can be carried out by mobile barrage squads (MBS);
- Operational, which are erected according to the plan of the command of the front or army to ensure the fulfillment of tasks in the most important directions, determining the stability of the defense as a whole; as a rule, they include road obstacles on major highways (circuitous and frontal), transport hubs, stripes and areas of obstacles, mine lines, flood zones and important objects prepared for destruction; operational obstacles are created by the engineering forces of the front or army, in some cases involving forces of division; Operational barriers are created by the engineering armies of the front or the army, in some cases involving the forces of divisions, their increase can be organized by MBSs and reserves of the army, the front or the main command in the theater, as well as – by remote mining the area by air and artillery.

By location:

- Land (anti-tank, anti-personnel, mixed, anti-vehicle, anti-submersible and water obstacles);
- Naval (mines, nets, booms or combined);
- Airborne (anti-submarine and anti-rotary mines, cable and net obstacles raised by barrage balloons, etc.).

By nature of impact:

- Explosive (mine-explosive, nuclear-explosive, etc.);
- Electrified (high tension wire, mesh, or cable obstacles);
- Non-explosive made of improvised and construction materials (earth, wood, snow, concrete, metal, etc.) or of industrially produced structural elements (barbed wire, bollards, anti-tank hedgehog, nets, etc.);
- Combined (various combinations of explosive, non-explosive and electrified).

By purpose:

- Cut-offs are created in the defense zones of troops to slow or stop the enemy offensive or to force him to change direction of movement,
- Disturbing are created without a scheme and, as a rule, in a closed way to restrain enemy actions, slow down his pace of movement and stop him from using certain territories in his interests,
- Security mines are created without a scheme in an open way from a limited number of anti-tank mines for the purpose of direct protection of troops to strengthen the terrain in front of their positions and between them.

== Obstacle negotiation ==
Ground troops prefer to deal with physical obstacles by circumventing them as rapidly as possible, thus avoiding becoming stationary targets to the enemy direct and indirect fire weapons, and aircraft. Where this is not possible, in modern warfare the most expedient measures taken against constructed or urban obstacles are to either use armoured vehicles, preferably tanks, to remove the obstacle, or to demolish them by firing High Explosive munitions at them. Where combat engineers are present, they can perform this using their specialist skills and tools or vehicles. In the case of natural obstacles, specialist engineering equipment is usually required to negotiate the obstacle, commonly bridging or pontoons. The solution to obstacle bridging had at the strategic level created new forms of warfare and employment of troops in the amphibious operations, and later the airborne operations. At the operational level the use of helicopters in airmobile operations offers a vertical option to negotiating obstacles, often of considerable extent such as mountain passes or extensive areas of impossible vegetation.

== See also ==
- Engineer reconnaissance
- Route reconnaissance
- Military tactics
- Types of military tactics
- Types of military operations
- Types of military strategies
