= Mobile barrage squad =

Mobile barrages squad is an element of a combat or operational order in the form of a temporary military formation, which is created from units of engineering troops and army aviation.

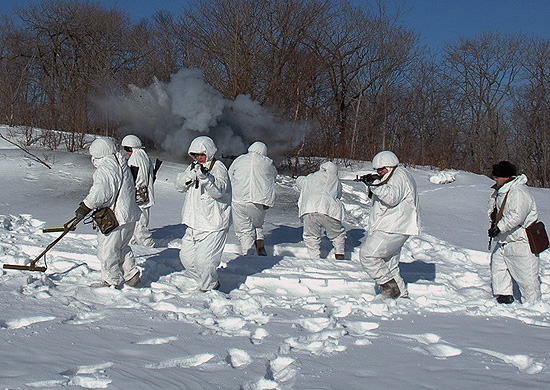
Engineer-sapper units of the Western Military District of the Armed Forces of the Russian Federation (2016)

The abbreviation for the temporary formation of troops or forces used in service documents is MBS. The main purpose of MBS is to set up mine blast barrages during combat and to destroy transport infrastructure on behalf of friendly forces. Until July 1943 they were referred to simply as a barrage squad.

== History ==
The theoretical foundation for the practical application of MBS was laid in the work "Разрушения и заграждения" (1931) by the Soviet military engineer Dmitry Karbyshev.

During the Second World War (1939 - 1945), and especially the Eastern Front (1941 - 1945), wide use in all types of combat found mines and explosive barrages. For their arrangement in the Battle of Moscow, the Soviet troops for the first time in 1941 were used barrage squads, later called mobile barrage squads, which subsequently were successfully used in other operations of the Red Army of the Soviet Union.

After the Battle of Kursk (1943) on the basis of the experience gained, it was concluded that the army command needed a permanent specialized reserve of engineering units, which would have the means of mechanization of mines, large quantities of mines and explosives of various types. As a consequence, the MBS became a mandatory element of operational structure of the Soviet troops, and in 1942 - 1943 the tactics of MBS in the offensive and defensive were practiced. During the Eastern Front, the Red Army expended more than 70,000,000 different mines, including about 30,000,000 anti-tank mines.

== Basic provisions ==
The composition and equipment of a squad is determined by its objectives in combat or an operation, the availability of available forces and equipment, the composition of the enemy's troops, and the conditions on the ground. When setting a mission, the MBS receives data on the area of location, movement routes, mine lines, and possible courses of action (bands).

On defense, the MBS holds behind the first echelon of its troops in the most likely direction of the enemy's main strike in full readiness to move out to the breakout areas. The primary purpose of the MBS in defensive operations is considered to be:

- Rapid erection of mines and explosive barrages and the organization of destruction on the directions of the enemy's breakthrough into the depths of the defense, in the areas of landing of marines and the like;
- Covering joints and flanks of their troops with engineering barrages, as well as deployment points for counterattacks and counterstrikes;
- Increasing the density of barrages in critical areas of first-echelon unit defense.

On the offensive, the MBS follows the first echelon of troops in readiness to set up barriers at the mines indicated to it.

On the offensive, the tasks of the MBS are usually:

- Organizing roadblocks in likely directions of enemy counterattacks and counterattacks;
- Covering the flanks of the strike groups and the entry points of the second echelons with engineering barrages;
- Setting up barrages in first-echelon units while securing them in captured positions.

An MBS formation can be established not only in the ground forces, but also to solve certain tasks within other branches of the armed forces and branches of the military. For example, in the Navy, the tasks of barrages on the high seas are performed by barrage ship units. In the Strategic Rocket Forces of Russia, units are formed to cover approaches to the facilities of the position area, block enemy reconnaissance groups and landing zones of marines. While conventional units and formations usually organize one MBS, troops defending a stretch of coastline create an additional MBS with watercraft or aircraft for placing anti-landing mines in the water. In military formations, two or three MBSs are created, one of which is equipped with helicopter vehicles.

The organizational structure of the armies of NATO member states does not provide for the deployment and use of MBS.

== See also ==
- Fougasse

== Bibliography ==
- Руббо Д., Григорьев Б. Подвижные отряды заграждений в битве под Москвой // Армейский сборник : Научно-методический журнал МО РФ. — М.: Редакционно-издательский центр МО РФ, 2016. — No. 11. — p. 25. — ISSN 1560-036X.
