= U.S. military doctrine for reconnaissance =

The United States armed forces classify reconnaissance missions as "close" or "short-range"; "distant" or "medium-range"; and "deep" or "long-range".

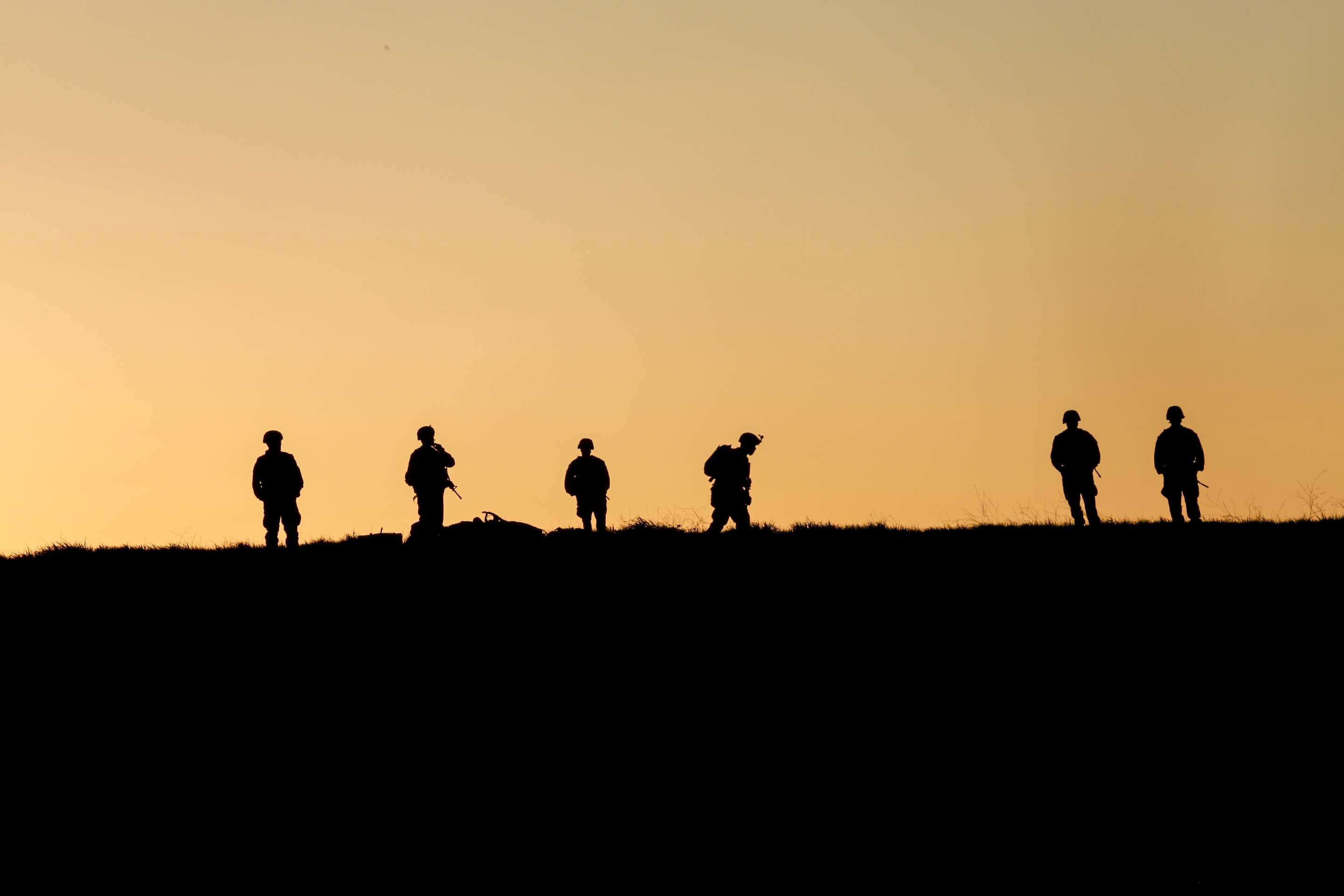
US Marines on reconnaissance patrol during a military exercise

== Depth of penetration ==
Reconnaissance missions, within the scope of the battlespace, are characterized by the depth of penetration required, in terms of time, risk coordination, and support requirements. Information is gathered by commanders at all echelons and is used to prevent surprise, permit the timely maneuver of ground forces, and to facilitate the prompt and effective use of supporting arms.

Depth of reconnaissance in relation to the battlespace. FEBA—Forward Edge of Battle Area FSCL—Fire Support Coordination Line

=== Close ===
Military commanders use forward platoon and company-sized elements of their own organic forces, to perform close reconnaissance ("short-range" reconnaissance), such as: the recon/scout platoons in infantry battalions; reconnaissance platoons in armored regiments/battalions; or "intelligence, surveillance, target acquisition, reconnaissance" (ISTAR) companies that are organic to intelligence brigades/battalions.

These mission normally are conducted in the area between the forward positions to the rear, extending forward of the "Forward Edge of the Battle Area" (FEBA) to the "Fire Support Coordination Line" (FSCL). This area is usually in the commander's Area of operation (AO). It is directed toward determining the location, composition, disposition, capabilities, and activities of enemy committed forces. Close reconnaissance covers the ground between the forward positions that are within the FEBA, to the rear of the zone covered by 'distant' (or medium) reconnaissance assets.

=== Distant ===
The units that provide distant reconnaissance (or known as "medium" reconnaissance) capabilities are usually organic to, or attached to regimental/brigade, division (military)-level, corps-level commands. It is usually directed toward determining location, disposition, composition, movement of supporting arms (i.e. artillery emplacement), and the reserve elements of the enemy committed forces. Distant reconnaissance is conducted between the FEBA, beyond the FSCL, to the rear of the commander's area of influence. Dedicated scouts serving with infantry, tank, artillery, engineer, or logistics units will generally position themselves about 5 kilometres (3.1 mi) in advance of the forward units where possible.

Modern-day commanders have units such as the U.S. Marine Corps Scout Sniper and Light Armored Reconnaissance units, or similar, at their disposal. Light armor such as Armored personnel carriers and light fast vehicles (similar to Sandrails) such as the Light Strike Vehicle are used with reconnaissance (scouting) units for much added armored protection, firepower, speed and mobility; to include, excellent communications, procurement of short- and long-range (remote) sensors, such as thermal imagery, ground surveillance radar and seismic sensors, [and if...] in range of the artillery fan, they have the much needed indirect fire support, when the need arises. In effect, these units are often replicate miniature combined-arms task forces (or battlegroups).

=== Deep ===
At the highest command level of a committed force or component (the division, corps, or field army-level), the force-level reconnaissance is employed to perform deep reconnaissance (or "long-range surveillance"), which is conducted beyond the force (or component) commander's area of influence to the limits of the area of interest (i.e. the geographical area from which information and intelligence are required to execute successful tactical operations, and to plan for future operations). Deep reconnaissance is oriented toward determining the location, composition, disposition, and movement of enemy reinforcements, combat support, and combat service support units, in order to shape and describe the battlespace.

While almost every front-line military unit is sometimes assigned to do limited patrolling, or surveillance, of one kind or another, this kind of stealthy scouting—far from friendly forward operating bases—is a particularly dangerous mission. Scouting specialist, or reconnaissance operators, may protrude as far as 25–50 kilometres (16–31 mi) forward of the FSCL. In practice, reconnaissance or scouting platoons, typically of 20–40 men (4–6 men per squad/team), can probe beyond the FEBA, usually in means of 190–320 kilometres (120–200 mi) from any friendly ground forces, however, this extreme distance excludes any advantages of operating under the supporting arms fan; such as naval gunfire or artillery support, but are not limited to close air support.

In the United States Army, some brigades and divisions have separated, and structured into Long-Range Surveillance (LRS) units, which can go deeper beyond the front line; in which, the units are reorganizes into a Brigade combat team model with enhanced reconnaissance. As of 2007, however, scout specialists were being removed from some brigades, such as the Stryker Brigade.

== See also ==
- Joint Functional Component Command for Intelligence, Surveillance and Reconnaissance
