= Confidence-building defense =

Military school of thought

Confidence-building defense (German: Vertrauensbildende Verteidigung) is a military school of thought developed in the 1980s focused on conventional defense, with the founding purpose of defusing the East-West confrontation and was later applied to other regions of military tension and conflict.

== Concept ==
The fundamental military operational and structural concept in a Confidence-Building Defense (C-BD) is that a national defense can be optimized by creating a relatively large and lightly armed network force structure specializing in defense preparation and tactics. This network serves as a force multiplier for mobile and heavily armed elements, which have considerable offensive capabilities while operating within the network. Because of the synergy inherent in this arrangement, the nation can reduce the number and unit size of attack-capable maneuver elements.

The Dutch Physicist Egbert Boeker has called this a "spider-in-the-web" approach, suggesting that a spider remains deadly only as long as it operates within the web. It is argued that when national political leadership adopts a C-BD posture, they are no longer compelled to pursue military parity or superiority to other nations. This allows leadership to forego "arms racing" and opens the opportunity to significant disarmament. C-BD structures make efficient use of several historically proven advantages of fighting on one's own prepared territory, thereby enhancing stability between neighboring states despite asymmetry in their military postures. Advantages of confidence-building defense postures include:

- Intimate knowledge of the home terrain allows for pre-engineering multiple defensive positions in likely zones of combat, enabling practiced fields of fire from dispersed sites that cover and "thicken" the battlefield.
- C-BD presents intruding forces with a complex system of diverse elements, namely network and cooperating counter-attack forces, making it difficult for them to adapt their tactics as the battle develops.
- Lines of communication and supply are short, reliable, redundant, and hardened.
- In comparison to invading forces, troops fighting to protect their homeland have the advantage of a very considerable morale boost.
- The structure reduces fear of invasion on the side of (and builds trust with) one's potential adversary while at the same time having flexible and steadfast home protection.
- The home population increasingly believes in the reliability of their national defense.

The benefits that derive from confidence-building defense optimization provide a significant operational margin of security. This margin allows for self-limiting the military structural capacity for large-scale cross-border offensives. A confidence-building military posture signals reassurance to neighboring states that military investments are intended for defense sufficiency rather than domination of regional relations. When a potential adversary also begins to make confidence-building structural changes to their military, the opportunity to achieve mutual changes and disarmament is enhanced. Progressive reduction of cross-border invasion threats through reciprocal confidence-building force restructuring can create a virtuous circle of reinforcement of peaceful relations. Beyond the terrestrial dimension, scholars have considered applying the C-BD spider-in-web-model to sea and air forces. There have been historical reviews of the advantages of strategic and operational defense on battlefields. Furthermore, there have been discussions of the validity of C-BD as a universal principle.

== Origins of the concept ==
By 1980, when the Cold War was 33 years old, there was a broadly-shared perception of increasing conventional military threat at the "central front" of a divided Germany. NATO and the Warsaw Pact (WTO) adopted deep offensive counter-attack formations and operational doctrines to dissuade, deter, and defeat an attack by the other side. In the 1980s, both sides in the Cold War were installing a new generation of nuclear-armed missiles in Europe. Consequently, public concern grew that offensive conventional military preparations and doctrines would make nuclear war more likely. Confidence-building Defense is one of several related concepts developed by European thinkers as "stabilizing" and "non-provocative" alternatives to NATO and WTO doctrines. Other names used to describe this group of ideas are Non-Provocative Defense, Non-Offensive Defense, and Defensive Defense.

Confidence-building defense was conceived and elaborated by Lutz Unterseher as chairman of the European Study Group on Alternative Security Policy (SAS), Bonn, founded in 1980. Following the Cold War, Unterseher, in association with Carl Conetta and Charles Knight, co-directors of the United States–based Project on Defense Alternatives (PDA), applied C-BD principles and structural concepts to the security conditions of other states, pairs of states, and regions, including the Middle East, Eastern Europe, Southern Africa, the former Yugoslavia, and Korea. In 1995 Carl Conetta explored the issue of reconciling C-BD concepts with US global power.

== Investigation and evaluation ==
The basics of the SAS approach – namely the synergetic interaction of mobile intervention with quasi-static web elements – was outlined as early as 1980. It then took about four years to develop a detailed concept for ground troops – with designs for maritime and air forces to follow. The degree of specification of the ground force element was sufficient to render possible meaningful critical investigation and evaluation. Systematic qualitative evaluations were conducted by Egbert Boeker at Amsterdam Free University, Karsten Voigt, a member of the German Bundestag, with his advisory team, and a group of military officers on behalf of the Austrian National Defence Academy (Landesverteidigungsakademie (LVAk)).

All evaluations concluded that the SAS approach offered a viable combination of military efficiency with the potential of defusing the military confrontation in Central Europe: thereby enhancing stability. The validity of these evaluations was broadly supported by computer-based operational research examining "reactive defense" models conducted at the University of the Bundeswehr Munich of the German Armed Forces.

== Political relevance ==
An indication of the political relevance of this school of thought at a critical point in history comes from the American political scientist Matthew Evangelista. He recounts that Andrei A. Kokoshin, a close adviser to Mikhail Gorbachev, was significantly influenced by the concept of C-BD. Unterseher reports that beginning in January 1987, a diplomatic agent of the Kremlin was routinely collecting and transferring SAS open-source documents to Moscow, presumably at the request of researchers at several institutes responsible for preparing material for Gorbachev's consideration. In December 1988, in his historic speech before the UN General Assembly, Gorbachev announced substantial Soviet force reductions in Europe, including significant defensive-restructuring measures for those forces that would remain. This Soviet decision was a momentous event on the road to ending the Cold War.
