= Route reconnaissance =

Route Reconnaissance is the investigation of the operational environment in reconnaissance operations of routes for military use, including methods of reconnoitering and classifying them for other troops. In a k during ll the primary purpose of conducting route reconnaissance is to find and report all enemy forces that can interfere with movement along a route, and to identify the limit of direct-fire range and terrain that dominates the route.

== Route reconnaissance process ==
=== Preparation ===
Route reconnaissance includes creation of reconnaissance overlays to identify land and water features, bridge reconnaissance and classification, road reconnaissance and classification, special terrain reconnaissance such as that used during cross-country movement, at the landing areas, on the inland waterways, or when using footpaths and trails, engineer reconnaissance, and use of military route signs (standard signs, sign lighting, bridge signs).

A significant part of route reconnaissance is the ability to identify choke points that prohibit military traffic by using conversion factors and tables to identify non-standard surfaces or inadequate load bearing in structure. To do so, Military Load Classifications are used for standard vehicles of a given armed force.

=== Execution ===
Route reconnaissance is typically conducted by a foot, horse or vehicle-mounted route reconnaissance patrol, sometimes with aid of aerial reconnaissance aircraft. The patrol would include regular reconnaissance elements and a combat engineering team.

=== Consequences ===
Consequence of little or no route reconnaissance and engineer reconnaissance leads to hurdles in operational mobility and tactical frontal assault, leading to defeat or wipe out as it happened to Pakistan in the Battle of Longewala against India.

== See also ==
- Engineer reconnaissance
- Military tactics
- Obstacles to troop movement
- Types of military tactics
- Types of military operations
- Types of military strategies
