= Engineer reconnaissance =

Military reconnaissance operation

Engineer reconnaissance is the reconnaissance operations performed by combat engineers to enable forward movement of own troops, in war usually over territory previously occupied by the enemy. The activity includes provision of reconnaissance instructions on the intended route for which a commander needs an engineer reconnaissance report, identification of road and bridge symbols, posting of safe transit notices for identified bridge capacities, estimation for time and materials required to effect route repair, and performance of demolition reconnaissance to identify intended enemy demolitions.

Consequence of little or no route reconnaissance and engineer reconnaissance leads to hurdles in operational mobility and tactical frontal assault, leading to defeat or wipe out as it happened to Pakistan in the Battle of Longewala against India.

== See also ==
- Route reconnaissance
- Military tactics
- Obstacles to troop movement
- Types of military tactics
- Types of military operations
- Types of military strategies
