= Reconnaissance =

Military observation of enemy activities

United States Army Rangers from the Regimental Reconnaissance Company in Afghanistan, 2004

In military operations, reconnaissance (/rɪˈkɒnɪsəns/) or scouting is the exploration of an area by military forces to obtain information about enemy forces, the terrain, and civil activities in the area of operations. In military jargon, reconnaissance is abbreviated to recce (Note: The dictionary definition of recce at Wiktionary) (in British, Canadian, Australian English) and to recon (Note: The dictionary definition of recon at Wiktionary) (in American English), both derived from the root word reconnoitre / reconnoitering.

The types of reconnaissance include patrolling the local area of operations and long-range reconnaissance patrols, which are tasks usually realized in the United States of America by U.S. Army Rangers, cavalry scouts, and military intelligence specialists, using navy ships and submarines, reconnaissance aircraft, satellites to collect raw intelligence; and establishing observation posts. Moreover, espionage is different from reconnaissance, because spies work as civilians in enemy territory.

== Etymology ==
Reconnaissance is a mission to obtain information by visual observation or other detection methods, about the activities and resources of an enemy or potential enemy, or about the meteorologic, hydrographic, or geographic characteristics of a particular area.

— Reconnaissance (US Army FM 7-92; Chap. 4)

The word is derived from the Middle French reconoissance, meaning "recognition".

== Overview ==
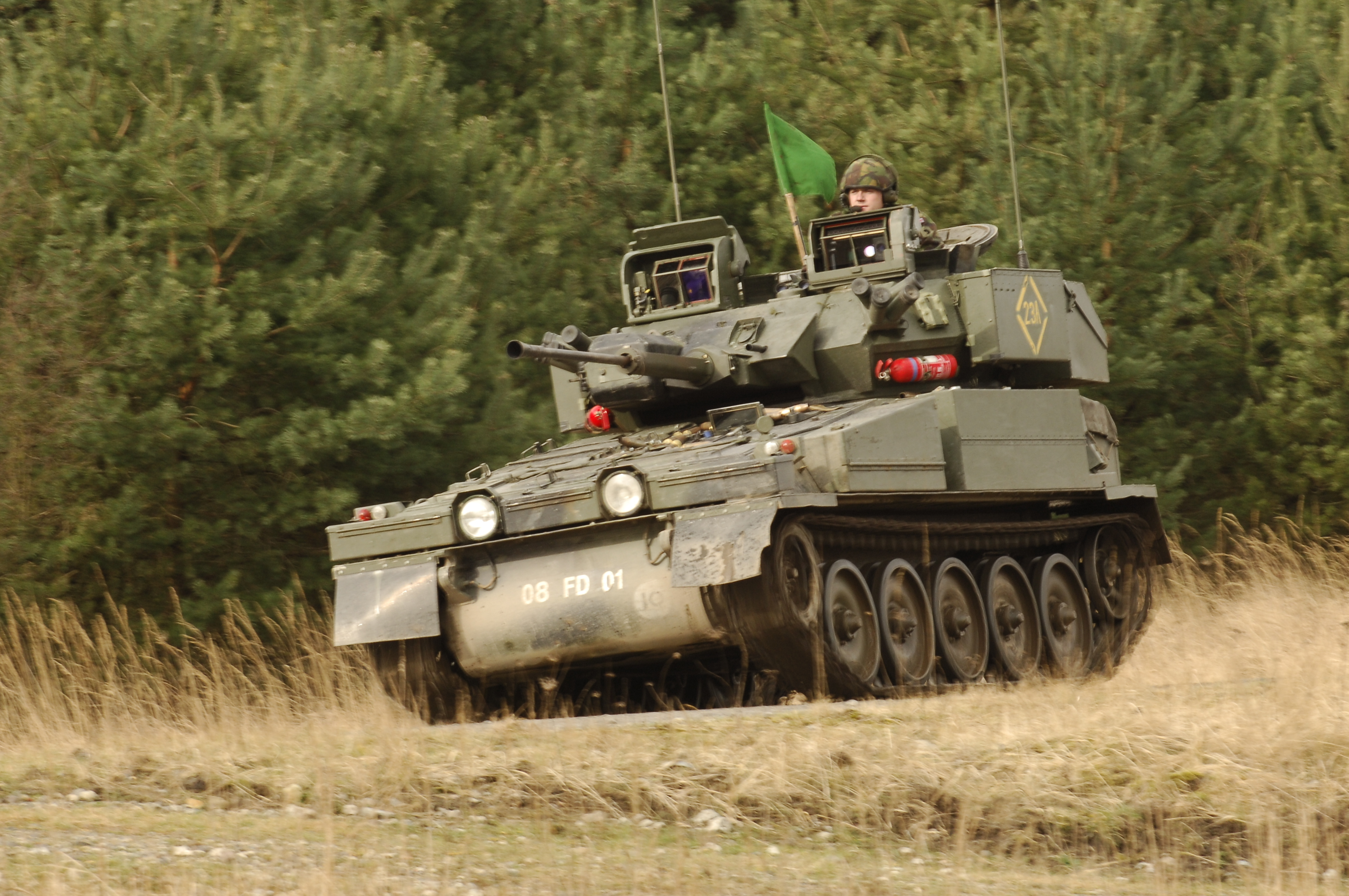
A tracked FV107 Scimitar as used by armoured reconnaissance regiments of the British Army

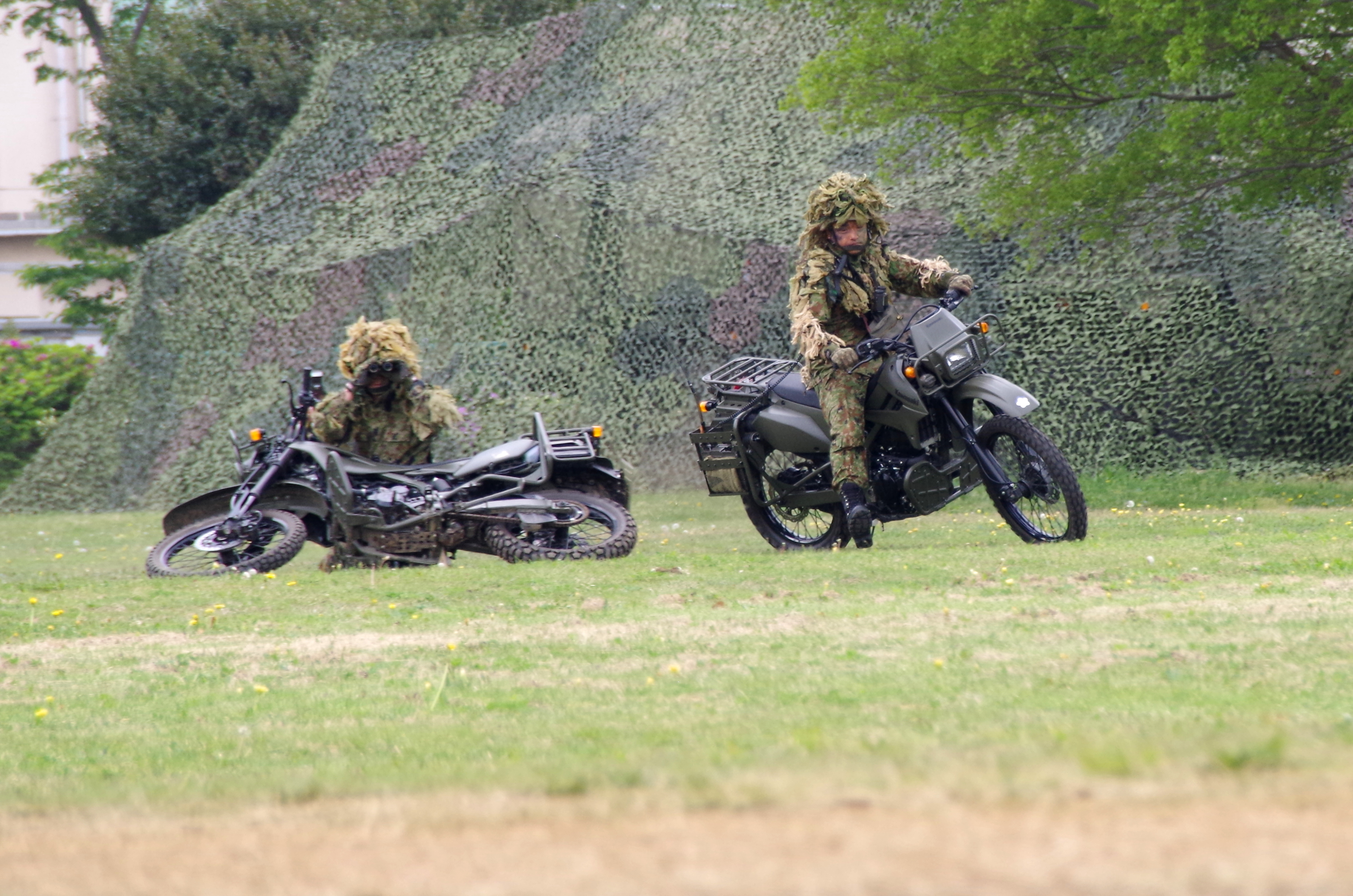
A two-man JGSDF team mans Kawasaki KLX250 dirt bikes in the reconnaissance role during a public demonstration

Reconnaissance conducted by ground forces includes special reconnaissance, armored reconnaissance, amphibious reconnaissance and civil reconnaissance.

Aerial reconnaissance is reconnaissance carried out by aircraft (of all types including balloons and uncrewed aircraft). The purpose is to survey weather conditions, map terrain, and may include military purposes such as observing tangible structures, particular areas, and movement of enemy forces.

Naval forces use aerial and satellite reconnaissance to observe enemy forces. Navies also undertake hydrographic surveys and intelligence gathering.

Reconnaissance satellites provide military commanders with photographs of enemy forces and other intelligence. Military forces also use geographical and meteorological information from Earth observation satellites.

== Discipline ==
Types of reconnaissance:

- Terrain-oriented reconnaissance is a survey of the terrain (its features, weather, and other natural observations).
- Force-oriented reconnaissance focuses on the enemy forces (number, equipment, activities, disposition etc.) and may include target acquisition.
- Civil-oriented reconnaissance focuses on the civil dimension of the battlespace (areas, structures, capabilities, organizations, people and events abbreviated ASCOPE).

The techniques and objectives are not mutually exclusive; it is up to the commander whether they are carried out separately or by the same unit.

=== Reconnaissance-in-force ===
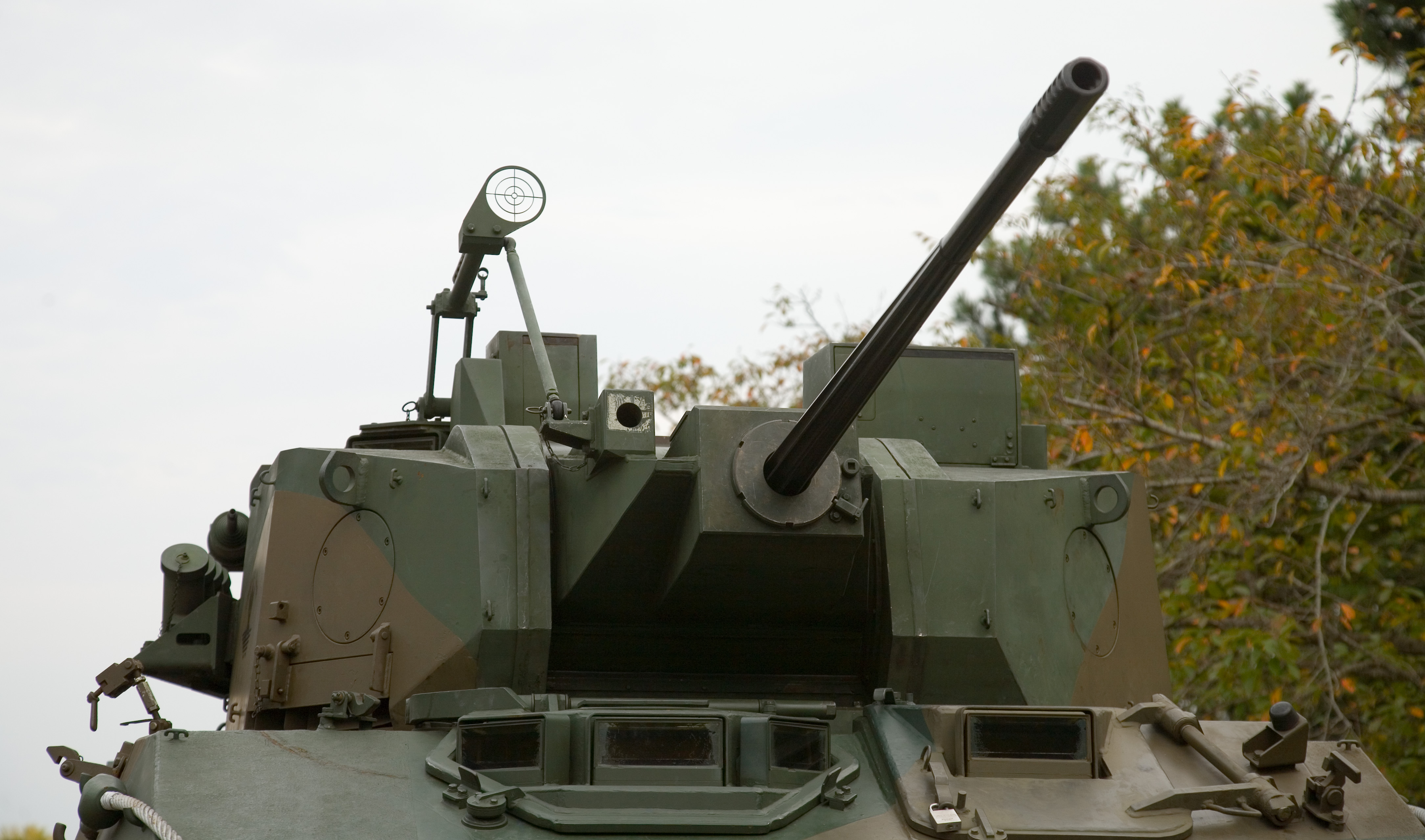
A Type 87 RCV of the JGSDF

Reconnaissance-in-force (RIF) is a type of military operation or military tactic used specifically to probe an enemy's combat ability.

While typical reconnaissance forces are small and armed only for self-defense, RIF use considerable (but not decisive) force in order to elicit a strong reaction by the enemy that more accurately reveals its own strength, deployment, preparedness, determination, and other tactical data. The RIF units can then fall back and report this data, or expand the conflict into a full engagement if enemy weaknesses are revealed.

Other methods consist of hit-and-run tactics using rapid mobility, and in some cases light-armored vehicles for added fire superiority, as the need arises.

Maintaining active RIF can be used to limit, or even deny, enemy reconnaissance.

The German Army's reconnaissance during World War II is described in the following way:

The purpose of reconnaissance and the types of units employed to obtain information are similar in the U.S. and the German Armies. German tactical principles of reconnaissance, however, diverge somewhat from those of the U.S. The Germans stress aggressiveness, attempt to obtain superiority in the area to be reconnoitered, and strive for continuous observation of the enemy. They believe in employing reconnaissance units in force as a rule. They expect and are prepared to fight to obtain the desired information. Often they assign supplementary tasks to their reconnaissance units, such as sabotage behind enemy lines, harassment, or counter-reconnaissance.

Only enough reconnaissance troops are sent on a mission to assure superiority in the area to be reconnoitered. Reserves are kept on hand to be committed when the reconnaissance must be intensified, when the original force meets strong enemy opposition, or when the direction and area to be reconnoitered are changed. The Germans encourage aggressive action against enemy security forces. When their reconnaissance units meet superior enemy forces, they fight a delaying action while other units attempt to flank the enemy.

=== Reconnaissance-by-fire ===
Reconnaissance-by-fire (or speculative fire) is the act of firing at likely enemy positions to cause the enemy force to reveal their location by moving or by returning fire.

=== Reconnaissance-pull ===
Reconnaissance-pull is a tactic that is applied at the regiment to division level and defined as locating and rapidly exploiting enemy weaknesses. It is the ability to determine enemy positions and create exploitable gaps through which friendly forces can pass while avoiding obstacles and strong points.

A textbook example of reconnaissance-pull was documented during the Tinian landings of World War II, utilized by the United States Marine Corps's Amphibious Reconnaissance Battalion, from V Amphibious Corps. Aerial photography and the confirmation by the amphibious reconnaissance platoons determined that the Japanese defenders had largely ignored the northern beaches of the island, focusing most of their defensive effort on beaches in the south-west which were more favorable for an amphibious landing. American forces quickly changed their landing location to the northern beaches and planned a small and hasty "deception" operation off the southern beach, which resulted in a complete surprise for the Japanese forces. As a result, American forces were able to fight the Japanese force on land, where they had the advantage, leading to light losses and a relatively short battle that lasted only 9 days.

== Types ==
United States Army 82nd Airborne Division Long Range Reconnaissance Detachment (LRSD), 1994

When referring to reconnaissance, a commander's full intention is to have a vivid picture of his battlespace. The commander organizes the reconnaissance platoon based on:

1. mission,
2. enemy,
3. terrain,
4. troops and support available,
5. time available, and
6. civil considerations.

This analysis determines whether the platoon uses single or multiple elements to conduct the reconnaissance, whether it pertains to area, zone, or route reconnaissance, the following techniques may be used as long as the fundamentals of reconnaissance are applied.

Scouts may also have different tasks to perform for their commanders of higher echelons, for example: the engineer reconnaissance detachments will try to identify difficult terrain in the path of their formation, and attempt to reduce the time it takes to transit the terrain using specialist engineering equipment such as a pontoon bridge for crossing water obstacles. Sanitary epidemiological reconnaissance implies collection and transfer of all data available on sanitary and epidemiological situation of the area of possible deployment and action of armed forces, the same data for the neighboring and enemy armed forces. The aim for the reconnaissance is to clear up the reasons of the specific disease origin- sources of the infection in various extreme situations, including local wars and armed conflicts, the ways of the infection transfer and all factors promoting to the infestation.

After the armed forces have become stationary during wartime and emergency of peacetime the sanitary epidemiological reconnaissance turns into sanitary and epidemiological surveillance and medical control of vital and communal activity of the armed forces.

=== Area ===
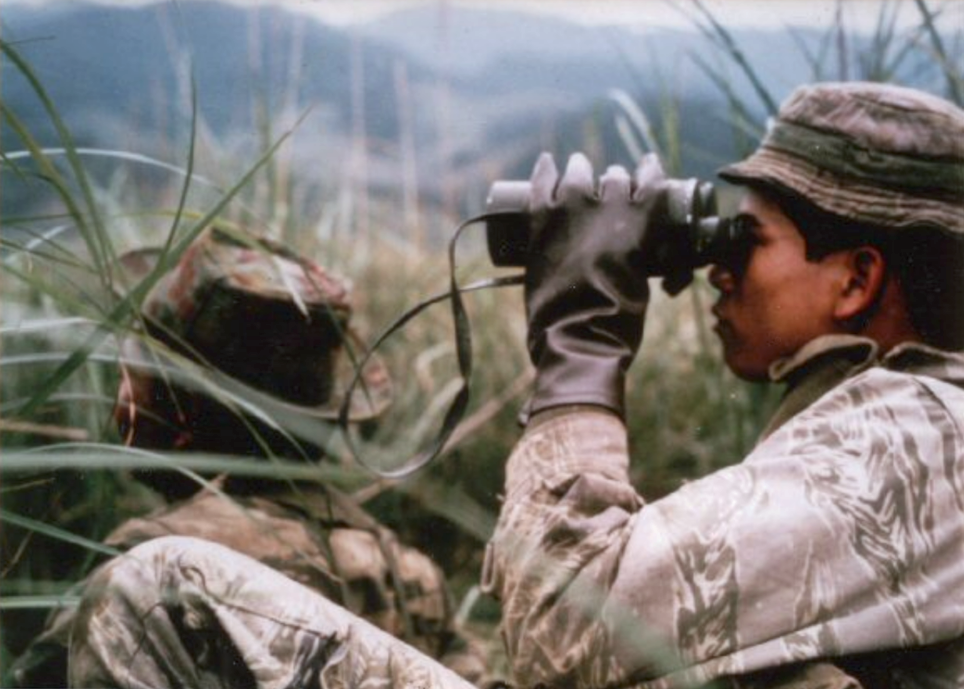
U.S. Army LRRP Montagnard scouts in Quang Tri Province, Vietnam

Area reconnaissance refers to the observation, and information obtained, about a specified location and the area around it; it may be terrain-oriented and/or force-oriented. Ideally, a reconnaissance platoon, or team, would use surveillance or vantage (static) points around the objective to observe, and the surrounding area. This methodology focuses mainly prior to moving forces into or near a specified area; the military commander may utilize his reconnaissance assets to conduct an area reconnaissance to avoid being surprised by unsuitable terrain conditions, or most importantly, unexpected enemy forces. The area could be a town, ridge-line, woods, or another feature that friendly forces intend to occupy, pass through, or avoid.

Within an area of operation (AO), area reconnaissance can focus the reconnaissance on the specific area that is critical to the commander. This technique of focusing the reconnaissance also permits the mission to be accomplished more quickly. Area reconnaissance can thus be a stand-alone mission or a task to a section or the platoon. The commander analyzes the mission to determine whether the platoon will conduct these types of reconnaissance separately or in conjunction with each other.

=== Civil ===
Civil reconnaissance is the process of gathering a broad spectrum of civil information about a specific population in support of military operations. It is related to and often performed in conjunction with infrastructure reconnaissance (assessment and survey). Normally the focus of collection in the operational area for civil reconnaissance is collecting civil information relating to the daily interaction between civilians and military forces. Civil information encompasses relational, temporal, geospatial and behavioral information captured in a socio-cultural backdrop. It is information developed from data related to civil areas, structures, capabilities, organizations, people, and events, within the civil component of the commander's operational environment that can be processed to increase situational awareness and understanding. The type of civil information that is needed in order to support military operations varies based on the environment and situation.

=== Route ===
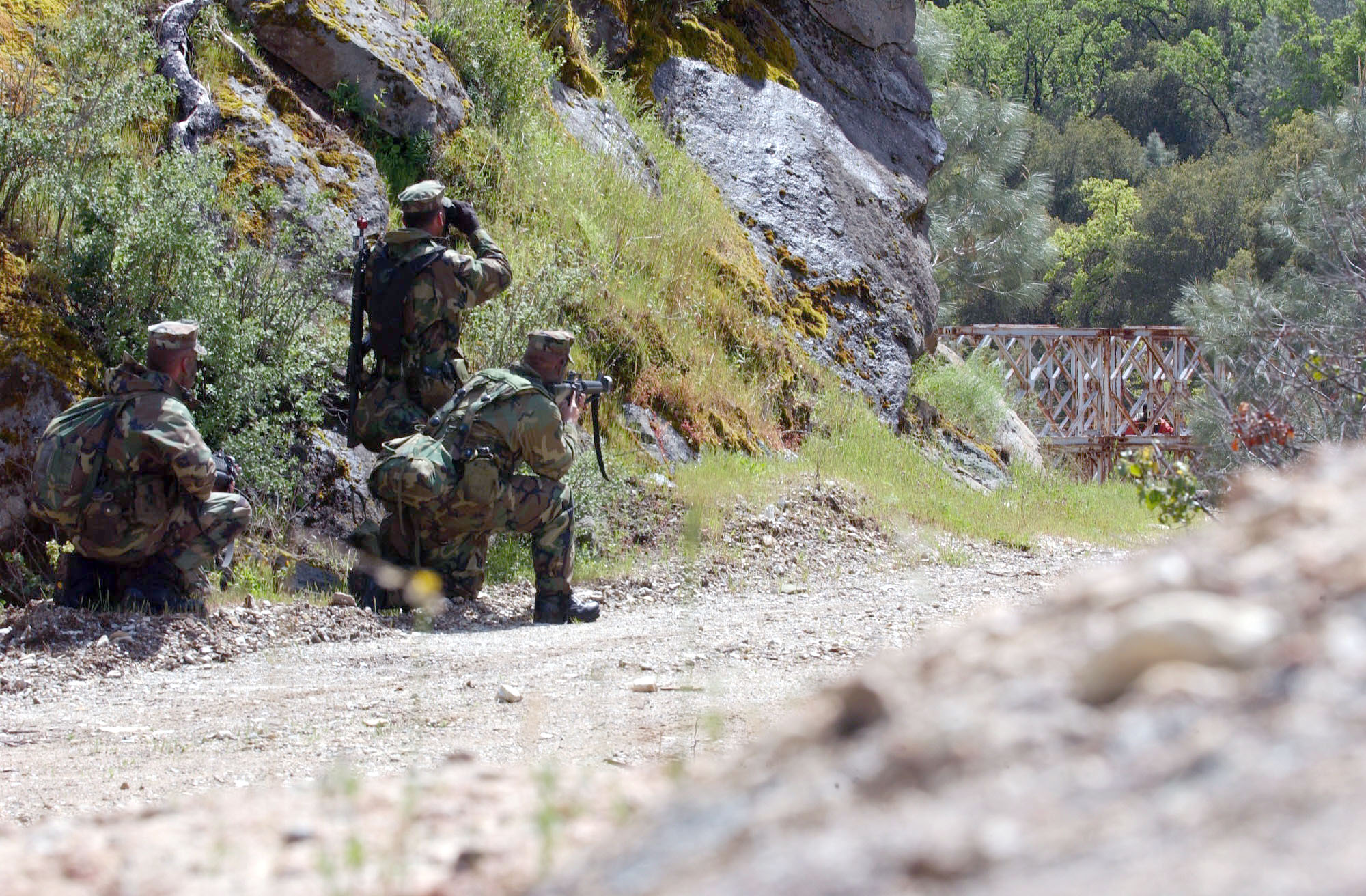
U.S. Seabee Engineer Reconnaissance Team on a mission to determine whether a bridge can be used to support troop and convoy movements.

Route reconnaissance is oriented on a given route (e.g., a road, a railway, a waterway; i.e., a narrow axis or a general direction of attack) to provide information on route conditions or activities along the route. A military commander relies on information about locations along his determined route: which of those that would provide best cover and concealment; bridge by construction type, dimensions, and classification; or for landing zones or pickup zones, if the need arises.

In many cases, the commander may act upon a force-oriented route reconnaissance by which the enemy could influence movement along that route. For the reconnaissance platoons, or squads, stealth and speed—in conjunction with detailed intelligence-reporting—are most important and crucial. The reconnaissance platoon must remain far enough ahead of the maneuver force to assist in early warning and to prevent the force from becoming surprised.

It is paramount to obtain information about the available space in which a force can maneuver without being forced to bunch up due to obstacles. Terrain-oriented route reconnaissance allows the commander to obtain information and capabilities about the adjacent terrain for maneuvering his forces, to include, any obstacles (minefields, barriers, steep ravines, marshy areas, or chemical, biological, radiological, and nuclear contamination) that may obstruct vehicle movement—on routes to, and in, his assigned area of operations. This requirement includes the size of trees and the density of forests due to their effects on vehicle movement. Route reconnaissance also allows the observation for fields of fire along the route and adjacent terrain. This information assists planners as a supplement to map information.

=== Zone ===
Zone reconnaissance focuses on obtaining detailed information before maneuvering their forces through particular, designated locations. It can be terrain-oriented, force-oriented, or both, as it acquire this information by reconnoitering within—and by maintaining surveillance over—routes, obstacles (to include nuclear-radiological, biological, and chemical contamination), and resources within an assigned location.

Also, force-oriented zone reconnaissance is assigned to gain detailed information about enemy forces within the zone, or when the enemy situation is vague by which the information concerning cross-country traffic-ability is desired. The reconnaissance provides the commander with a detailed picture of how the enemy has occupied the zone, enabling him to choose the appropriate course-of-action.

As the platoon conducts this type of zone reconnaissance, its emphasis is on determining the enemy's locations, strengths, and weaknesses. This is the most thorough and complete reconnaissance mission and therefore is time-intensive.

== Psychology ==
A tracker needs to pay close attention to both the environment and the psychology of their enemy. Knowledge of human psychology, sociology, and cultural backgrounds is necessary to know the actions of the enemy and what they will do or where they will go next. Chief of Scouts Frederick Russell Burnham commented on reconnaissance and scouts, saying:

It is imperative that a scout should know the history, tradition, religion, social customs, and superstitions of whatever country or people he is called on to work in or among. This is almost as necessary as to know the physical character of the country, its climate and products. Certain people will do certain things almost without fail. Certain other things, perfectly feasible, they will not do. There is no danger of knowing too much of the mental habits of an enemy. One should neither underestimate the enemy nor credit him with superhuman powers. Fear and courage are latent in every human being, though roused into activity by very diverse means.

== Gallery ==
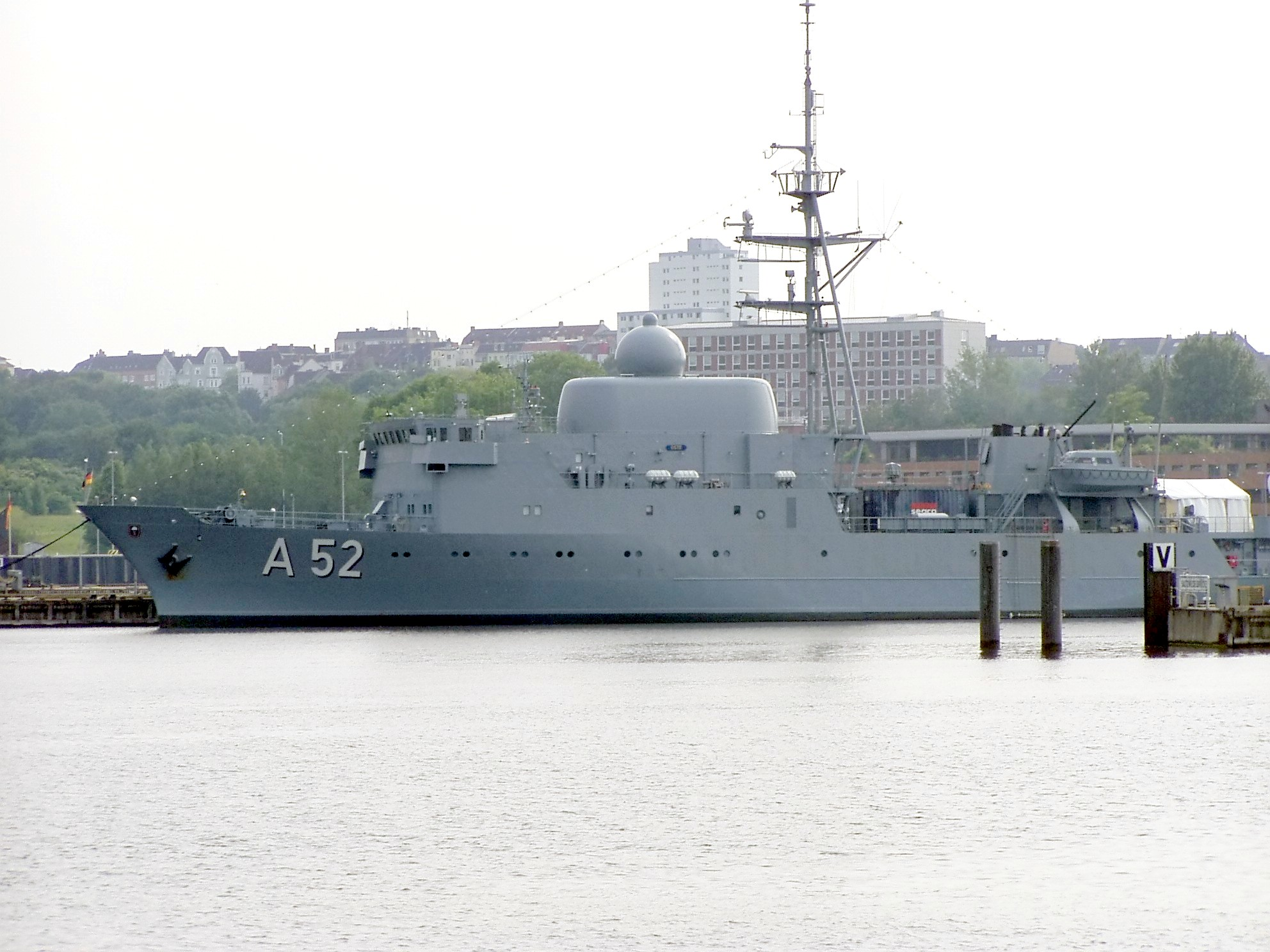
An Oste class ELINT and reconnaissance ship of the German Navy

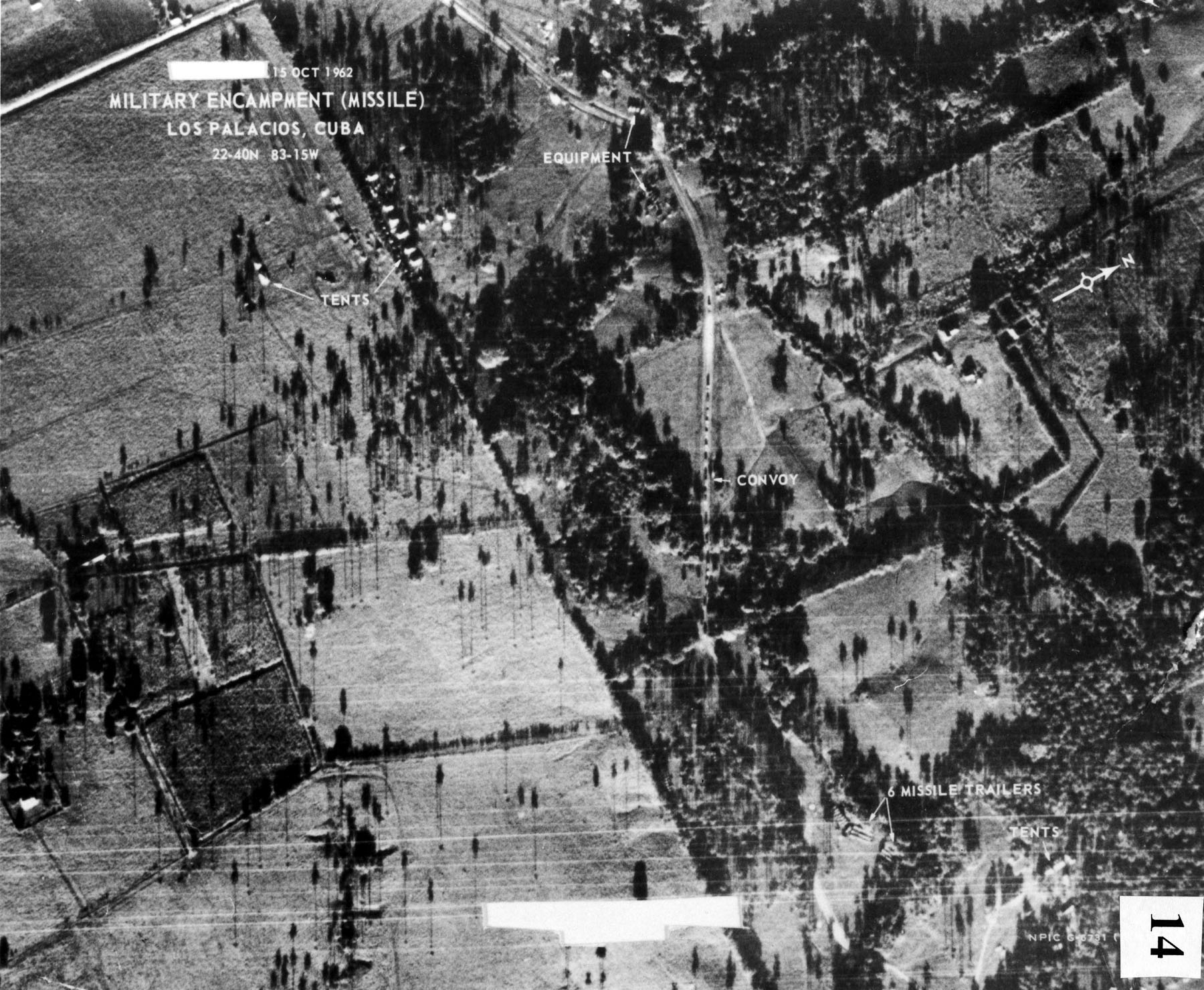
A Soviet convoy deploying intermediate-range ballistic missiles in Cuba, 1962, as first revealed by a Lockheed U-2.

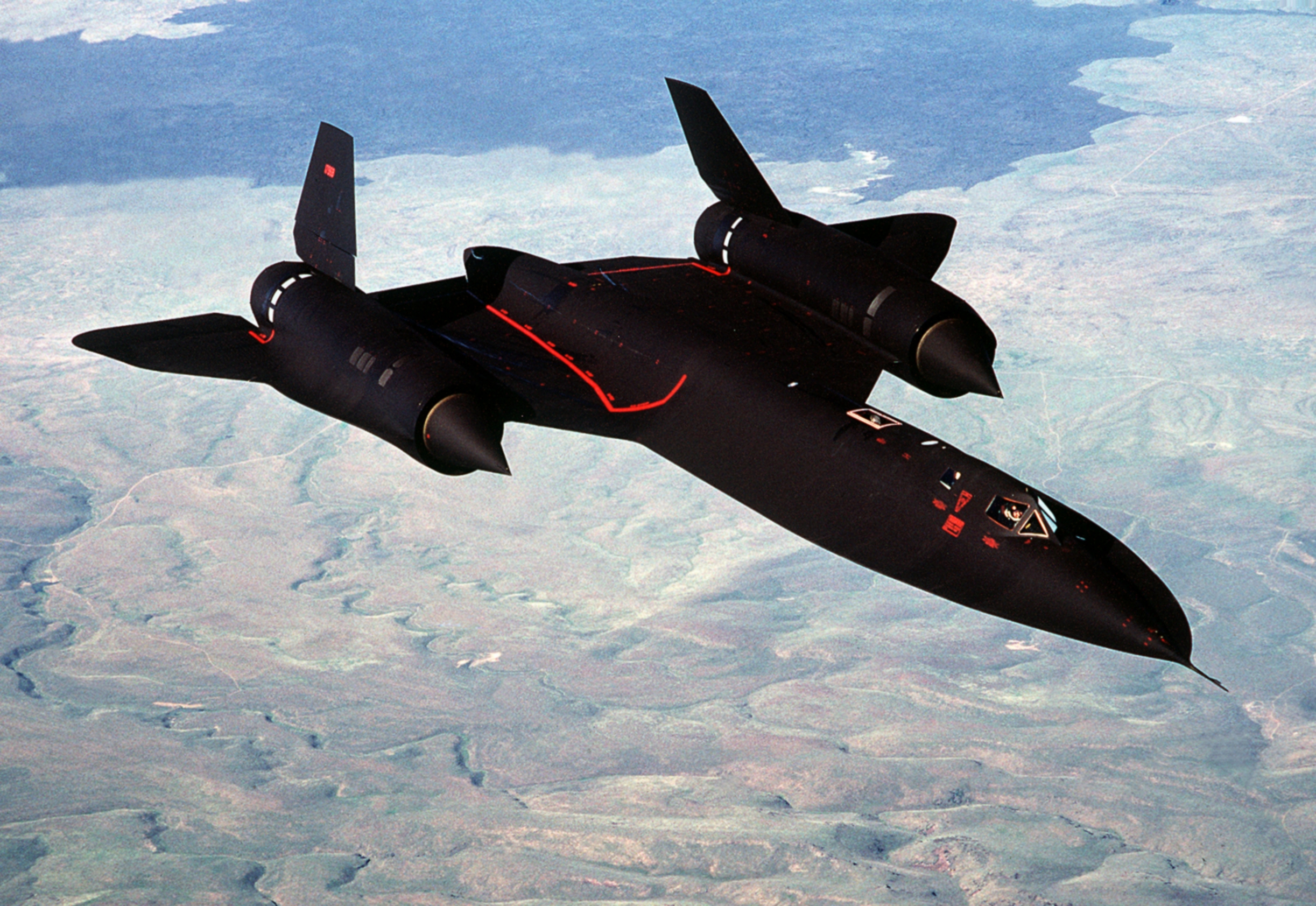
A U.S. Air Force Lockheed SR-71 Blackbird high-speed reconnaissance aircraft

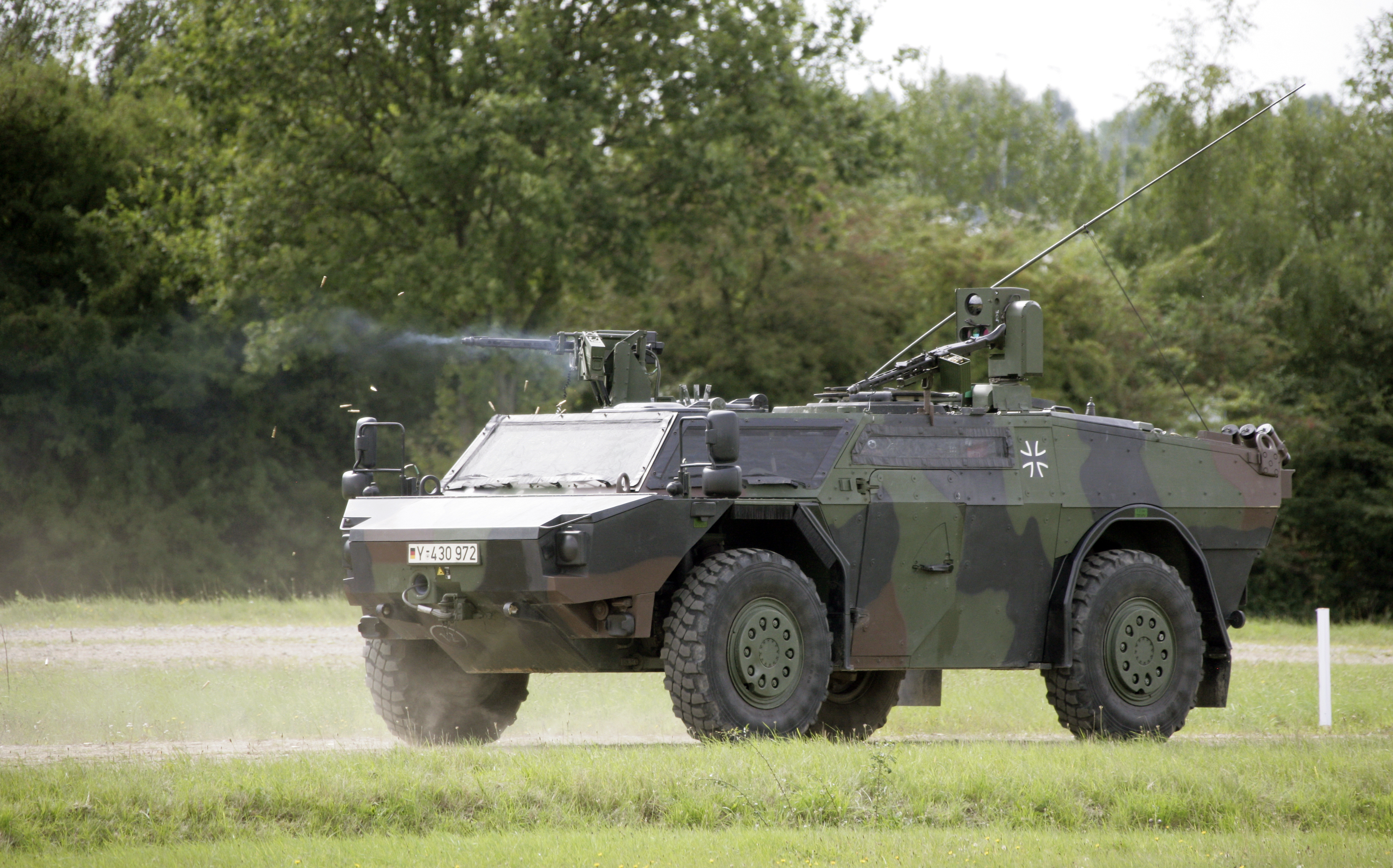
German Army Fennek reconnaissance vehicle

== See also ==
- Black reconnaissance
- Dismounted reconnaissance troop
- Exploration
- Espionage
- Intelligence, surveillance, target acquisition, and reconnaissance
- List of reconnaissance units
- Pathfinder (military) – airborne pathfinders
- Special reconnaissance (recon team)
- Surveillance
- Surveillance aircraft
- U.S. military doctrine for reconnaissance
