= Barrier (military) =

Methods for destroying opponent advantages

Barrier is a military term meaning a series of obstacles meant for constraining, impeding, or stopping the movement of troops and forces.

In NATO doctrine, barriers consist of one or more obstacles, and "may be used to create an operational effect"

== History ==
In the 1920s and 1930s an intensive development of a coherent theoretical basis for the use of barriers on the scale of battle or operation began in Soviet Union. Soviet military theorists Mikhail Vorobyov and Dmitry Karbyshev made a significant contribution to its development.

Before the World War II the construction of complex barrier systems was given great importance and as part of the construction of various defensive lines (e.g. Siegfried Line in Germany, Maginot Line in France, Mannerheim Line in Finland) combined barrier systems were prepared, in which along with minefields used metal and reinforced concrete Dragon's teeths, granite tetrahedrons, anti-tank ditches, scarps and counterscarps, etc.

== Characteristics ==
Each individual barrier on the ground is characterized by its depth, length and time of delay of the enemy in overcoming it. Mine-explosive obstacles are in addition characterized by the number of mines laid and the probability of hitting enemy manpower and equipment on them. Another important parameter is the density of roadblocks, which is determined by the degree to which the terrain is saturated with roadblocks and they cover positions, lines, directions and belts of operations of the troops. The density of barricades is defined as the ratio of the total length of barricades set up to the front width of the line, line or direction to be covered. The densities of non-explosive and explosive mine obstacles, as well as the densities of anti-tank and anti-personnel mine obstacles, are determined separately.

The combat effectiveness of an erected system of barriers is assessed by the number of defeated enemy manpower and equipment at mine-blast barriers, as well as by reducing the rate of his offensive through the use of all types of barriers in the aggregate. It is believed that the maximum efficiency is achieved by suddenness, massiveness and echelon of obstacles on the directions of enemy troops.

=== Russia ===
In the Russian system, barriers can be set up in the first and second degrees of readiness; the degree of readiness of barriers and the procedure for their transfer from one state to another is determined by the commander of the regiment or division on whose section they are set up.

- Second degree of readiness: anti-vehicle and object mines are set and camouflaged, but their fuses have not been placed in the firing position, demolition stations are fully equipped, explosive charges in the objects to be destroyed are prepared for their rapid placement in the firing position, their charges and explosive nets are set, detonators are connected to explosive nets, but not inserted in the charges, unguided mines in minefields are equipped and set, but the fields themselves are fenced and guarded, guided mines are kept in a safe condition; non-explosive barriers are prepared, but the passages and passages through them are not destroyed or mined.
- First degree – full operational readiness: in minefields, guided mines are placed in the combat position, unguided mines are finally set and equipped, warning signs and fencing from minefields are removed, demolition charges, object and anti-vehicle mines are set and camouflaged, detonators are inserted in charges, and their mechanisms are initiated; in combined barriers the set mine explosive elements are equipped and detonated, passages and passages through them are mined.

=== Finland ===
In Finland, the three stages readiness were defined in the 1980s

- III: barrier planned and prepared with materials reserved for it
- II: barrier mostly executed with passage possible at limited points
- I: barrier fully executed with no passage possible

In general, the unit responsible for the area the barrier is being built in is also responsible for planning it, with troops belonging to the engineer branch responsible for planning and executing the detailed structure of it.

Barriers are built straight readiness stage I as long as practical in term of other operations. If the barrier is left to stage II, the infantry platoon responsible for the area will complete it. Infantry platoons are also responsible for building protective minefields from anti-tank blast mines, felling trees as obstacles, and using command detonated charges.

== Gallery ==
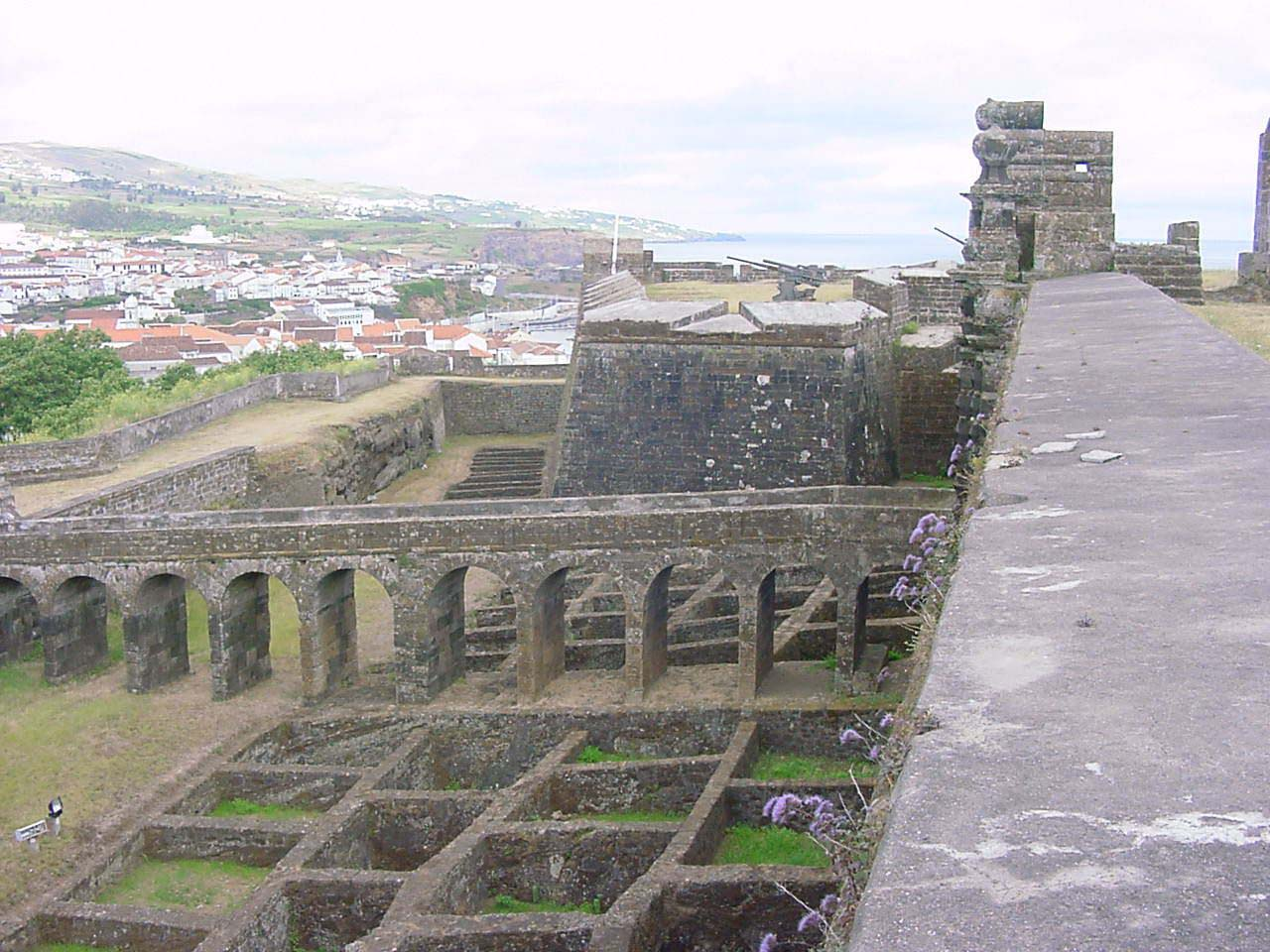
A system of wolf holes in front of the walls of a medieval castle (Portugal, May 2007)

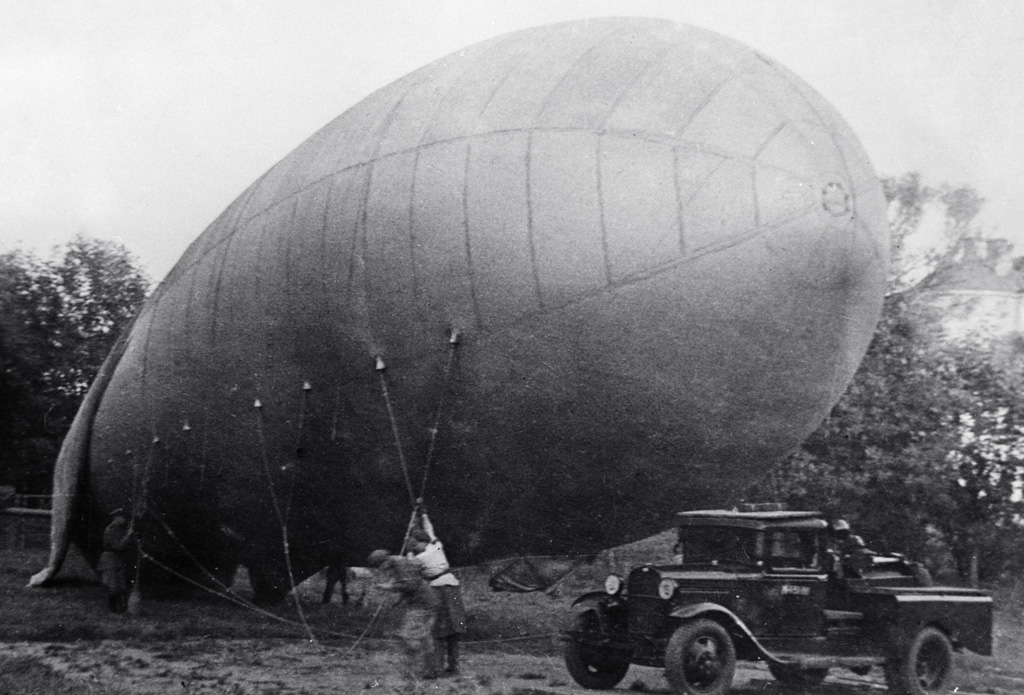
Preparation of a barrage balloon (Moscow, Soviet Union, June 1942)

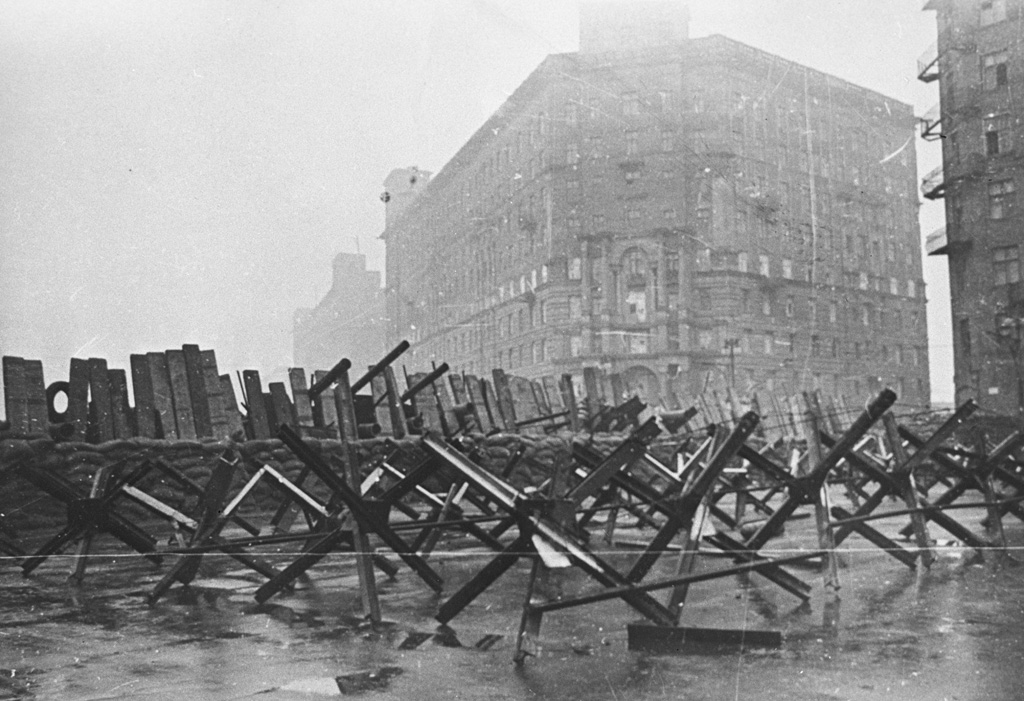
Barricades and anti-tank hedgehogs in the streets of Moscow (Battle of Moscow, October 1941)

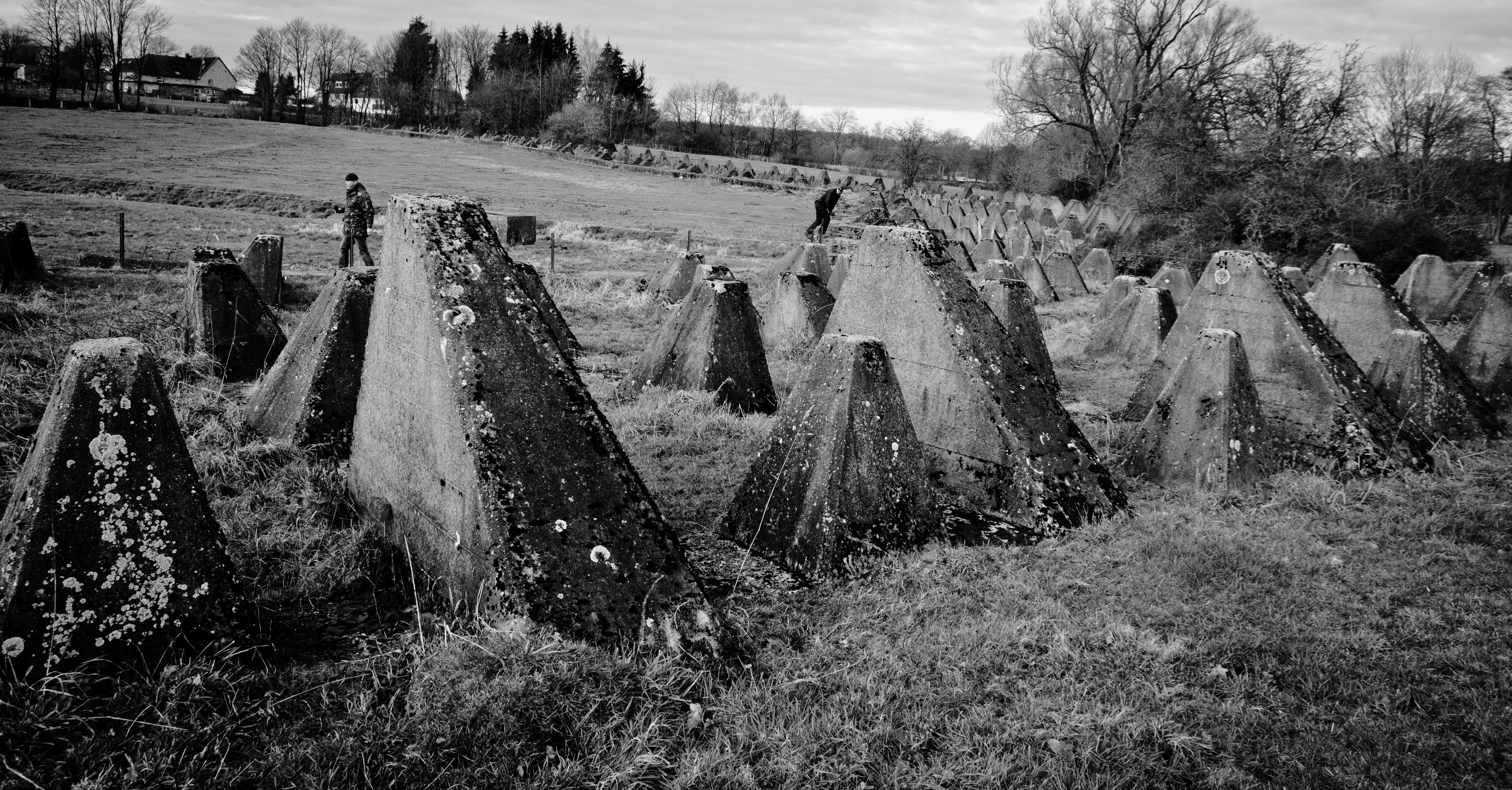
World War II-era anti-tank Dragon's teeth (Aachen, Westphalia, 2011)

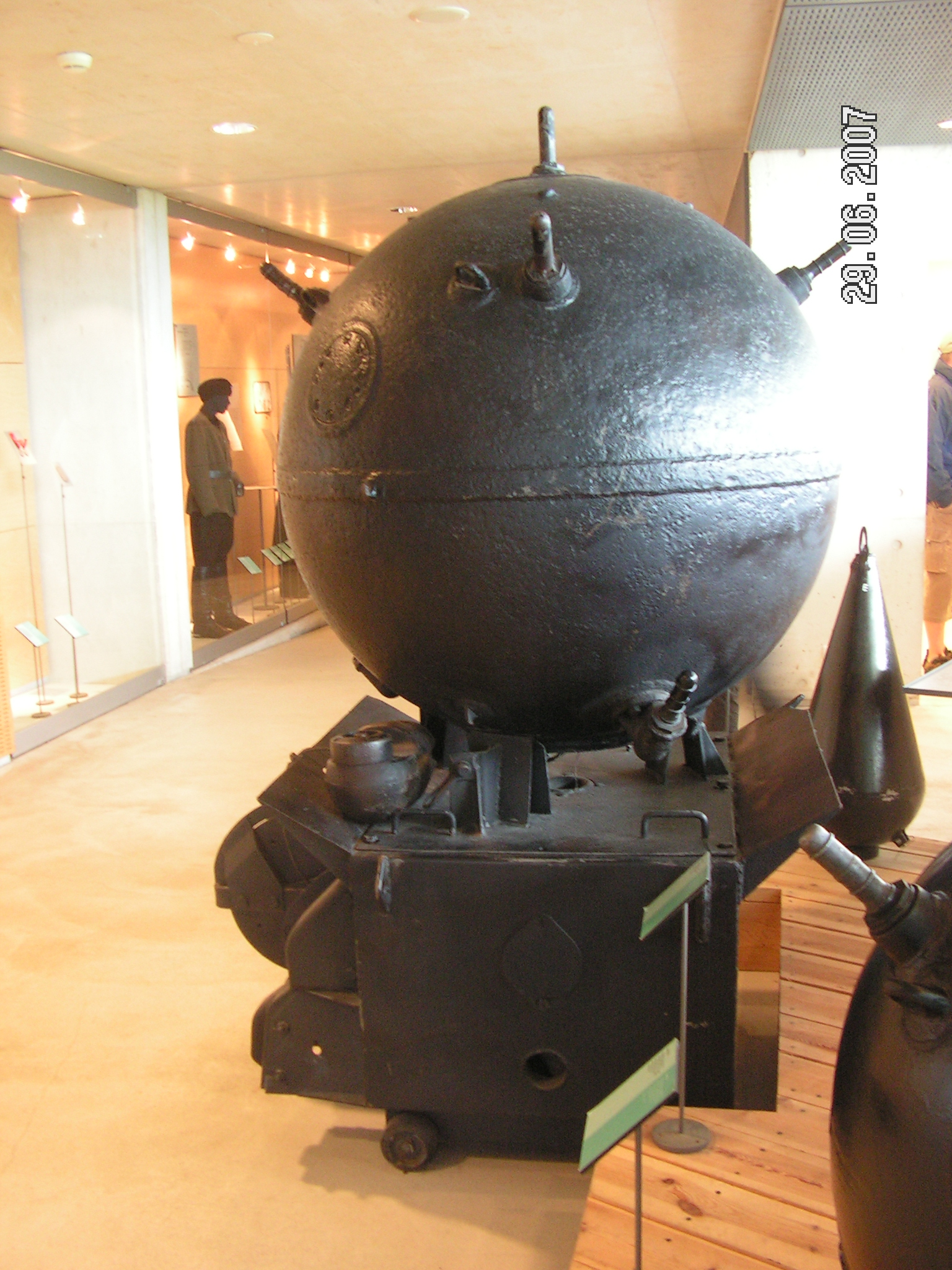
German Anchor Sea mine (Hanstholm, 2007)

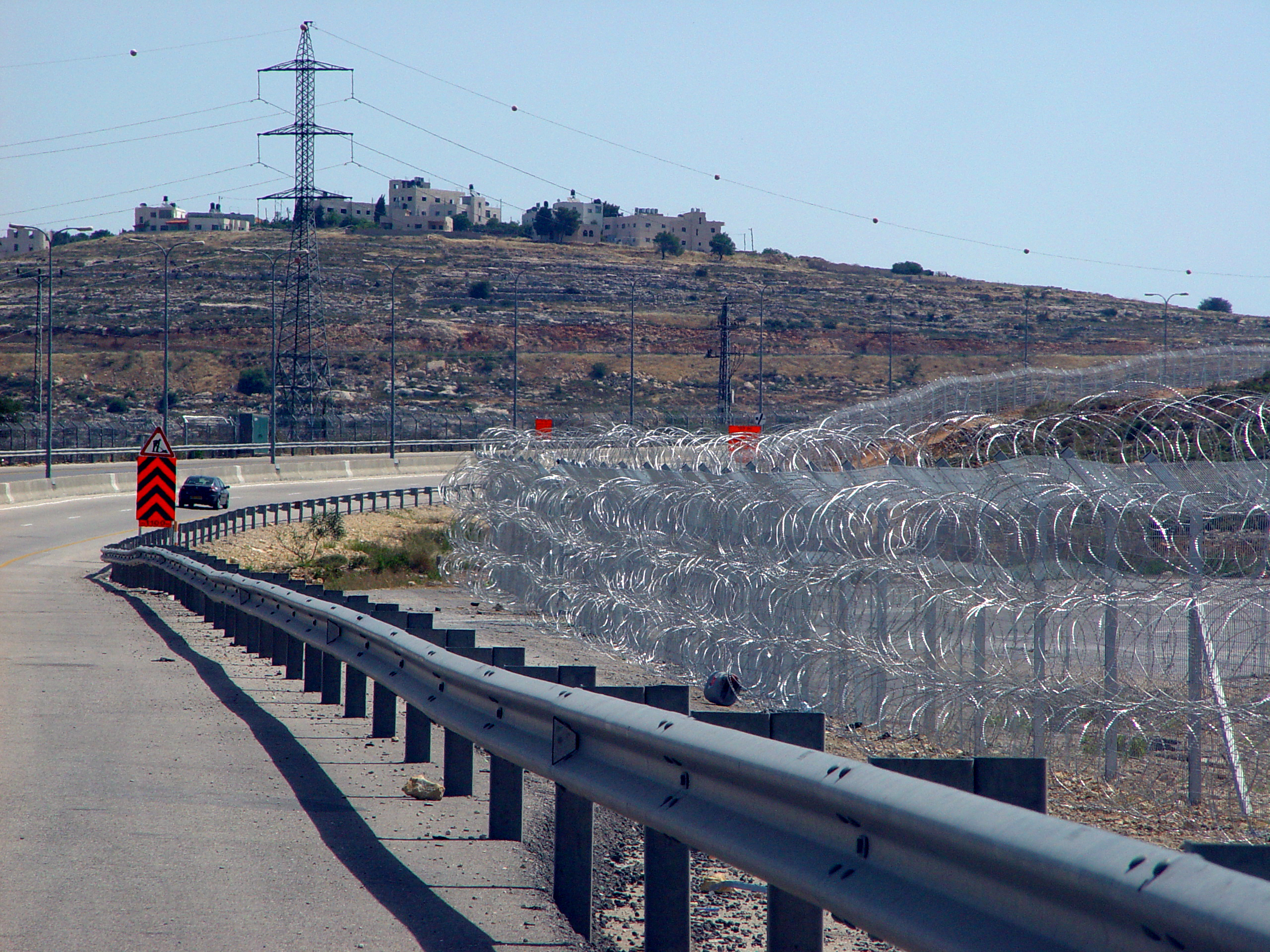
The barbed wire of the Israeli West Bank barrier (Giv'at Ze'ev, May 2010)

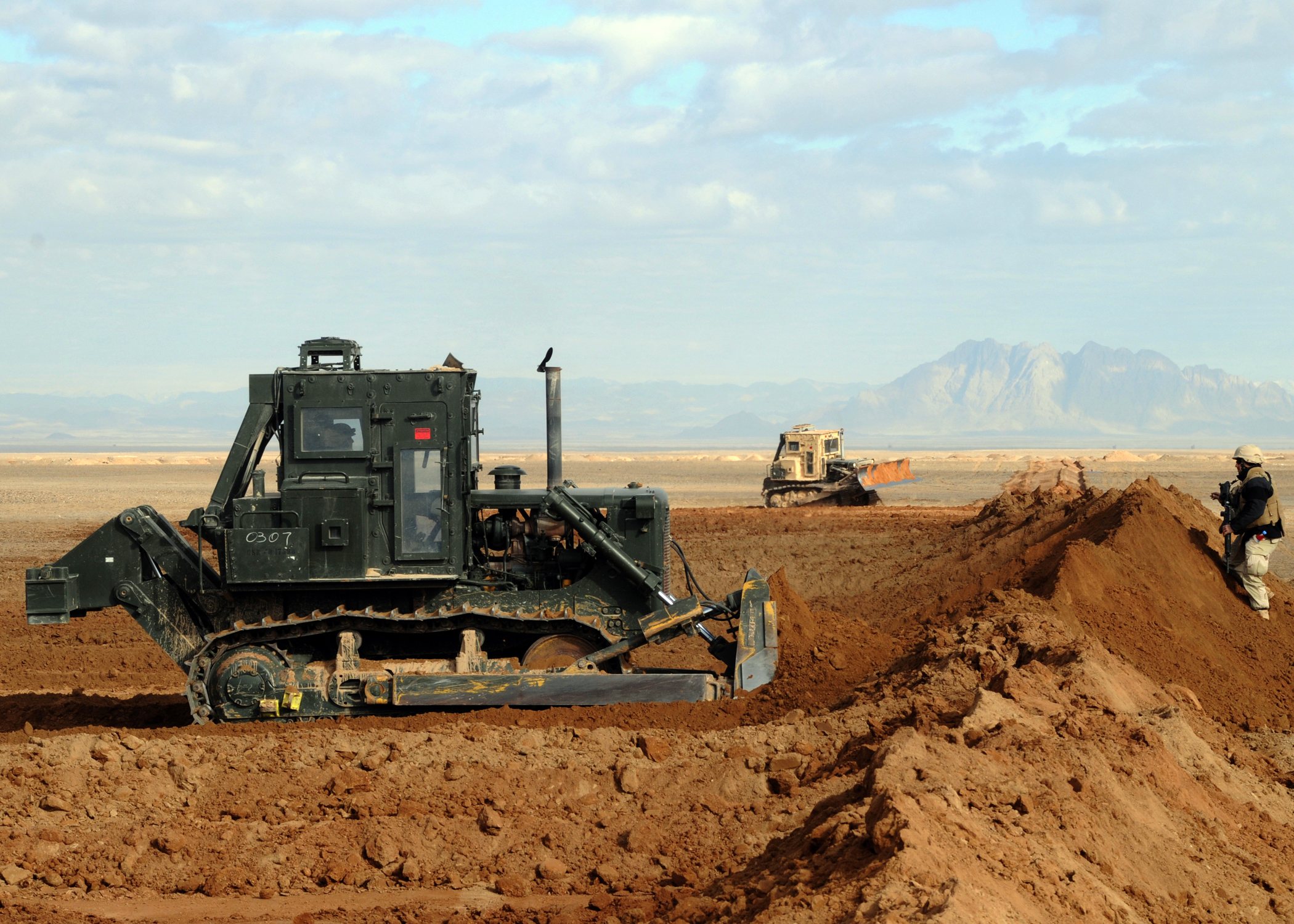
Armored bulldozers erect the protective perimeter of a forward operating base (Helmand, Afghanistan, 2009)

== Bibliography ==
- Варенышев Б. В. Преодоление инженерных заграждений и препятствий. — М., 1976. — Стб. 53.
- Варенышев Б. В. Будущему воину об инженерном деле. — М.: ДОСААФ, 1972.
- Гутенко П. Д., Матин Г. А. Минное оружие. — М., 1988. — 95 с.
- Карбышев Д. М. Раздел 3. Инженерные заграждения // Избранные научные труды. — М., 1962. — 704 с.
- Колибернов Е. С., Корнев В. И., Сосков А. А. Справочник офицера инженерных войск / Под ред. С. Х. Аганова. — М. : Воениздат, 1989. — С. 248–332. — 432 с. : ил. — ББК 68.516. — ISBN 5-203-00133-2.
- Самойлов Р., Опилат В. Заграждения на водных преградах по взглядам специалистов НАТО (рус.) // Зарубежное военное обозрение : журнал. — 1977. — No. 4. — С. 94–98. — ISSN 0134-921X.
- Сидоров В. Применение инженерных заграждений в армейских оборонительных операциях // Военно-исторический журнал : журнал. — September 1979. (т. 239, No. 09). — С. 69.
- Суша В. А. Шеховцев Н. П. Сетевой способ построения инженерных заграждений (рус.) // Армейский сборник : журнал. — May 2014. (т. 239, No. 5). — С. 19–23.
- Geneste, Marc E. Barbed Wire and Boomerangs. // Military Review. — February 1963. — Vol. 43 – No. 2.
