= Alex Bartolome =

Last inmate executed by the Philippines

- Bartolome's mugshot
- Born: 1958; Philippines
- Died: January 4, 2000 (aged 41); New Bilibid Prison, Muntinlupa, Philippines
- Spouse: Alma Gorra (sep. 1993)
- Children: 6
- Status: Executed by lethal injection
- Conviction: Aggravated rape
- Penalty: Death (January 16, 1997)

Details
- Span of crimes: November 1993 – March 1995
- Date apprehended: March 9, 1995

Alex Bartolome (1958 – January 4, 2000) was a Filipino rapist who sexually assaulted and repeatedly molested his daughter between November 1993 and March 1995.

He was the last person to be legally executed by the Philippines.

== Background and context ==
The Philippines abolished capital punishment in 1987 and reinstated it in 1993 under the presidency of Fidel Ramos. The government resumed executions six years later when convicted rapist Leo Echegaray was executed by lethal injection at the New Bilibid Prison in February 1999. Echegaray's death sparked controversy in the country, and a debate ensued over the legality and morality of the death penalty. Among the fiercest opponents to capital punishment was Jaime Sin, then Archbishop of Manila, who argued that failures in the judicial system could cause wrongful executions.

By the time of his arrest in March 1995, Bartolome was living in Cagayan de Oro and had six children. He was separated from his wife, Alma Gorra, who had left the home after the breakup. One of Bartolome's children was Elena, who was 15 years old when she moved to live with him in the Cagayan de Oro house. According to court records, Elena was pregnant when the abuse began in November 1993; the baby's father was Jockery Polo, who was Elena's boyfriend from Davao City. The family's economic situation was described as critical, and Bartolome was reported to be an unskilled worker who frequently moved between Cagayan de Oro and Davao City.

== Crimes and trial ==
According to testimony from his daughter Elena, the abuse began around November 1993, shortly after she moved back into her father's house in Cagayan de Oro. During his trial, prosecutors detailed that Bartolome would rape and molest his daughter and threaten her with death if she said anything about the abuse. The assaults prolonged overtime and for more than one and a half years, with Bartolome raping her more than 100 times. In March 1995, Elena told her aunt about the things that Bartolome did to her, prompting the woman to file a police report against him. Bartolome was charged with aggravated rape due to the relation he had with the victim.

On April 5, 1995, Bartolome pleaded not guilty, and his defence argued that despite Elena being a minor, they had maintained a sexual relationship under consent. Elena further stated that the first assault occurred on the first night after moving with her father. She said that when her grandmother suggested that she sleep with her, Bartolome protested, arguing that she could have her belly kicked. Elena testified that Bartolome groped her that night and punched her when she pushed him back and declined his advances, subsequently raping her and leaving her crying when he left the room.

On January 23, 1994, Elena gave birth to her baby. She told the court that a week later while sleeping in her grandmother's room, Bartolome raped her despite her postpartum condition. When she asked him why he did those things, Bartolome replied that he "missed (her) mother." The last occasion in which Bartolome abused his daughter was on March 9, 1995. That night, the girl's grandmother woke up when the baby began crying; under threat of death, Elena did not say anything and was raped by her father, who performed cunnilingus on her and forced her to clean her genitalia after ejaculation to prevent pregnancy.

The Cagayan de Oro regional court found Bartolome guilty of the crimes and sentenced him to death on January 16, 1997. He was additionally fined ₱50,000 as part of a restitution to his daughter.

== Execution ==
Bartolome's conviction went to automatic appeal to the Supreme Court of the Philippines, which reviewed the case in order to decide on the sentence of death. His defence again argued that the relationship between both was consensual and that Bartolome had never forced the girl to have sex with him. Bartolome also said that his actions were partially caused by his former wife engaging in a relationship with a younger man. The court rejected the arguments and upheld Bartolome's death sentence on September 29, 1998, stating that the moral ascendancy of a father aggravated his case and that violence had indeed taken place during the abuses.

After the Supreme Court's decision, Bartolome's only option relied on the executive power, specifically on President Joseph Estrada, who was then a strong supporter of the death penalty and considered it a deterrent for criminals in the country. In December 1999, after an ethics committee voted 4–1 against overturning Bartolome's death sentence, the judiciary set his execution date for January 4, 2000. After being informed of his imminent death, Bartolome appealed to President Estrada and asked for a commutation. Despite a pressure campaign from the Catholic Church in the Philippines led by Cardinal Sin, Estrada ultimately rejected clemency for Bartolome.

He was executed by lethal injection at the New Bilibid Prison on January 4, 2000. He was 41. In his last words, Bartolome told his mother and sister that he loved them, apologised to his daughter and asked President Estrada to make his case the last person to be put to death in the new millennium. President Estrada suspended the death penalty in the country in March 2000, and it was completely abolished in 2006, making Bartolome the last inmate to be executed in the Philippines.

== See also ==
- Capital punishment in the Philippines
- List of most recent executions by jurisdiction
