= Moral ascendancy =

Moral ascendancy is the influence one individual or group of individuals may hold over others through his perceived morals and character. In law and order, commanding officers require this moral force to be able to exert control over those they lead. In military situations, this moral ascendancy can extend to "I am the better army...I dominate you by my morale, training, capability". Militarily moral ascendancy then is something to be gained and retained to achieve supremacy against the enemy. According to the French army officer Ardant du Picq, "Moral force is the trump card for any military event because as events change the human elements of war remain unchanged".

The term was used by the Supreme Court of the Philippines in their September 1998 unanimous decision against prisoner Alex Bartolome's appeal to his death sentence. Bartolome had been convicted for the repeated sexual abuse of his underage daughter. The court stated that Bartolome's moral ascendancy ruled out his defence that the acts had been consensual.

== See also ==
- Moral high ground
- Moral hierarchy
- Science of morality
- Moral psychology
- List of military strategies and concepts
