= Bait and bleed =

Military strategy

Bait and bleed is a military strategy described by international relations theorist John J. Mearsheimer in his book on offensive realism, The Tragedy of Great Power Politics (2001). The aim is to induce rival states to engage in a protracted war of attrition against each other "so that they bleed each other white", while the baiter who encouraged the conflict remains on the sidelines and maintains its military strength.

Mearsheimer cites as an example Russia's efforts to provoke Austria and Prussia into war with France shortly after the French Revolution, evidenced by Catherine the Great's statement to her secretary in 1791: "I am racking my brains in order to push the courts of Vienna and Berlin into French affairs. ... There are reasons I cannot talk about; I want to get them involved in that business to have my hands free. I have much unfinished business, and it's necessary for them to be kept busy and out of my way."

== Bloodletting ==
Mearsheimer describes a similar strategy which he calls "bloodletting", which does not involve incitement or baiting by a third party. When a state's rivals have already gone to war independently, the aim is to encourage the conflict to continue as long as possible to let the rival states weaken or "bleed" each other's military strength, while the bloodletting party stays out of the fighting.

This strategy is exemplified in United States senator Harry S. Truman's statement in 1941 regarding the invasion of the Soviet Union by Nazi Germany and its allies, Italy, Hungary, Finland, and Romania: "If we see that Germany is winning, we ought to help Russia, and if Russia is winning we ought to help Germany, and that way let them kill as many as possible, although I don't want to see Hitler victorious under any circumstances."

== See also ==
- Attrition warfare
- Divide and rule
- John J. Mearsheimer
- Power politics
- Realism in international relations
- Realpolitik
- Perfidious Albion
- Stalin's speech of 19 August 1939
