= List of military strategies and concepts =

This article is a list of military strategies and concepts that are commonly recognized and referenced. Military strategies are methods of arranging and maneuvering large bodies of military forces during armed conflicts.

== Concepts ==
=== Economic concepts ===
- Salaries – Always pay your troops on time.
- Asymmetric costs – ensure the cost of enemy losses (or objectives) is at least an order of magnitude higher than the costs of attacking.
- Budget like a business – Ensure there is sufficient funds and revenue streams to finish the war.

=== Strategic concepts ===
- Center of gravity (military) – The hub of all power and movement on which everything depends, the point at which all energies should be directed
- Culminating point – The point at which a military force is no longer able to perform its operations
- Decisive point – A geographic place, specific key event, critical system, or function that allows commanders to gain a marked advantage over an enemy and greatly influence the outcome of an attack
- DIME(FIL) – The elements of national power diplomacy, information, military, and economics, often included are financial, intelligence, and law enforcement see MIDLIFE
- Expediency – War is a matter of expedients – von Moltke
- Fog, friction, chance – War is characterized by fog, friction, and chance
- Golden Bridge – To leave an opponent an opportunity to withdraw in order to not force them to act out of desperation – Sun Tzu
- Iron Calculus of War – Resistance = Means x Will – Clausewitz
- Moral ascendancy – Moral force is the trump card for any military event because as events change, the human elements of war remain unchanged – Du Piq
- OODA loop – Decision-making occurs in a recurring cycle of observe-orient-decide-act. An entity (whether an individual or an organization) that can process this cycle quickly, observing and reacting to unfolding events more rapidly than an opponent, can thereby "get inside" the opponent's decision cycle and gain the advantage – Boyd
- Paradoxical nature – The nature of strategy is a paradoxical and does not follow a linear pattern – Luttwak
- Positive ends – The possibility of taking advantage of a new security environment to create conditions for long-term peace – Wass de Czege
- Primary Trinity – (1) primordial violence, hatred, and enmity; (2) the play of chance and probability; and (3) war's element of subordination to rational policy – Clausewitz
  - Secondary Trinity – People, Army, and Government – Clausewitz
- Principles of war:
  - Objective (Direct every military operation towards a clearly defined, decisive, and attainable objective)
  - Offensive (Seize, retain, and exploit the initiative)
  - Mass (Concentrate combat power at the decisive place and time)
  - Economy of Force (Allocate minimum essential combat power to secondary efforts)
  - Maneuver (place the enemy in a disadvantageous position through the flexible application of combat power)
  - Unity of Command (For every Objective, ensure Unity of effort under one responsible commander)
  - Security (Never permit the enemy to acquire an unexpected advantage)
  - Surprise (Strike the enemy at a time, at a place, or in a manner for which he is unprepared)
  - Simplicity (Prepare clear, uncomplicated plans and clear, concise orders to ensure thorough understanding) – US Army FM 3.0
- Systems approach – Nation-states operate like biological organisms composed of discrete systems. These systems included: leadership, organic essentials, infrastructure, population, and the military – Warden
- Tipping point – The point at which "the momentum for change becomes unstoppable." – Gladwell
- Volatility, uncertainty, complexity and ambiguity – Volatility, uncertainty, complexity and ambiguity characterize the strategic environment – U.S. Army War College
- Weinberger-Powell Doctrine – A list of questions have to be answered affirmatively before military action is taken by the United States:
  - Is a vital national security interest threatened?
  - Do we have a clear attainable objective?
  - Have the risks and costs been fully and frankly analyzed?
  - Have all other non-violent policy means been fully exhausted?
  - Is there a plausible exit strategy to avoid endless entanglement?
  - Have the consequences of our action been fully considered?
  - Is the action supported by the American people?
  - Do we have genuine broad international support?

== Strategies ==
=== Defensive strategies ===
- Boxing maneuver – A strategy used to "box in" and force an attack on all sides at once
- Choke point – A use of strategic geography, usually in a narrow area, intended to concentrate the enemy into a confined area where the defender can maximize his forces
- Defence in depth – A strategy to delay rather than prevent the advance of the attackers by buying time and causing additional casualties by yielding space so that the momentum of the attack is lost and the attacking force can be attacked on its flanks
- Elastic Defense - A strategy to flexibly absorb then repel the advance of attackers through carefully planned integrated fighting positions.
- Fortification – A semi-permanent or permanent defensive structure that gives physical protection to a military unit
- Fabian strategy – Wearing down the enemy by using attrition warfare and indirection, while avoiding pitched battles or frontal assaults. Named after Quintus Fabius Maximus Verrucosus in his defence against Carthage. See Pyrrhic warfare
- Mosaic Defence – a flexible and decentralized command structure with built in redundancies to reduce the impact of regime decapitation strikes
- M.A.D (Mutually Assured Destruction) Either side, if attacked for any reason threatens to retaliate annihilating both sides to create rational deterrence
- Military district – An area controlled by a military force, for administrative purposes rather than combat. Also known as Wehrkreis in German
- Scorched earth – Destroying anything that might be of use to the enemy while retreating, or advancing
- Turtling – Continuous reinforcement of the military front until it has reached its full strength, then an attack with the now-superior force
- Withdrawal – A retreat of forces while maintaining contact with the enemy
- High ground - An area of elevated terrain which can be useful in combat. Can provide structural advantages for positions of troops and weaponry which can be thrown or fired from above.

=== Offensive strategies ===
- Air supremacy – A degree of air superiority where a side holds complete control of airpower over opposing forces. Control of the air is the aerial equivalent of Command of the sea.
- Attrition warfare – A strategy of wearing down the enemy to the point of collapse through continuous loss of personnel and material. Used to defeat enemies with low resources and high morale.
- Bait and bleed – To induce rival states to engage in a protracted war of attrition against each other "so that they bleed each other white", similar to the concept of Divide and conquer
- Battle of annihilation – The goal of destroying the enemy military in a single planned pivotal battle
- Bellum se ipsum alet – A strategy of feeding and supporting an army with the potentials of occupied territories
- Blitzkrieg – A method of warfare where an attacking force, spearheaded by a dense concentration of armoured and motorised or mechanised infantry formations with close air support, breaks through the opponent's line of defence by short, fast, powerful attacks and then dislocates the defenders, using speed and surprise to encircle them with the help of air superiority.
- Blockade / Siege / Investment – An attempt to cut off food, supplies, war material or communications from a particular area by force, usually taking place by sea
- Clear and hold – A counterinsurgency strategy in which military personnel clear an area of guerrillas or other insurgents, and then keep the area clear of insurgents while winning the support of the populace for the government and its policies.
- Coercion – Compelling the enemy to involuntarily behave in a certain way by targeting the leadership, national communications, or political-economic centers
- Command of the sea – A degree of naval superiority where a side holds complete control of naval power over opposing forces. Control of the sea is the naval equivalent of Air Supremacy
- Counter-offensive – A strategic offensive taking place after the enemy's front line troops and reserves have been exhausted, and before the enemy has had the opportunity to assume new defensive positions. Tactic is usually implemented through surging at the enemy after their attack.
- Counterforce – A strategy used in nuclear warfare of targeting military infrastructure (as opposed to civilian targets)
- Countervalue – The opposite of counterforce; targeting of enemy cities and civilian populations. Used to distract the enemy.
- Decapitation or Decapitation Tactics – Achieving strategic paralysis by targeting political leadership, command and control, strategic weapons, and critical economic nodes.
- Deception – A strategy that seeks to deceive, trick, or fool the enemy and create a false perception in a way that can be leveraged for a military advantage
- Diversion - Any kind of attack used to divert the enemies' defenses away from where you intend to launch an incursion or strike.
- Defeat in detail – Bringing a large portion of one's own force to bear on small enemy units in sequence, rather than engaging the bulk of the enemy force all at once. Similar to Divide and conquer
- Denial – A strategy that seeks to destroy the enemy's ability to wage war
- Distraction – An attack by some of the force on one or two flanks, drawing up to a strong frontal attack by the rest of the force
- Encirclement – Both a strategy and tactic designed to isolate and surround enemy forces
- Ends, Ways, Means, Risk – Strategy is much like a three legged stool of ends, ways, means balanced on a plane of varying degree of risk
- Exhaustion – A strategy that seeks to erode the will or resources of a country
- Feint – A maneuver designed to distract or mislead, done by giving the impression that a certain maneuver will take place, while in fact another, or even none, will.
- Flanking maneuver – Involves attacking the opponent from the side, or rear
- Guerrilla tactics – Involves ambushes on enemy troops. Usually used by insurgency.
- Heavy force – A counterinsurgency strategy that seeks to destroy an insurgency with overwhelming force while it is still in a manageable state
- Human wave attack – An unprotected frontal attack where the attacker tries to move as many combatants as possible into engaging close range combat with the defender
- Hybrid warfare - Employs political warfare and blends conventional warfare, irregular warfare, and cyberwarfare with other influencing methods, such as fake news, diplomacy, lawfare and foreign electoral intervention.
- Incentive – A strategy that uses incentives to gain cooperation
- Indirect approach – Dislocation is the aim of strategy. Direct attacks almost never work, one must first upset the enemy's equilibrium, fix weakness and attack strength, Eight rules of strategy: 1) adjust your ends to your means, 2) keep your object always in mind, 3) choose the line of the least expectation, 4) exploit the line of least resistance, 5) take the line of operations which offers the most alternatives, 6) ensure both plans and dispositions are flexible, 7) do not throw your weight into an opponent while he is on guard, 8) do not renew an attack along the same lines if an attack has failed
- Interior lines – Placing one's forces in between the enemy forces and attacking each in turn in order to allow one's forces to have better communications and allows one to mass all of one's forces against a part of the enemies'
- Limited war – A war in which the belligerents do not expend all of the resources at their disposal, whether human, industrial, agricultural, military, natural, technological, or otherwise in a specific conflict.
- Maneuver warfare - a military strategy which attempts to defeat the enemy by incapacitating their decision-making through shock and disruption
- Motitus - A Motitus or Motti is a double envelopment manoeuvre, using the ability of light troops to travel over rough ground to encircle and defeat enemy troops with limited mobility. By cutting the enemy columns or units into smaller groups, a mobile force can restrict the mobility of a stronger enemy and defeat it in detail. The name comes from the Finnish word for a cubic meter of firewood, and the strategy was used extensively during the Winter War.
- Penetration – A direct attack through enemy lines, then an attack on the rear once through
- Periclean strategy – The two basic principles of the "Periclean Grand Strategy" were the rejection of appeasement (in accordance with which he urged the Athenians not to revoke the Megarian Decree) and the avoidance of overextension
- Persisting strategy – A strategy that seeks to destroy the means by which the enemy sustains itself
- Pincer attack – A U-shaped attack with the sides concealed and the middle held back until the enemy advances, at which point the concealed sides ambush them
- Pincer maneuver – Allowing the enemy to attack the center, sometimes in a charge, then attacking the flanks of the charge
- Punishment – A strategy that seeks to push a society beyond its economic and physiological breaking point
- Rapid Decisive Operations – Compelling the adversary to undertake certain actions or denying the adversary the ability to coerce or attack others.
- Raiding – Attacking with the purpose of removing the enemy's supply or provisions
- Refusing the flank – Holding back one side of the battle line to keep the enemy from engaging with that flank. The refused flank is held by smallest force necessary to hold out against the enemy's attack while concentrating the main battle force against the enemies' center or other flank
- Separation of insurgents – A counterinsurgency strategy should first seek to separate the enemy from the population, then deny the enemy reentry, and finally execute long enough to deny the insurgent access
- Shape, Clear, Hold, Build – The counterinsurgency theory that states the process of winning an insurgency is shape, clear, hold, build
- Siege – Continuous attack by bombardment on a fortified position, usually by artillery, or surrounding and isolating it in at attempt to compel a surrender
- Shock and awe – A military doctrine using overwhelming power to try to achieve rapid dominance over the enemy
- Swarming – Military swarming involves the use of a decentralized force against an opponent, in a manner that emphasizes mobility, communication, unit autonomy and coordination/synchronization.
- Theater strategy – Concepts and courses of action directed toward securing the objectives of national and multinational policies and strategies through the synchronized and integrated employment of military forces and other instruments of national power
- Total war – Conflict in which belligerents engage with all available resources
- Troop surge – Deploying a large number of troops into theatre in order to overcome resistance and act as a defence
- Turning movement – An attack that penetrates the enemy's flank, then curls into its rear to cut it off from home
- Win without fighting – Sun Tzu argued that a brilliant general was one that could win without killing anybody
- Crescent Strategy - Turkish commanders used this strategy. The soldiers act like a crescent and take the enemy in the middle of the crescent and surround it.

== See also ==
- List of established military terms
- List of military tactics
- Military science
- Military strategy
- Military tactics
- Sun Tzu and The Art of War
- Tactical formation
- Thirty-Six Stratagems
