= Defense line =

Line of fortifications in warfare

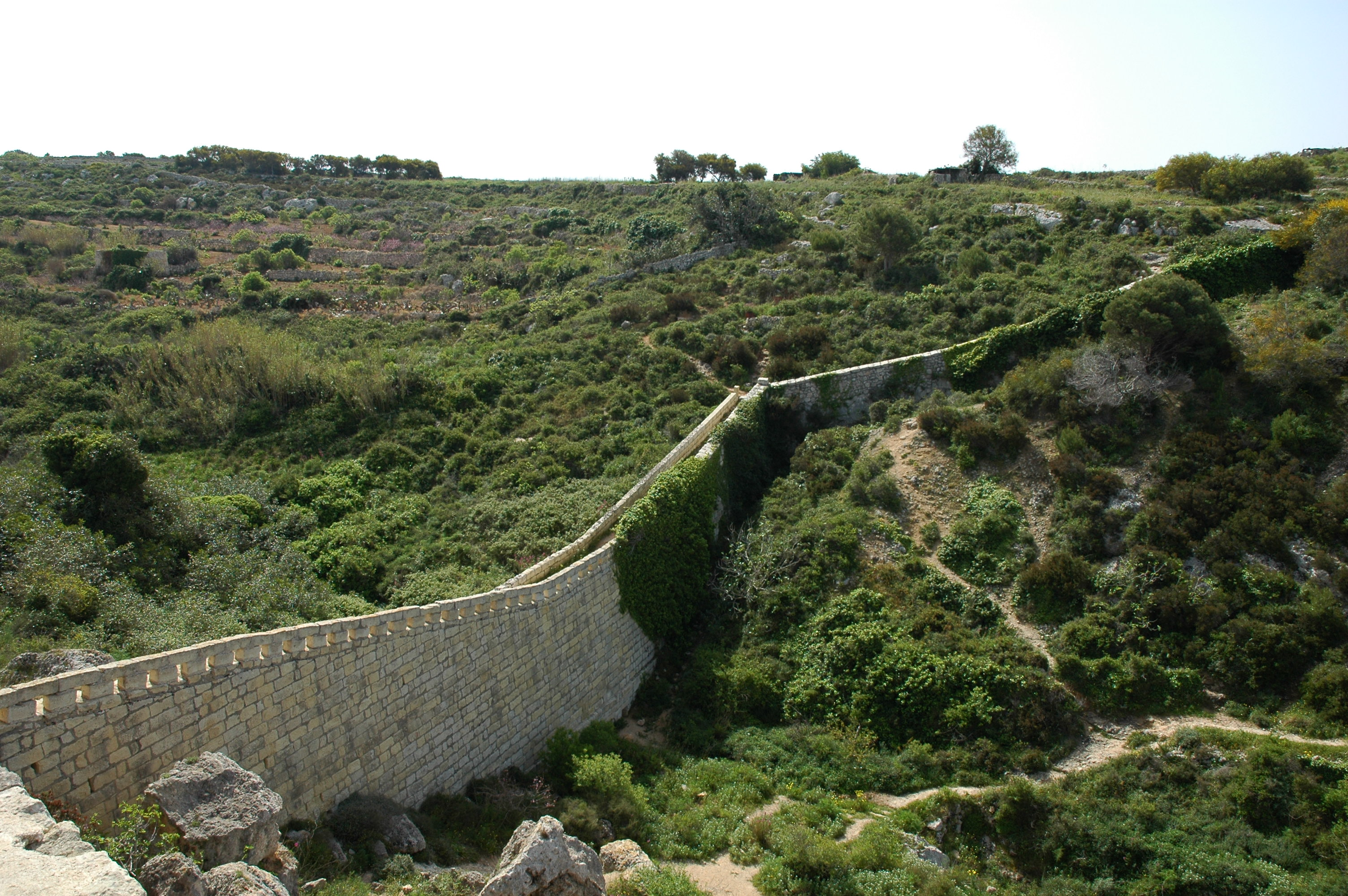
The Victoria Lines, a line of fortification in Malta built to divide the sparsely populated north of the island from the densely populated south

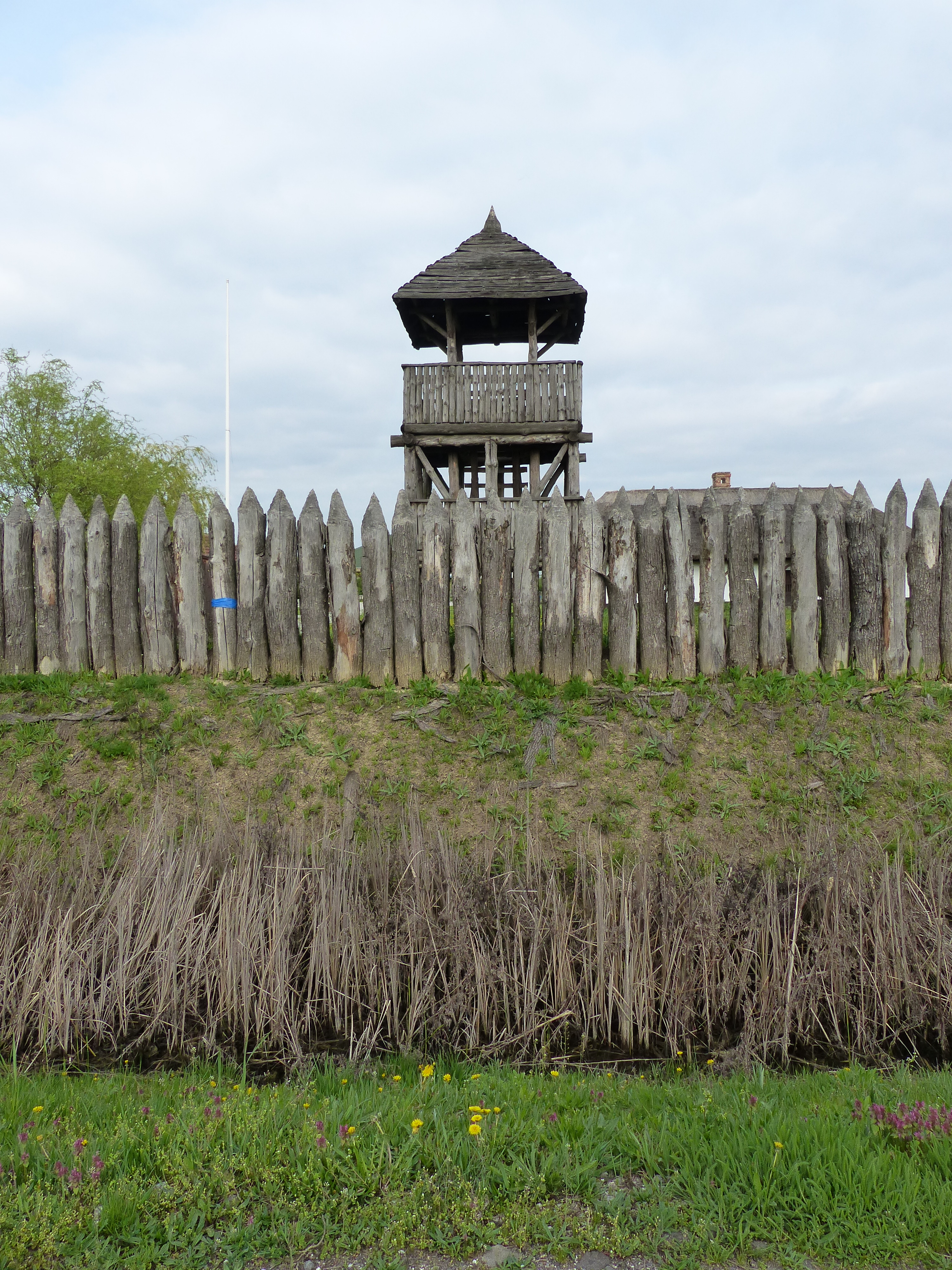
Reconstruction of a Scythian defense line built around 339 BC in modern-day Hungary

A defense line or fortification line is a geographically recognizable line of troops and armament, fortified and set up to protect a high-value location or defend territory, which is an "area of defense".

A defense line may be based on natural difficult terrain features, such as rivers or marshes, mountain ranges, or coastlines; temporary field fortification works such as trenches; and/or more permanent fortifications such as fortresses and bunkers.

For the offensive army, the goal is to attack or "breach" the weakest part, "the easiest way to split the defense line and move to the depth of defense.

== List of defense lines ==
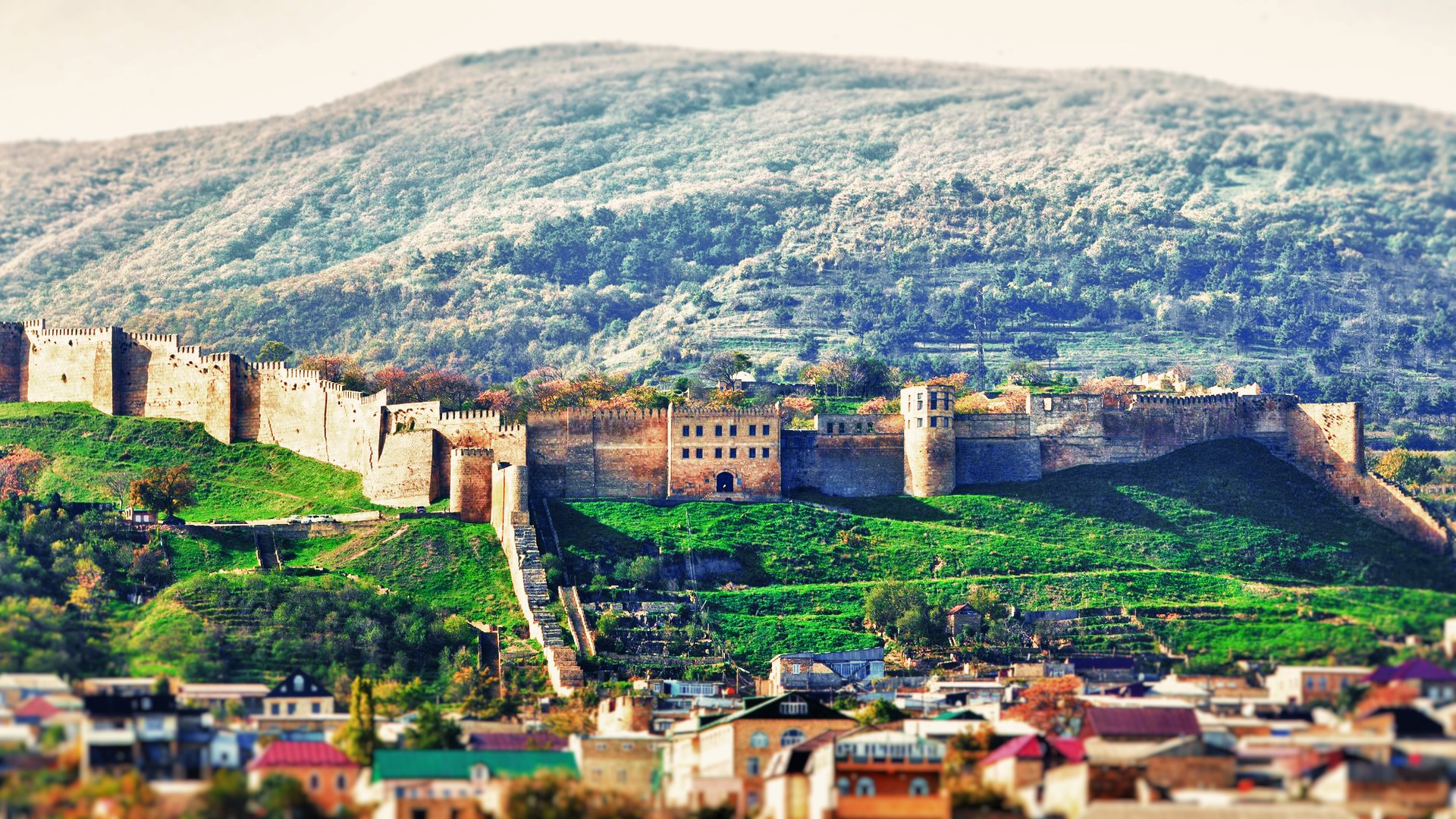
Derbent Walls

Some notable defense lines include:

=== Historical (Note: Where given, dates in parentheses indicate when construction began.) ===
- Great Wall of China, China
- Sassanian defense lines
  - Great Wall of Gorgan, Persia
  - Derbent Walls
- Defense lines of the Netherlands
- Median Wall (before 401 BC)
- Limes Germanicus, Germany
- Hadrian's Wall, United Kingdom (122)
- Antonine Wall, United Kingdom (142)
- Offa's Dyke, Wales (early 5th century)
- The Pale, Ireland (late 12th century)
- Serpent's Wall, Ukraine
- The Zasechnaya cherta (Russian: Засечная черта)) on the southern and eastern borders of the Tsardom of Russia
- Western Russian fortresses, Russia
- Civil War Defenses of Washington, United States
- Victoria Lines, Malta (1875)
- Hindenburg Line, France (1916)
- Maginot Line, France (1929)
- Schuster Line, Luxembourg
- Metaxas Line, Greece (1936–1941)
- Siegfried Line, Germany
- Mannerheim Line, Finland (1939–1940)
- K-W Line, Belgium (1939)
- Salpa Line, Finland (1940)
- Gothic Line, Italy
- Winter Line (Gustav, Bernhardt and Hitler Lines), Italy (1943–1944)
- Panther–Wotan line, Russia (1943)
- Pusan Perimeter, South Korea (1950)
- McNamara Line, South Vietnam (1966)
- Bar Lev Line, Sinai Peninsula (1973)

=== Modern ===
- Russia–Ukraine barrier, Ukraine
- Wagner Line, Ukraine
- Muhamalai FDL, Sri Lanka
- Nagarcoil FDL, Sri Lanka
- Baltic Defence Line, Baltic states
