= Fortifications of the Russian invasion of Ukraine =

Defensive lines of the war

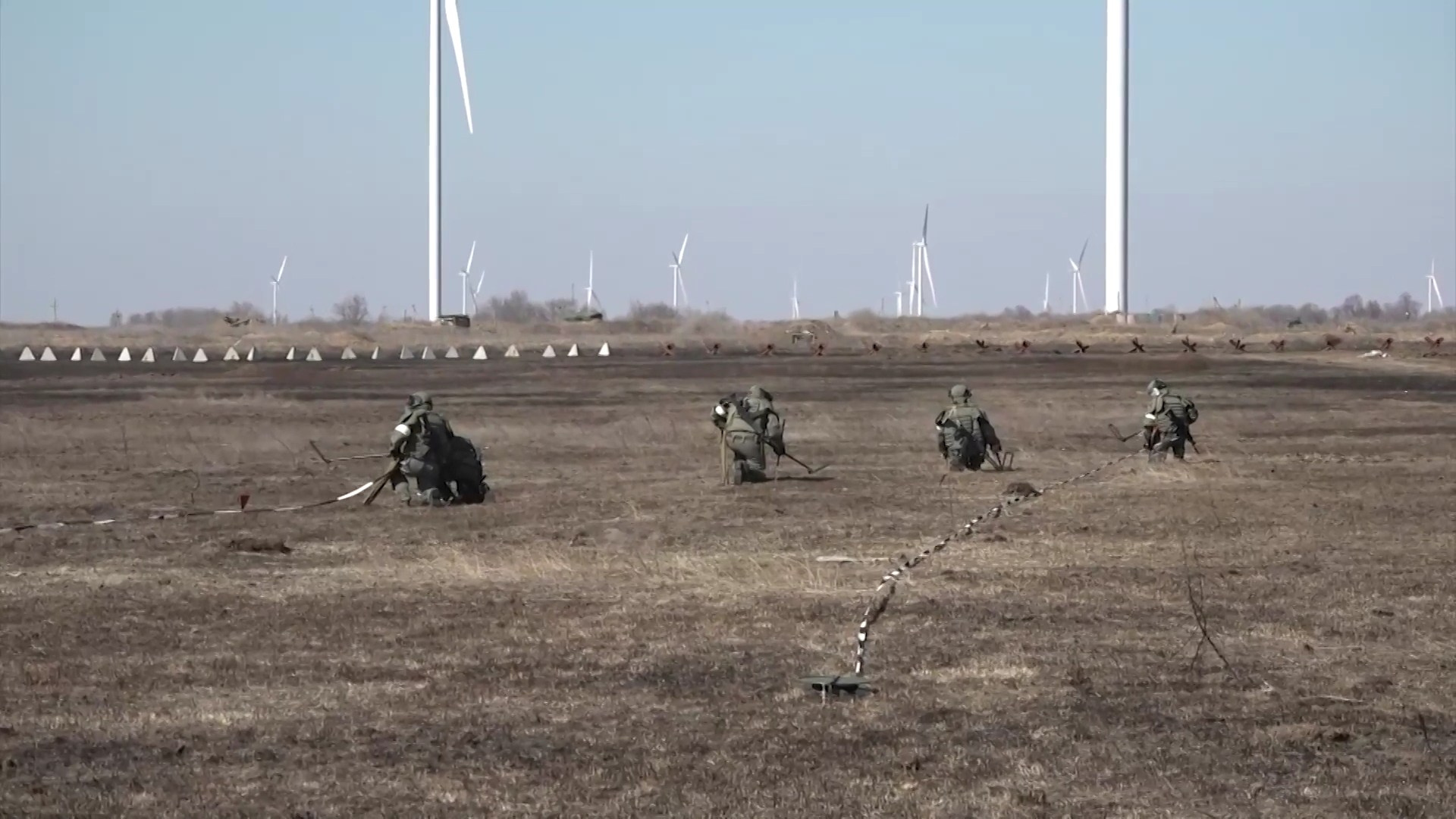
Dragon's teeth and Czech hedgehogs in Kherson Oblast, 2022

During the Russian invasion of Ukraine that started in 2022, both belligerents have built extensive fortifications in the respective theaters of war, which have proven pivotal for the war effort. Various defensive structures, such as trenches, bunkers, anti-tank barriers, and urban fortresses, were built to slow down advances and protect key areas. The defensive structures combine traditional military engineering and the innovative use of modern technology for defense-in-depth. The nature of these conditions has been likened to the trench warfare of World War I.

== History ==
With operational necessity over the course of the war, the construction of defensive lines was intensified. In the beginning of the war, large swaths of the Ukrainian defense line on the border with Russia were crossed. The front was engulfed in fast-paced maneuvering by both sides as part of the Kyiv Offensive and related efforts in the Northern Ukraine campaign, until Russian advances stalled, and both sides started to dig in mid-2022.

Major Russian efforts to protect the frontline began after the successful Ukrainian counteroffensives in Kharkiv and Kherson, in order to effectively fend off future counteroffensives, which proved to be a success with the frontline-wide 2023 Ukrainian counteroffensive. Notable examples are the Surovikin line, which covers wide areas in south and eastern Ukraine, the smaller Wagner line, but also fortifications along the Crimean shore.

After Russia seized the initiative across the frontline in late 2023 due to supply delays for Ukraine, the Ukrainian leadership ordered the construction of major defensive structures in threatened areas of the frontline in the renewed efforts to capture Donetsk Oblast. Particularly after the Russia-Ukraine barrier was swiftly crossed in the Russian 2024 Kharkiv offensive, new defenses were built to prevent overstretching of Ukrainian lines in face of Russian monumentum. The Zaluzhny line is supposed to fulfill this purpose.

To deter raids by pro-Ukrainian formations into Bryansk, Kursk and Belgorod, the Russian authorities began to construct defenses along the border to stabilize this area. In the first attack on Russian territory with Ukrainian army formations, Russian formations in Kursk's fortifications were overwhelmed, and Ukrainians swiftly advanced into adjacent territory.

== Russia ==
=== Surovikin line ===
==== Overview ====
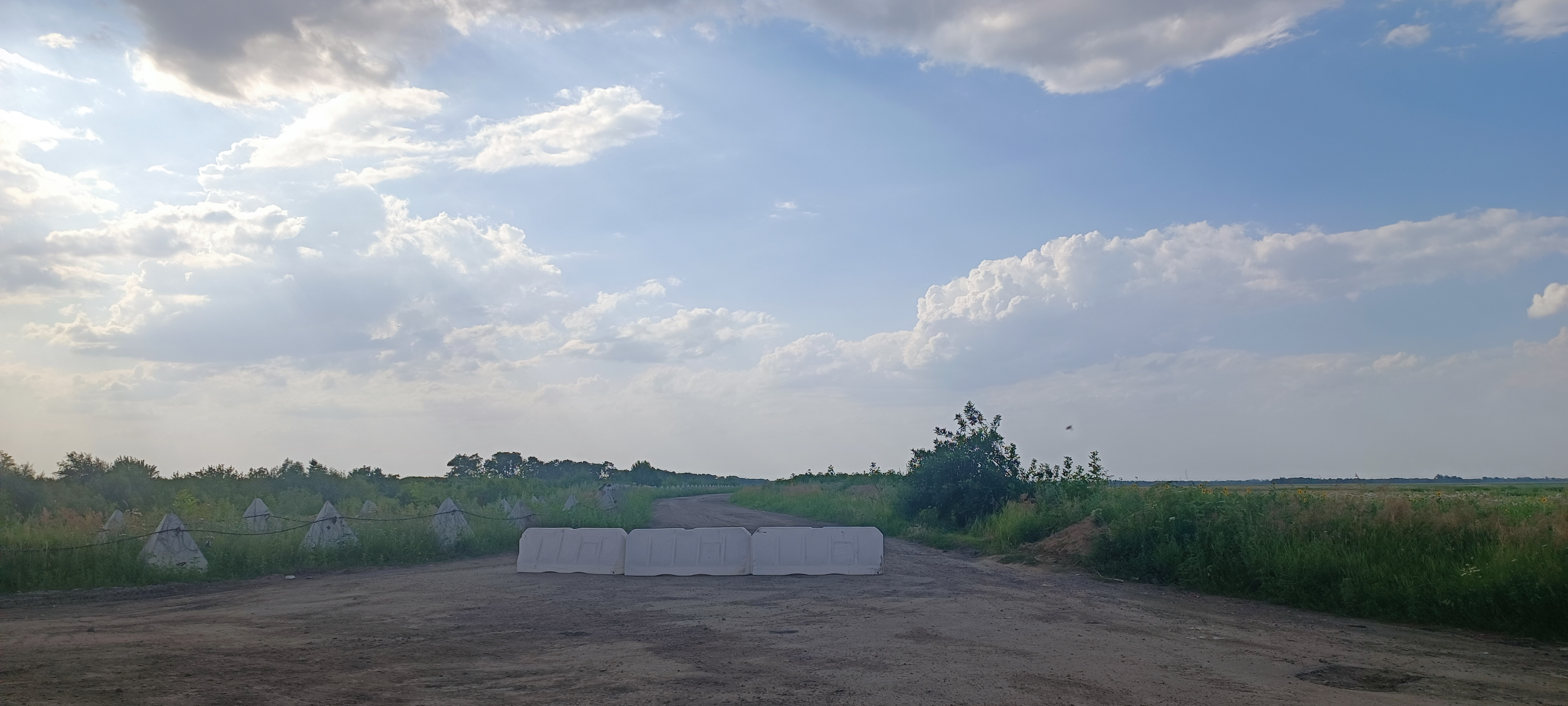
Dragon's teeth and road block in Zaporizhzhia Oblast, 2022

The Surovikin line is a complex set of fortifications in southern and eastern Ukraine, engineered by and named for Russian general Sergey Surovikin. Surovikin had the line built during his tenure as the overall theater commander immediately after Ukraine's 2022 Kharkiv counteroffensive.

According to CSIS, the Surovikin defensive works are the most extensive set of fortifications created in Europe since the end of the Second World War. A UK defense intelligence report concluded that “Russia has constructed some of the most extensive systems of military defensive works seen anywhere in the world for many decades". The complex, multi-layered system of defensive lines hinged on the village of Robotyne and was breached after months of heavy fighting by Ukrainian forces. The last line of defence centered around the city of Tokmak, which was constructed around all the city.

==== Structure ====
Russia has built a 2,000-kilometer line of fortifications from its border with Belarus to the Dnipro Delta, with 1,000 kilometers inside Ukraine. These defenses are divided into systems aligned with Ukrainian oblasts: Zaporizhzhia, Kherson, Donetsk, and Luhansk. Each area presents unique challenges to Ukrainian forces.

The defenses consist of an extensive network of trenches, artillery positions, antipersonnel and anti-vehicle mines, razor wire, earthen berms, and dragon’s teeth—to hinder the movement of main battle tanks and mechanized infantry.

The fortifications aim to slow Ukrainian advances and channel them into favorable areas for Russia. Ukraine faces tough choices: attack the heavily fortified paths to Crimea, urban areas in Donetsk, or the less strategic Luhansk. Each option involves overcoming significant defenses and potential counterattacks.

===== Zaporizhzhia =====
This area has three subsystems of defenses. The frontline extends 150 kilometers with multiple barriers, supported by artillery. The second line could become a new front after a Ukrainian offensive. A third line consists of fortifications around key towns. Russian mobile and positional defenses mean the areas between are also guarded. This setup reflects Zaporizhzhia's strategic importance. The Kyiv Independent published on 24 March 2023 an interview discussing the forcible coercion by Russia of Ukrainian civilians to build the Surovikin line in Zaporizhzhia.

===== Kherson =====
Russia relies less on layered fortifications due to favorable terrain and has defenses along the Dnipro Delta and River, which require complex amphibious assaults to cross. River crossings wouldn't allow deep penetration due to logistical challenges. The destruction of a dam in June 2023 further complicated the area with flooding.

===== Donetsk =====
The front here combines old and new fortifications with complex urban terrain. Pre-2022 positions remain but may be less effective due to disuse. Urban combat is challenging due to large city sizes. Fortifications prevent bypassing cities, with Russian reserves quickly deployable due to proximity to Russia.

===== Luhansk =====
The defensive system is divided into southern and northern parts. The southern area centers around Severodonetsk, similar to Donetsk's defenses, with positions in the Kreminna forests. The northern system extends to Russia’s border, with a possible secondary line behind towns on the Krasna River. Russia uses towns for first-line defense, with fieldworks to contain breakthroughs. Northern gaps may be targeted but involve risks due to proximity to the Russian border.

==== Efficiency ====
===== 2023 Ukrainian counteroffensive =====
The 2023 Ukrainian counteroffensive was greatly hindered by Russian defenses, comprising extensive fortifications and strategic use of terrain. The Russian use of large minefields made Ukraine the most heavily mined country in the world, concentrated in South and East Ukraine. The initial mechanized assaults may have faltered due to the following factors or a combination of them.

Former Commander-in-Chief Valery Zaluzhny, responsible for the counteroffensive, highlighted the problem of minefields with high density, which slowed the advance and enabled the enemy to concentrate fire on armored vehicles. Critics argue that Ukraine's strategy of dividing forces across multiple fronts diluted its impact. The flat, open landscapes of the southern front left Ukrainian forces exposed to artillery and air attacks, while urban areas were fortified to channel and disrupt Ukrainian movements. Additionally, Ukraine's military lacked certain capabilities like a contingent of modern fighter aircraft, which made breakthroughs more difficult. Changes in Ukrainian tactics, focusing on artillery attrition rather than rapid advances, reduced equipment losses but slowed progress. This shift resulted in more effective coordination between combat branches, but without air superiority, it remained challenging to achieve breakthroughs.

At the end of August 2023, after long and bitter fighting, the Ukrainian Armed Forces captured the village of Robotyne, which lies on the outer contour of the “Surovikin Line”. On 21 September 2023, Ukrainian armored vehicles, Stryker, Marder IFV and MaxxPro APC, crossed the Surovikin Line for the first time.

=== Wagner line ===
==== Overview ====
The Wagner line (Russian: линия Вагнера, romanized: liniya Vagnera, Ukrainian: лінія Вагнера, romanized: liniya Vahnera) is a defense line built in eastern Ukraine by the Wagner paramilitary group during the Russo-Ukrainian War.

On 19 October 2022, Yevgeny Prigozhin, the leader of the paramilitary group Wagner, announced that he had begun the construction of the defense line. The aim is to prevent Ukrainian troops from advancing towards the Luhansk region in eastern Ukraine, which was annexed by Russia in September. According to the Russian media, it is a second line of defence in case the Ukrainian armed forces try to penetrate the area.

In a report dated 21 November 2022, the British Ministry of Defence considered that Moscow prioritized the construction of defensive positions on the Svatove–Kreminna line.

==== Structure ====
The line consists of two double rows of pyramidal concrete blocks called "dragon's teeth" to block tanks from advancing. Between these two defensive curtains, a deep trench and firing stations complete the device. It is not known whether the line has mines.

The project foresees about 200 km (120 mi) of fortifications in eastern Ukraine, up to the Russian border. The line shall extend on a south-north axis starting from the city of Svitlodarsk, along the front line to the Donets River, and then form an acute angle again eastwards, following the course of the river to the border.

Andrey Bogatov, another leader of the Wagner Group, said that construction of the line had also begun in Belgorod Oblast, Russia.

==== Efficiency ====
Several experts questioned the efficiency of the line. For Xavier Tytelman, a conflict observer and defence consultant, "The dragon's teeth should be partially buried so that only the tip can pass through. A simple armoured bulldozer is enough to turn them over". According to the Ukrainian Governor of Luhansk Region, Serhiy Haidai, only 2km had been built as of October 2022. The ABC News considers - through the study of satellite photos - that 12km had been built as of February 2023. According to a bulletin issued in February 2023 by the ISW, Prigozhin's proposed extension of the Wagner line is intended to defend the border between Belgorod Oblast and the Ukrainian oblasts of Sumy, Kharkiv and Luhansk, but "would not cover the northern part of Luhansk Oblast up to the line of contact with the occupied territories, thus contradicting the Kremlin's promises to defend the entire Luhansk region". Dragon's teeth were not buried or camouflaged in the Wagner line before February 2023, which, according to a BBC article, severely limits their effectiveness. It may also be noted that the line did not protect the city of Sievierodonetsk as of November 2022. The local authorities in Belgorod have already asked the Wagner Group to stop the construction of the trenches.

=== Crimean defense line ===
Dozens of kilometres of trenches were dug on the beaches of annexed Crimea by April 2023 to protect them from landing paratroopers. Fortifications were built in the areas of Medvedevka, Vitino and in other parts of the peninsula. In addition to trenches, anti-tank bunds, ditches and artillery pieces were installed along the Black Sea coast — positions at Perekop Isthmus. As of early November 2022, fortifications were also being built on the border with Kherson Oblast.

== Ukraine ==
=== Russia–Ukraine border defense line ===
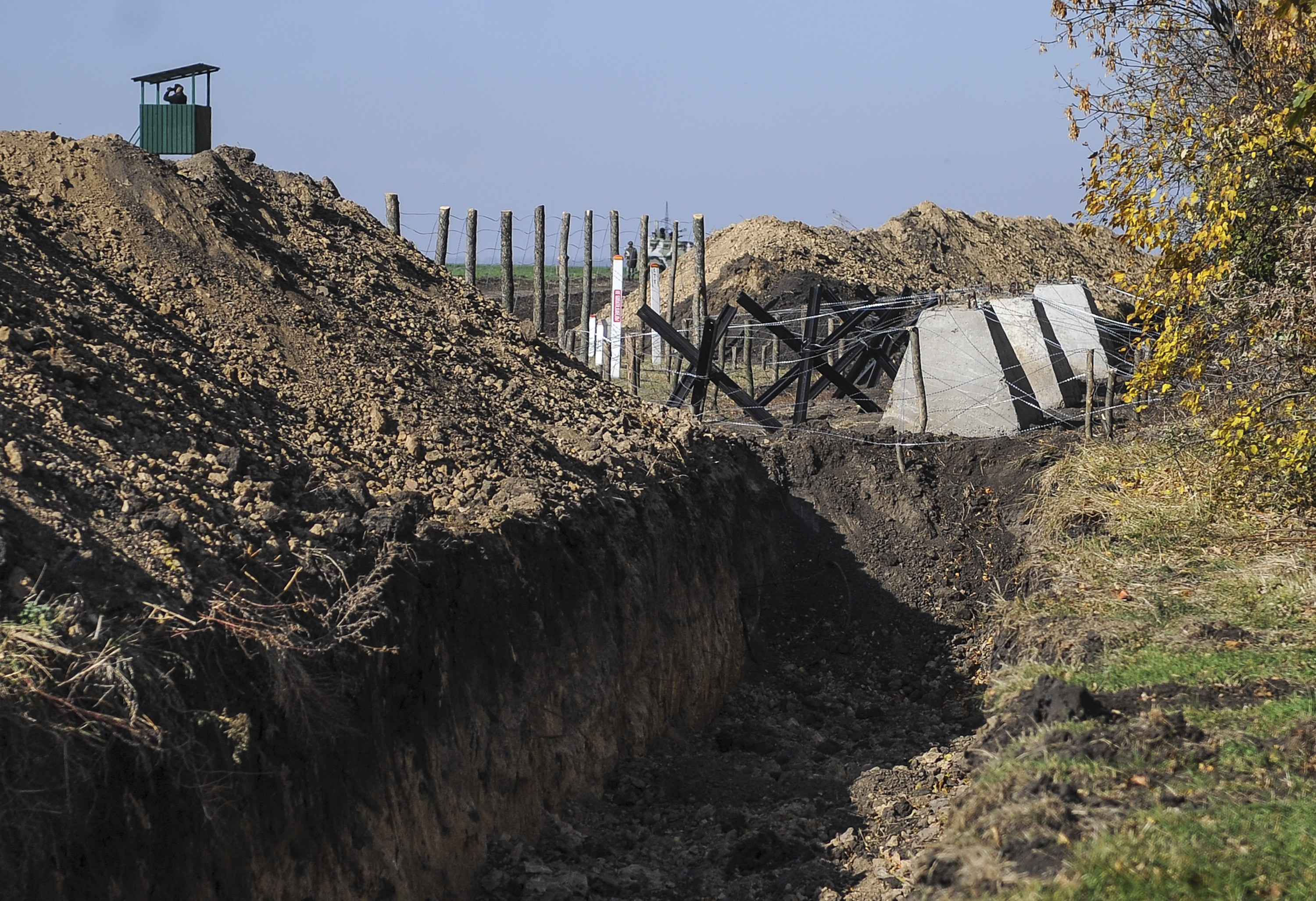
Dragon's teeth in 2014, near Hoptivka on the Ukrainian side of the border with Russia

==== Overview ====
The Russia–Ukraine barrier, or "Wall", is a fortified border barrier constructed by Ukraine along its border with Russia. Initiated in 2014 amid the annexation of Crimea and conflict in Donbas, the barrier aims to enhance security, prevent smuggling, and curb illegal crossings. Its construction supports Ukraine's efforts to assert sovereignty and protect its territorial integrity against Russian aggression.

In August 2017, a major corruption scandal rattled the project, as it became public that large amounts of the money intended to pay for the Wall project were misused and even stolen. The National Anti-Corruption Bureau (NABU) announced the arrest of several individuals involved in the building of the fortified border.

On 5 May 2021, Chief of the State Border Guard Service of Ukraine, Serhiy Deineko, said that the government continued works to fortify the country's border sections with Russia. Due to decreasing funding and rising costs, the end of construction was planned for 2025; its readiness was estimated at 40% as of the end of May 2020. As of 19 May 2021, the State Border Guard Service of Ukraine has completed 51.4% of the "Wall" project.

In December 2021, according to information provided by the State Border Guard Service at the request of Focus, the project was completed. Instead of the “Wall”, the Cabinet of Ministers approved a new program for the arrangement of the state border for UAH 36 billion.

After the start of Russia's full-scale invasion in 2022, Ukrainian media began to call for strengthening the state border with Russia. In April 2022, Dmytro Zhyvytskyi, the head of the Sumy Regional Military Administration, said that this should include fortifications along the entire border.

==== Structure ====
In 2014, the Ukrainian government announced that the defense lines will include a 60-kilometer stretch of a "non-explosive barrier," thousands of kilometers worth of trenches for personnel, armored vehicles and communication lines, and 4,000 army dugouts. The structure also includes barbed wire, watchtowers, and electronic surveillance systems. At the announcement of its completion, 403 km of anti-transportation ditches were arranged, 332 km of rocky roads, 149 road crossings over ravines, 99 km of metal fences, and 62 kilometers of Egoza concertina barriers were built. In April-June 2022, several more engineering structures were planned to be completed. Four strongholds and 9 firing positions were set up at the state border in Kharkiv region, and 9 video monitoring and alarm systems were built. A similar mechanism was also installed in Luhansk region.

==== Efficiency ====
Despite the defences, Russia was able to cross the border and conduct fast paced mechanized advances in border areas. In September 2022, after a counteroffensive by Ukrainian troops reached the border with Russia, Vsevolod Kozhemiako, commander of the Charter volunteer unit, published a photo of the damaged structures of the project.

=== Zaluzhny line ===
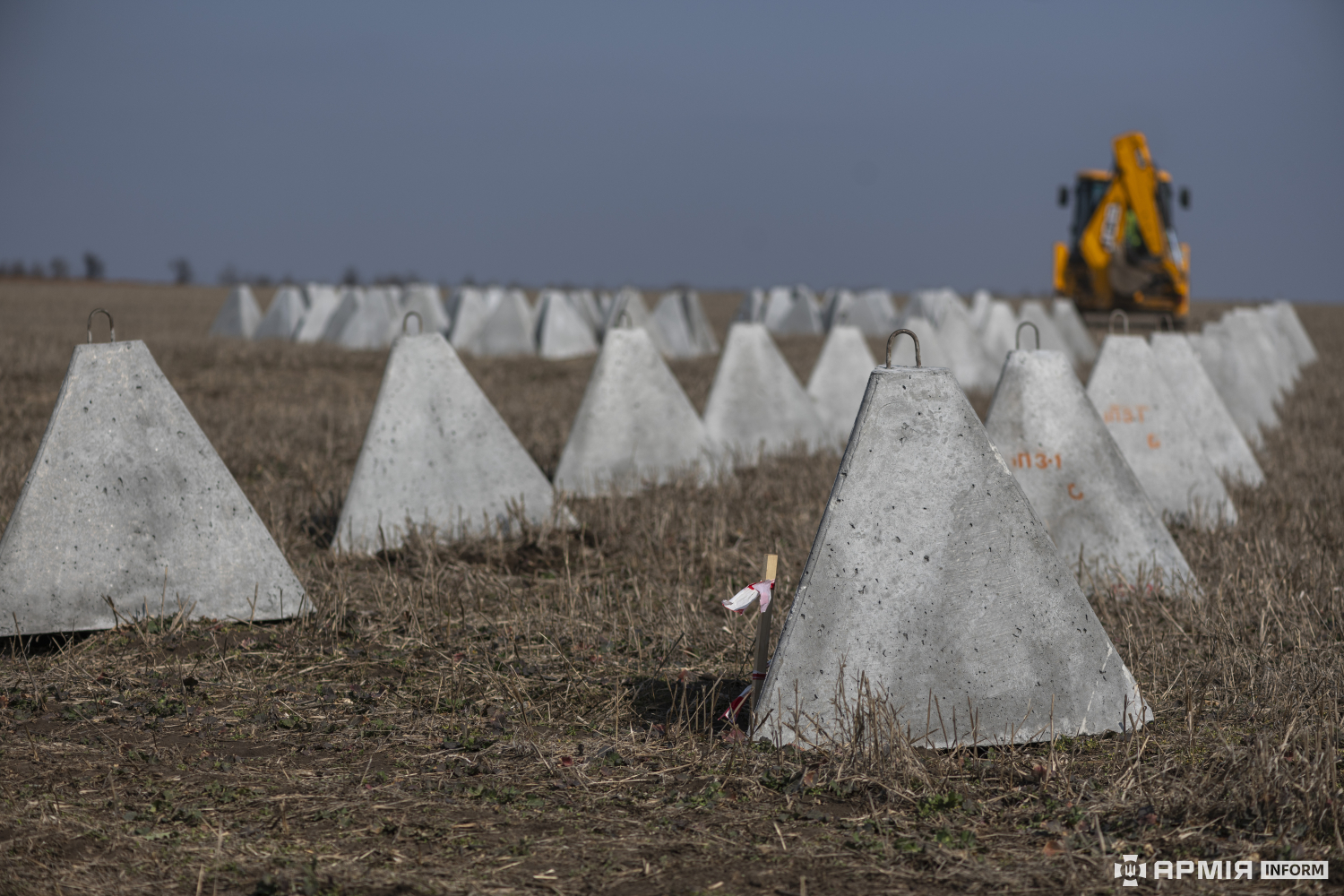
Dragon's teeth in Zaporizhzhia Oblast, 2024

In December 2023, there were talks of starting construction on the Zaluzhny line, named after the former Commander-in-Chief of the Armed Forces of Ukraine, Valerii Zaluzhnyi. Zelensky said that a new phase of the war had started, which coincided with the culmination of the poor results of the Ukrainian counter-offensive in 2023. Urged by the US, Zelensky approved the construction effort in a video released on the 30th of November. US Secretary of Defence Lloyd Austin went to Kyiv to confer with Zelensky and Russian media suggested that the Ukrainians would receive money only for defensive purposes from that time onwards. Zelensky told French media on 12 March 2024 that $520 million had been allocated for this purpose. 2,000km of fortifications would be dug in at Avdiivka, Maryinka, Kupyansk, Lyman and in border regions with Russia and Belarus.

== Khrenin Line ==
The "Khrenin Line", named for Belarusian Defense Minister Viktor Khrenin, is located near Homel in Belarus, 20 kilometres (12 mi) from the Belarus–Ukraine border. It is about 2 kilometres (1.2 mi) in total, and includes dragon's teeth anti-tank barriers and trenches.

== See also ==
- Russia–Ukraine barrier, attempt by Ukrainian government to build a defense line prior to 2022
- Panther–Wotan line, built by Nazi Germany in the region during the Second World War
