= Toblerone line =

Defensive fortifications of Vaud, Switzerland from WWII

Coordinates: 46°24′7.8″N 6°16′48.6″E

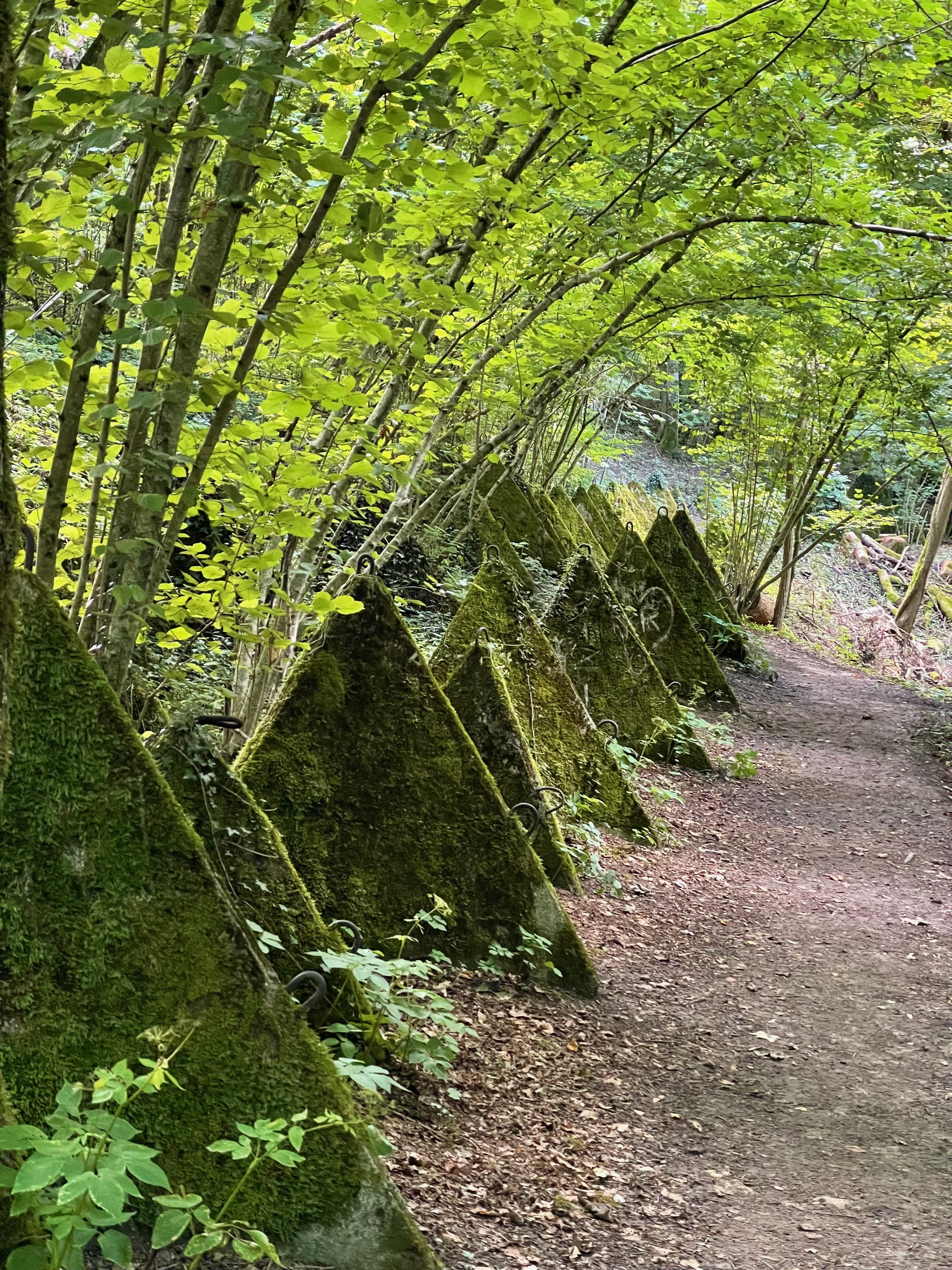
Triangular concrete anti-tank blocks of the Toblerone Line, named for their resemblance to the Toblerone chocolate bar

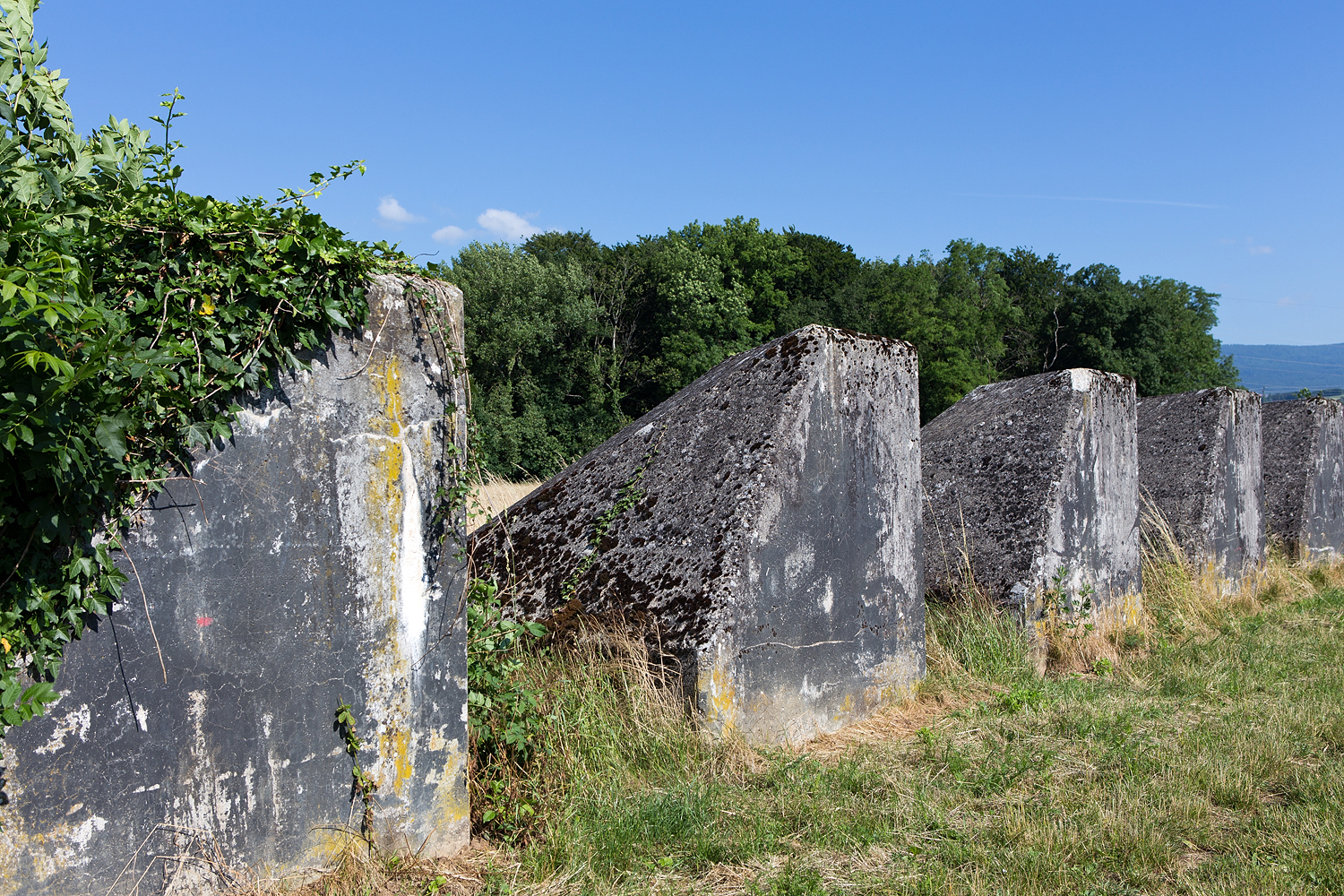
Toblerone Line concrete blocks near Lake Geneva in Gland, Switzerland

The Toblerone line is a 10 km long defensive line made of "dragon's teeth" fortifications built during the Second World War between Bassins and Prangins, in the Canton of Vaud, Switzerland. Such defensive blocks can be found throughout Switzerland, though more commonly in border areas. Their purpose was to stop tank invasions. The 2,700 nine-tonne concrete blocks that make up the defences are similar to the shape of the Toblerone chocolate bar, which gave its name to the line. Since the line has been left to nature since its construction, it was decided to keep these concrete blocks and to make a hiking trail along their route.

The line included several fortresses, the most well-known being the "Villa Rose" in Gland, Switzerland, a camouflaged bunker now operating as a museum.

== History ==
The Toblerone line is a part of the Promenthouse defence line, which more or less follows the watercourse of the brooklets Promenthouse and Serine. First reconnaissance took place in 1936, in 1937, construction began by ramming railway tracks into the ground to reinforce the banks of the watercourse. In autumn 1939, first contracts for the construction of bunkers were made. The position was constantly upgraded throughout the war and eventually comprised a virtually continuous line of tank blocks.

The Toblerone line was a central element of Switzerland’s wartime defense strategy, designed to slow any potential invasion from Nazi Germany. It marked the first natural barrier likely to be encountered by an invading force from the west, particularly given the difficulty of defending Geneva, which was nearly encircled by Nazi-occupied France. The line included hidden fortifications such as the Villa Rose, which housed 20 to 25 soldiers during the war. These troops remained in isolation for extended periods, equipped with anti-tank weaponry and supported only by military communications.

== Villa Rose ==
The Villa Rose is a fortress disguised as a residential house and forms part of the Toblerone Line defences in Gland. Constructed during the period 1933–1945, it was positioned to block the Route Suisse, then the main road from Geneva into the Swiss Plateau until 1964. The bunker retains its original 1940 armament, including an anti-tank gun and machine guns, and contains a reconstructed soldier’s quarters in the attic. Since 2000, it has operated as a museum and holds a collection of Swiss wartime newsreels from 1939 to 1945. The site is linked to the Sentier des Toblerones, a walking trail that follows the line’s anti-tank defences.

== Gallery ==
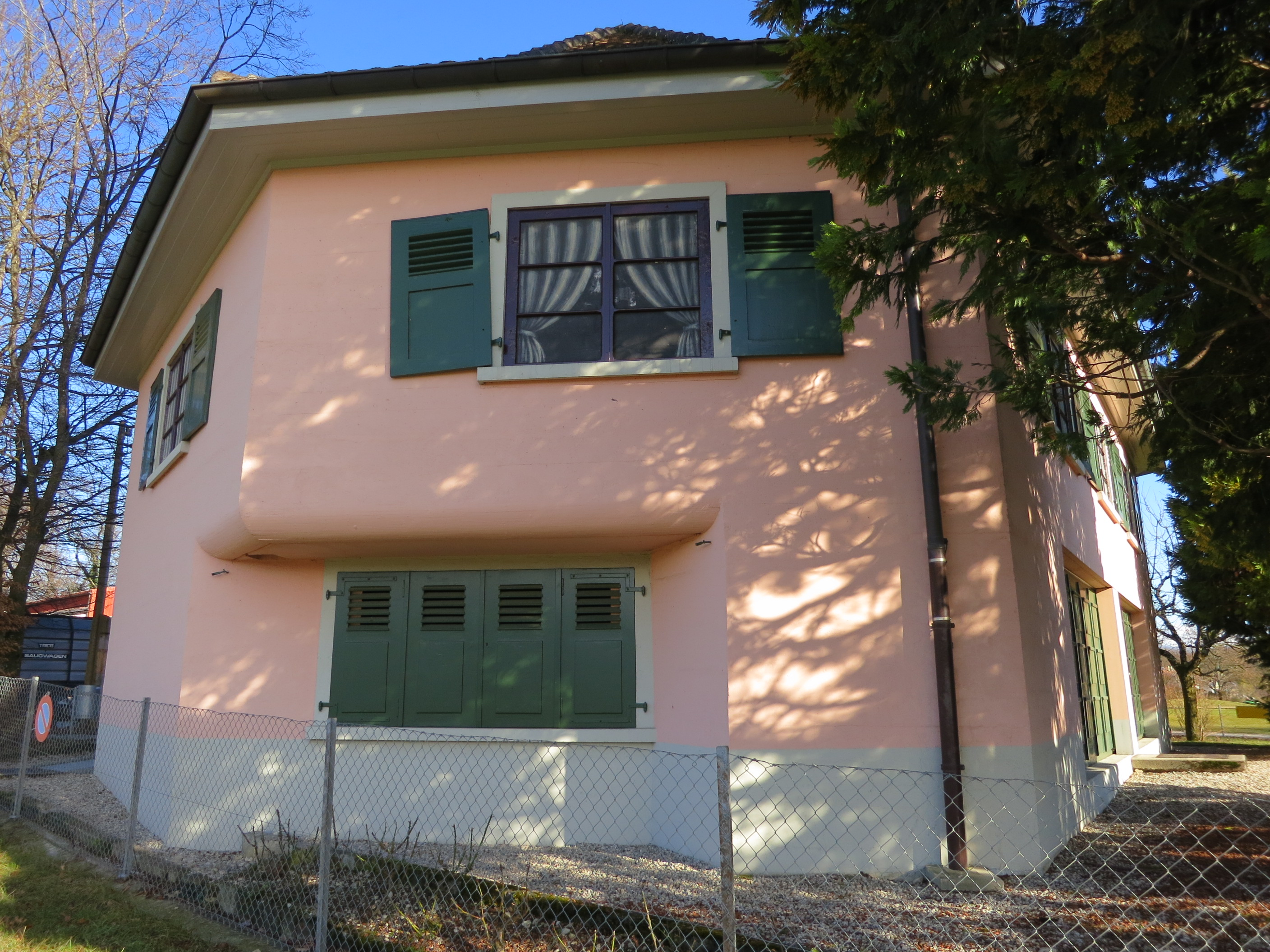
The "Villa Rose" fortress

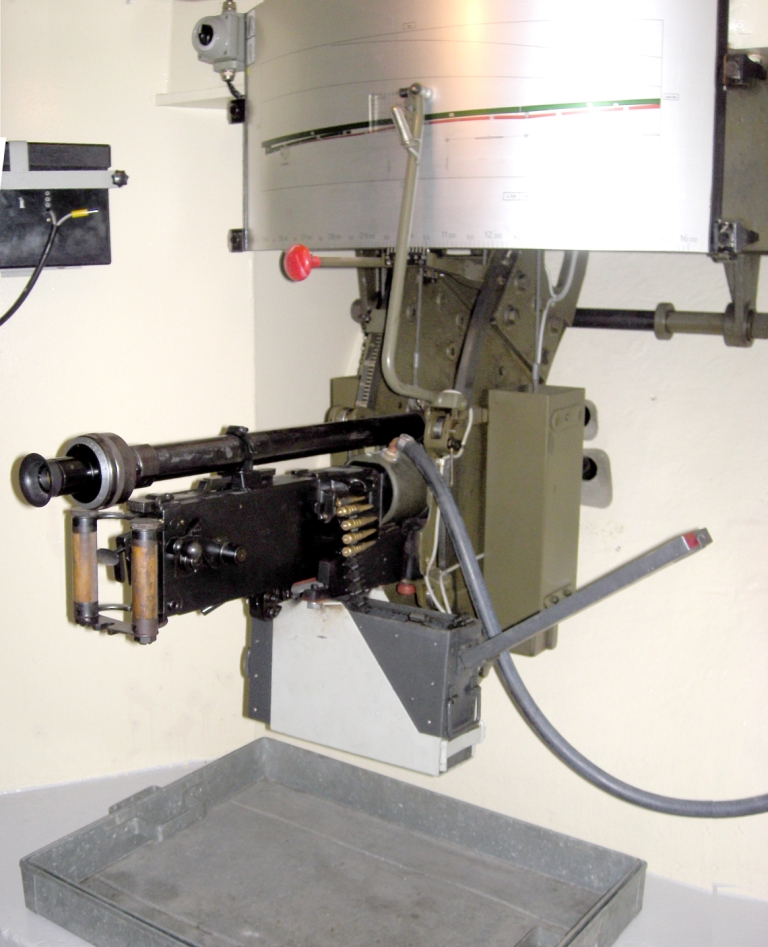
Maxim Machine Gun Model 11 on a mount inside the "Villa Rose" fortress

== See also ==
- Maginot Line
- Swiss military history
- Switzerland during the World Wars
