= Dragon's teeth (fortification) =

Pyramidal anti-tank obstacles

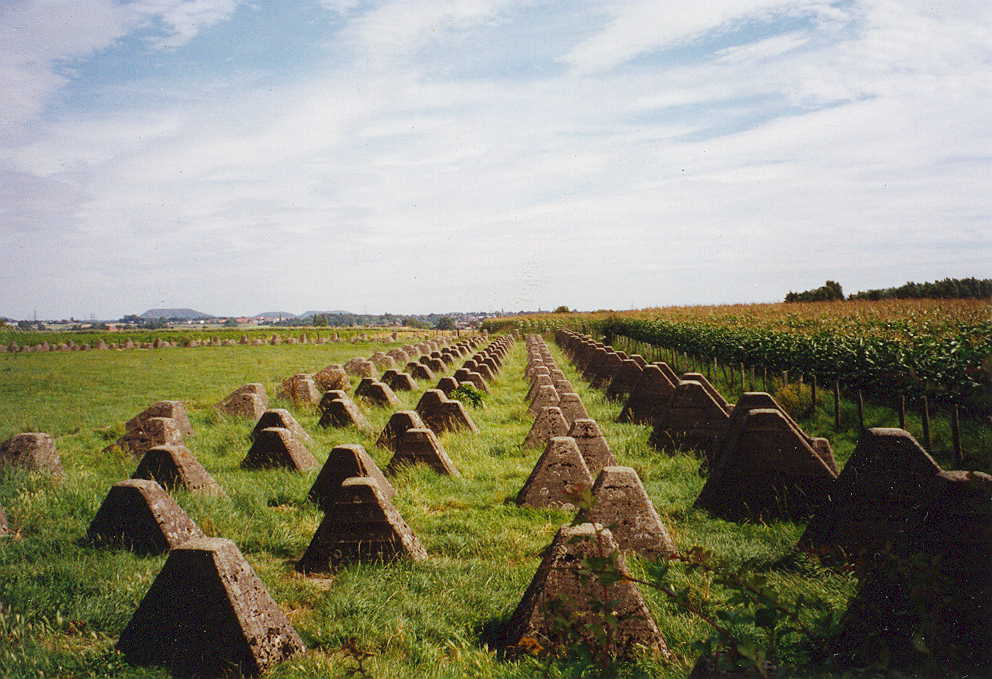
Dragon's teeth near Aachen, Germany, part of the Siegfried Line

Dragon's teeth are pyramidal anti-tank obstacles of reinforced concrete first used during the Second World War to impede the movement of tanks and mechanised infantry. The idea was to slow down and channel tanks into killing zones where they could easily be disposed of by anti-tank weapons.

They were employed extensively, particularly on the Siegfried Line.

== World War II ==
Dragon's teeth were used by several armies in the European theatre. The Germans made extensive use of them on the Siegfried Line and the Atlantic Wall. Typically, each tooth was 90 to 120 cm (3 to 4 ft) tall.

Land mines were often laid between teeth, and further obstacles were constructed along the lines of teeth, such as barbed wire to impede infantry or diagonally-placed steel beams to further hinder tanks. Many were laid in the United Kingdom in 1940–1941, as part of the effort to strengthen the country's defences against a possible German invasion:

Behind minefields were the dragon's teeth. They rested on a concrete mat between ten and thirty meters wide, sunk a meter or two into the ground (to prevent any attempt to tunnel underneath them and place explosive charges). On top of the mat were the teeth themselves, truncated pyramids of reinforced concrete about a meter in height in the front row, to two meters high in the back. They were staggered and spaced in such a manner that a tank could not drive through. Interspersed among the teeth were minefields, barbed wire, and pillboxes that were virtually impregnable by the artillery and set in such a way as to give the Germans crossing fire across the entire front. The only way to take those pillboxes was for infantry to get behind them and attack the rear entry. But behind the first row of pillboxes and dragon's teeth, there was a second, and often a third, and sometimes a fourth.

Due to the huge numbers laid and their durable construction, many thousands of dragon's teeth can still be seen today, especially in the remains of the Siegfrieds.

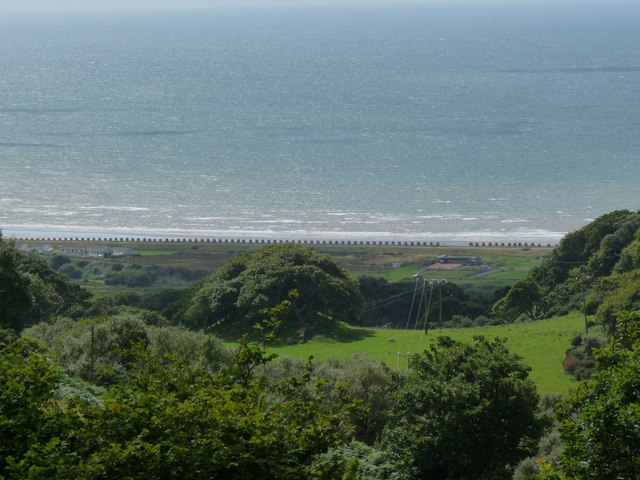
World War II dragon's teeth at Fairbourne Beach, Wales, in 2009, designed to stop tanks landing

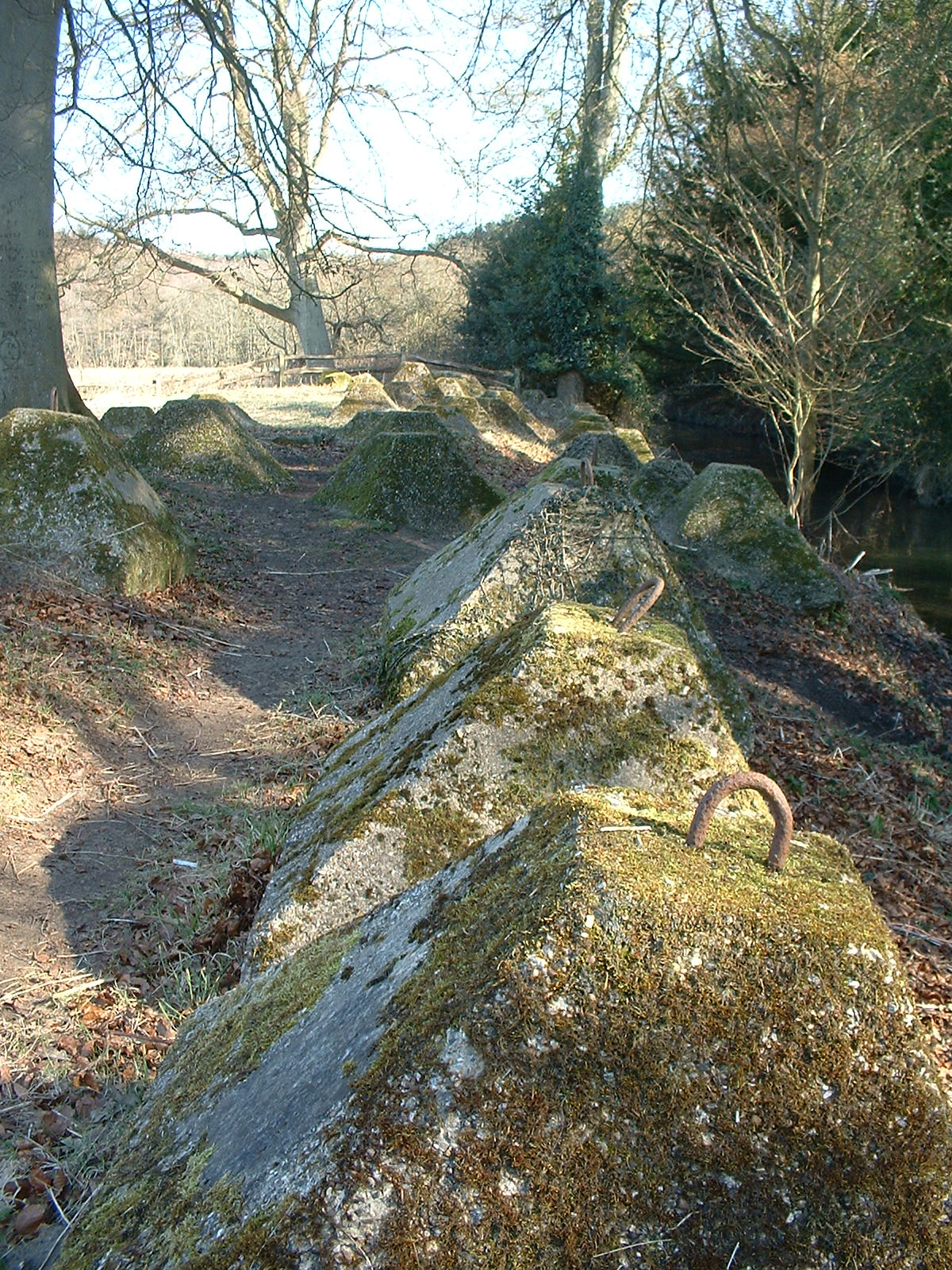
Dragon's teeth on GHQ Line near Waverley Abbey, Surrey in 2006

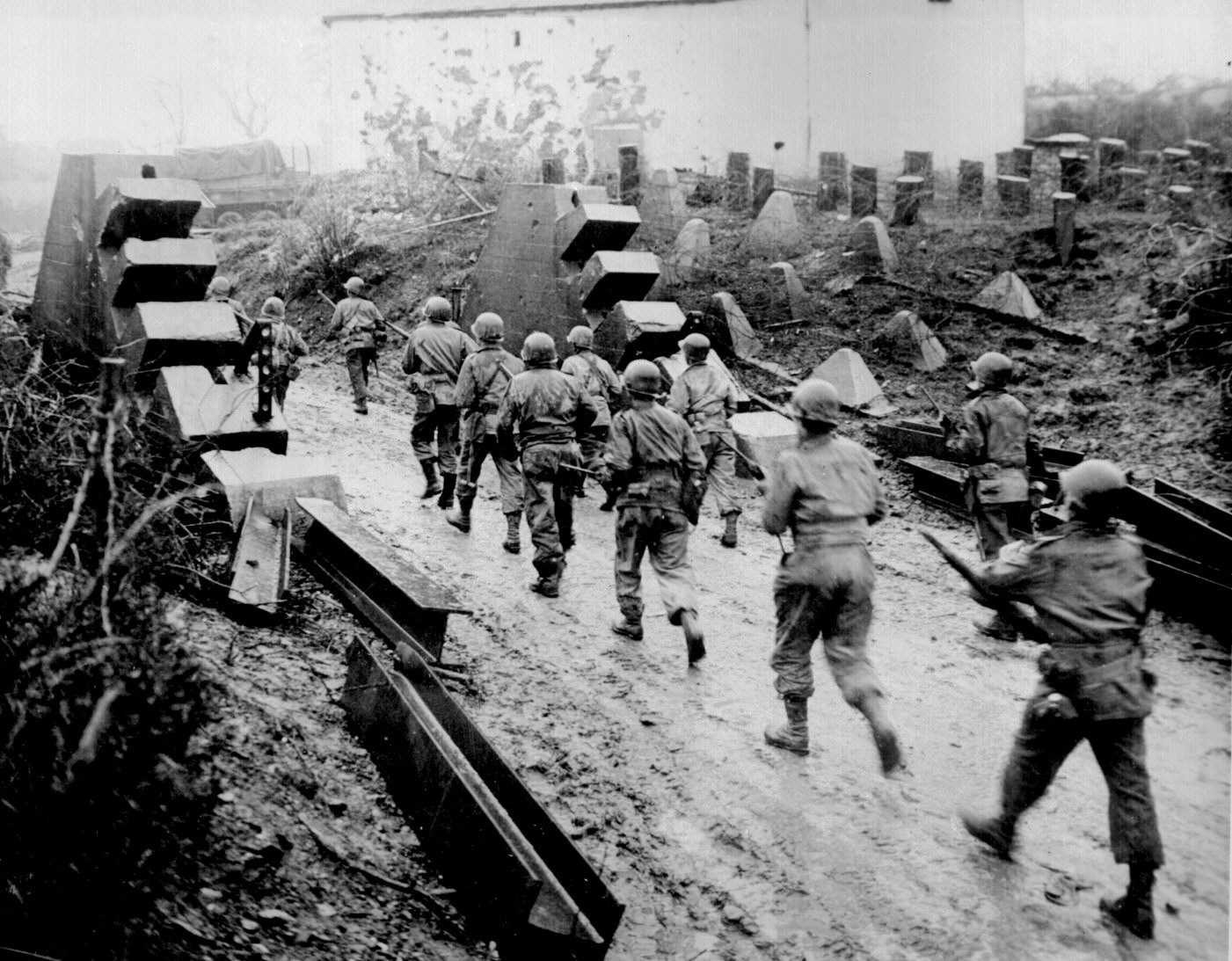
United States Army troops passing through dragon's teeth on the Siegfried Line in 1944.

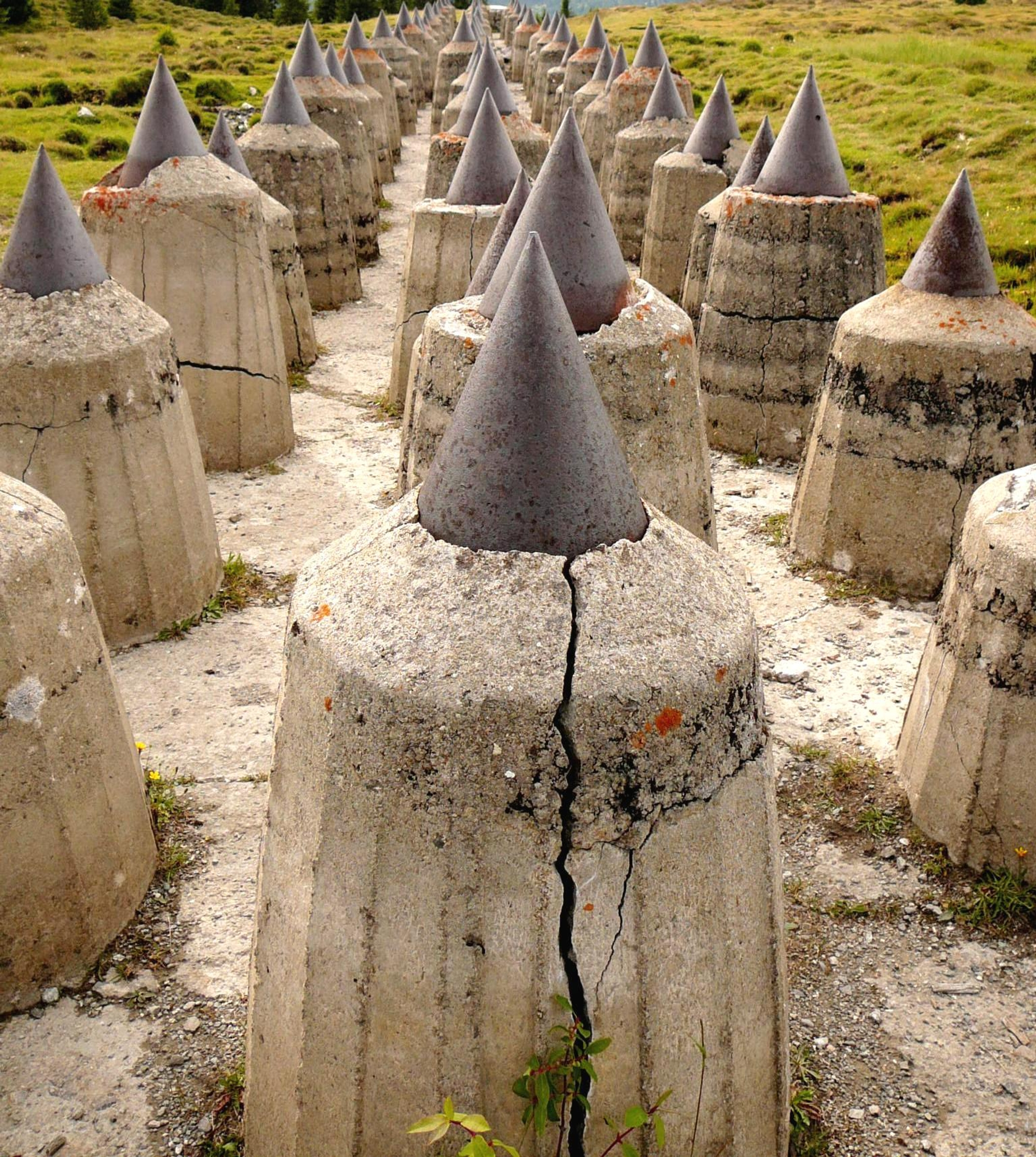
Dragon's teeth from the Alpine Wall

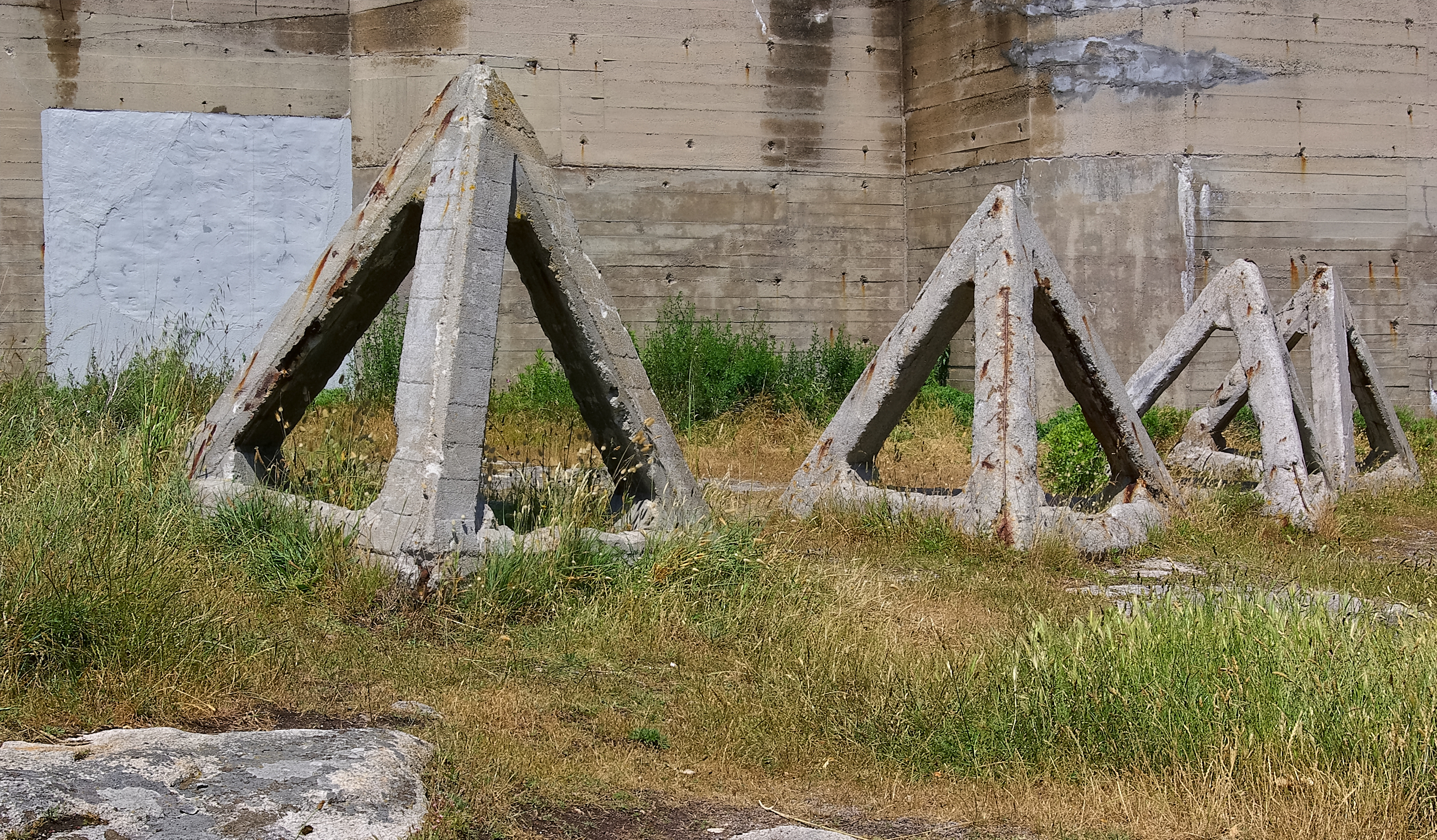
Hollow examples at the Grand Blockhaus, France

== Post World War II ==
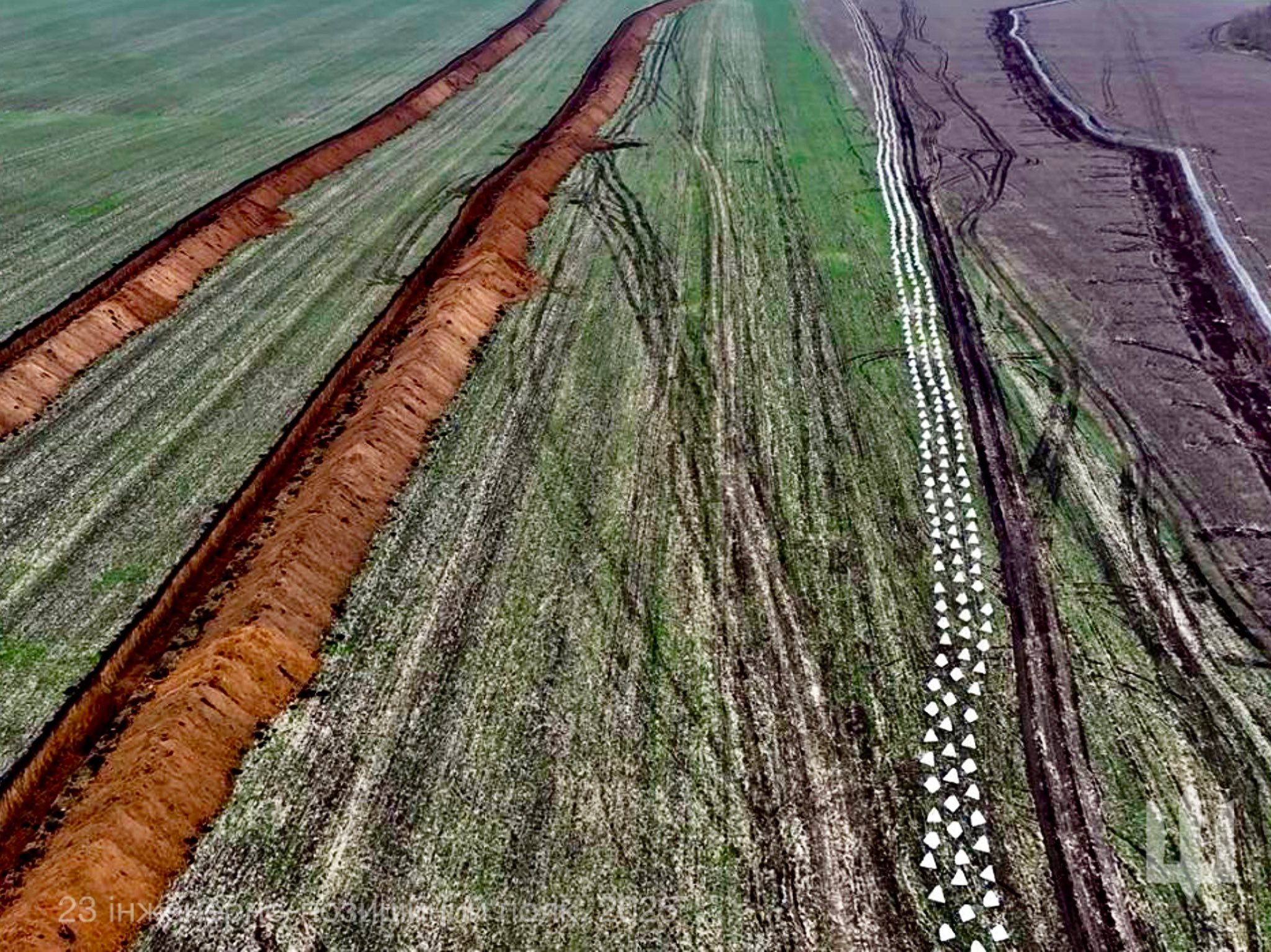
Lines of dragon's teeth alongside berms and anti-tank trenches, Ukraine, 2025

The term has survived into the present day and can be used to describe a line of posts or bollards set into the ground to deter vehicle access, for example in rural car parking areas or alongside roads.

=== Switzerland ===
- Switzerland continues to maintain lines of dragon's teeth in certain strategic areas. In military jargon, these constructions can be referred to as "Toblerone lines", after the chocolate bar.

=== Korea ===
- Korea – Dragon's teeth are present in some areas along the Korean Demilitarized Zone borderline.

=== Germany ===
- Germany – They were used on the East German side of the Berlin Wall.

=== Yugoslavia ===
- Yugoslavia – Some countries after the breakup of Yugoslavia have movable dragon's teeth, positioned at roadsides at strategic locations, which can be lifted and placed on the roads.

=== Russia ===
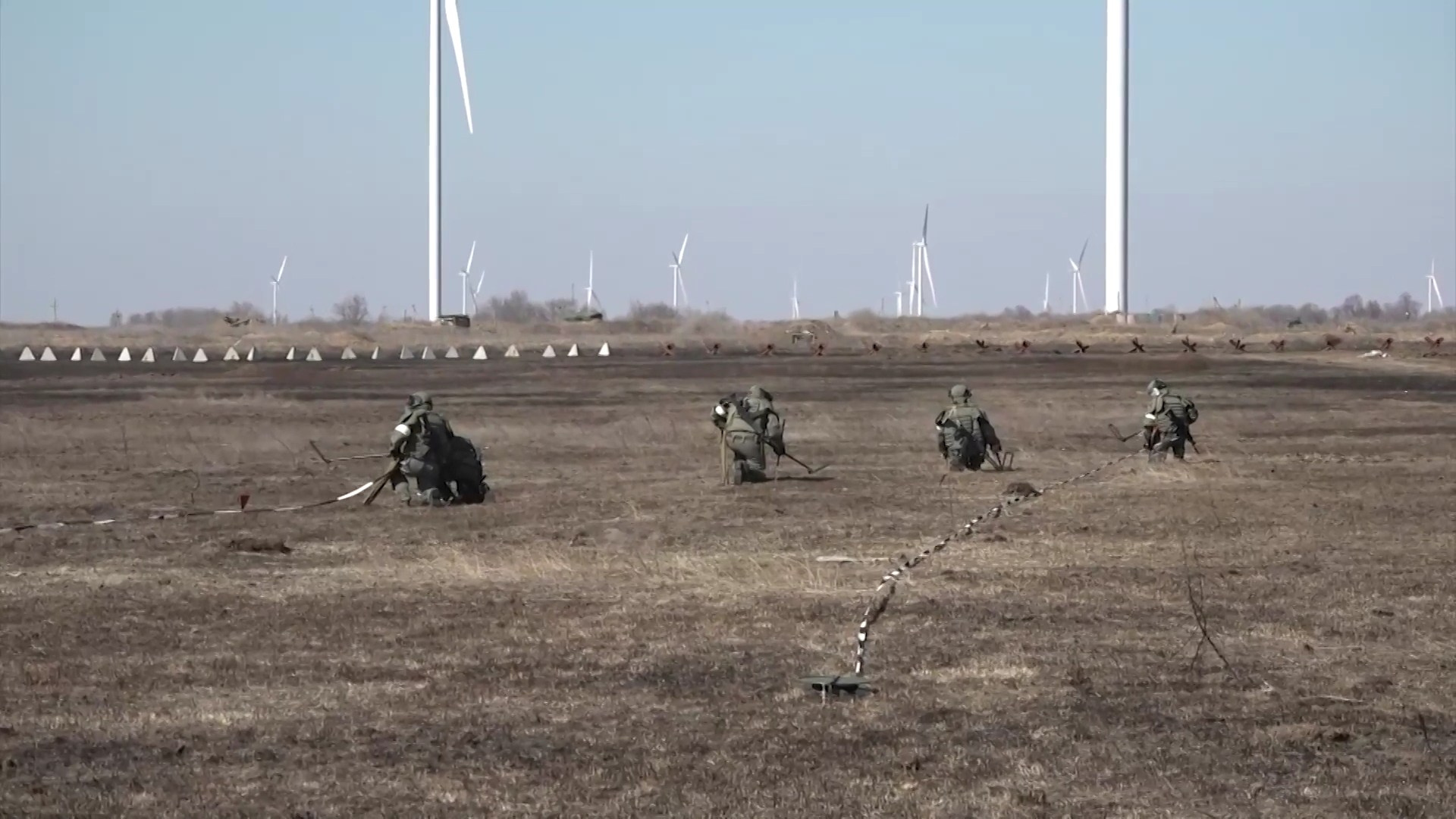
Russian anti-tank obstacles near the horizon, Kherson Oblast, May 2022. Dragon's teeth on the left, Czech hedgehogs on the right

In Belgorod Oblast, defensive lines of dragon's teeth were constructed in October 2022 under the supervision of the Wagner Group along the Russia–Ukraine border, intended as a second line of defense alongside trenches and a trained militia in the event the Ukrainian Armed Forces break through the Russian border in the Russo-Ukrainian war.

A series of dragon's teeth fortifications named the Wagner Line have also been built by the Wagner Group in Russian-occupied Hirske in Luhansk Oblast. The Wagner Group aims to complete the Wagner Line in Russian-controlled Ukrainian territories as far east as Kreminna and as far south as Svitlodarsk.

In November 2022, the Russians were seen by Ukrainian journalists to have fortified the region around Melitopol with dragon's teeth lines. At least one journalist, quoting someone at the Institute for the Study of War, called these the Surovikin Line. The dragon's teeth were only a component of the echeloned Russian defenses in southern Kherson: minefields, anti-tank ditches, dugouts, and trenches added to the complex. A number of Belarusian firms supplied Russian troops with dragon's teeth. Dragon's teeth were also set up in the area of Mariupol, Nikolske and Staryi Krym around the same time.

=== Poland ===
In February 2023, Poland began to fortify its border with Kaliningrad with dragon's teeth, due to concern over commenters like Dmitry Medvedev, who floated the idea of "pushing back" Polish borders during the one-year anniversary of the 2022 Russian invasion of Ukraine. A few weeks later the Polish authorities decided to fortify their border with Belarus too. This is additional to the border fence the Poles completed in October 2022.

=== Baltic states ===
A 1,000-mile (1,600 km) stretch of the borders of Estonia, Latvia and Lithuania is to be fortified with dragon's teeth in the project Baltic Defence Line.

== See also ==
- Anti-Trespass Panels
- Caltrop
- Czech hedgehog
- Dragon's teeth (mythology)
- Jersey barrier
- Spike strip
- Toblerone line
- Wave-dissipating concrete block
