= Gawri Wall =

Sasanian and Parthian defensive fortification

- دیواری گەوری

General information
- Country: Iran
- Coordinates: 34°26′39.3″N 45°46′52.2″E

The Gawri Wall (Kurdish: دیواری گەوری, Persian: دیوار گَوری) was a defensive fortification built and in use between the 4th and 6th centuries during the rule of the Sasanians and Parthians. The structure's ruins, which run the length of around 71 miles (114 kilometres), are located in Sarpol-e Zahab County near the Iran–Iraq border.

== 2019 archaeological discovery ==
Though the site was known to the local population living in its vicinity, it was unknown to the archaeological community until its discovery was published in the journal Antiquity in August 2019. Locals have long referred to the fortification as the Gawri Wall.

== See also ==
- Great Wall of Gorgan
- Wall of Tammisha
- Khurasan Wall
- Sasanian defense lines
- Median Wall
