= Baltic Defence Line =

Proposed defence cooperation between the Baltic States

- Baltic states (Estonia, Latvia, Lithuania)

Site information
- Type: Defense line

Site history
- Built: 2024 – now

The Baltic Defence Line (Note: Estonian: Balti kaitsevöönd; Latvian: Baltijas aizsardzības līnija; Lithuanian: Baltijos gynybos linija.) is a defensive line of fortifications, obstacles and military installations being built by Estonia, Latvia and Lithuania. The three Baltic states, which are also members of NATO and the European Union, have been building the defensive line along their borders with Russia and Belarus.

The Baltic Defence Line was announced on 19 January 2024, in a joint meeting between the Ministers of Defence of Latvia, Estonia and Lithuania in Riga. The construction was begun the same year.

According to Baiba Braže, the Foreign Minister of Latvia, the Baltic Defence Line could take up to a decade to be completed.

== Structure ==
The Baltic Defence Line is planned to consist of anti-mobility defensive installations, such as at least six hundred bunkers across each individual national border, and natural and artificial obstacles such as forestry and rivers and anti-tank ditches along the borders of the three Baltic states.

Alongside the defensive installations, the Baltic Defence Line is to also include storage areas where defensive elements such as dragon's teeth anti-tank hedgehogs and razor wire are to be kept.

Each country has committed €60 million from their defense budgets to the project annually.

== History ==
The Baltic Defence Line was proposed in response to the Russian invasion of Ukraine in February 2022, and in fears over Russian threats to the Baltic states. The concept of defensive installations was decided at the 2022 NATO Summit in Madrid.

=== Estonia ===
As of June 2026, 28 pilot bunkers have been installed, primarily in the forests of the Setomaa region, as well as over 10 kilometers of anti-tank ditches and trenches, including over 20 thousand dragon's teeth have been dug and installed in southeastern Estonia.

The Estonian Centre for Defence Investments (ECDI) expects the entire fortification line made up of a total of 600 squad-level bunkers and 40 kilometers of anti-tank ditches and obstacles that will span the eastern border to be fully completed by the end of 2027.

=== Latvia ===
Latvia began building the fortifications in 2025. At the end of 2025, Latvia completed the construction of a 280 km fence along the Latvia–Russia border. However border infrastructure construction continued in 2026. There are plans to construct over 1000 bunkers, due to Latvia's lack of natural obstacles.

=== Lithuania ===
Instead of static fortifications, Lithuania decided to build counter-mobility engineering parks – designated storage sites near the border, prepared for rapid deployment of obstacles, including dragon's teeth, Czech hedgehogs, concrete barriers, concertina wire, anti-tank mines as well as anti-personnel mines. In June 2024, Lithuania started acquiring counter-mobility materiel for its sites near the border with Belarus and border with Kaliningrad, an exclave of Russia. As of 2026, 27 counter-mobility parks were established and fully equipped. The Ministry of National Defence proposed to further increase the number of parks to 50.

== See also ==
- East Shield
- Mannerheim Line
