= Median Wall =

Wall built to the north of Babylon

The Median Wall was a wall built to the north of the ancient city of Babylon at a point where the distance between the rivers Tigris and Euphrates decreases considerably. It was believed to have been constructed during the latter part of the reign of Nebuchadrezzar II and to have consisted of baked brick and bitumen, with centre of the wall being packed with earth. The wall was built to prevent any potential invasion by the Medes from the north — hence the name 'Median' Wall.

The ancient Greek writer Xenophon states that the wall was in existence in 401 BC in his book the Anabasis (or 'The Persian Expedition'), and described it as being 20 feet (6.1 m) wide and 100 feet (30 m) in height, and 20 parasangs in length (approximately 70 miles or 110 kilometres).

== See also ==
- Gawri Wall

== Sources ==
- Warner, Rex, trans. Xenophon - The Persian Expedition. Introduction & Notes by George Caldwell. England: Penguin Books, 1949–1972. ISBN 978-0-14-044007-2.
