= Russia–Ukraine barrier =

Ukrainian border fortification

"Project Wall"
- Fortification between Russia and Ukraine
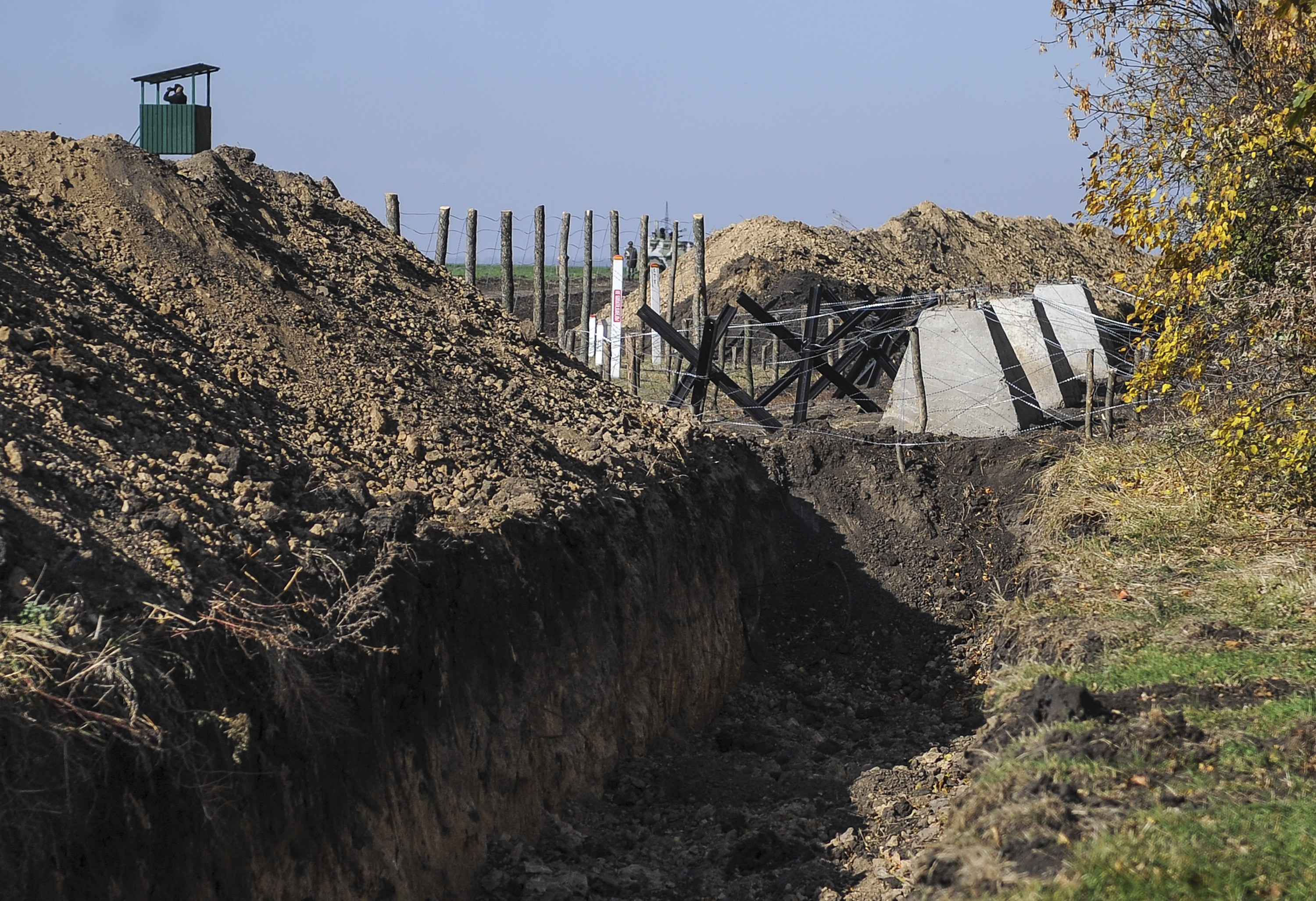
- Portion of the barrier under construction in October 2014

Site information
- Type: Border barrier
- Owner: Government of Ukraine
- Operator: Ukrainian SBGS
- Condition: Active

Site history
- Built: 2014–2022 (construction suspended due to ongoing Russian invasion)
- Built by: Ukraine
- In use: 2014–present
- Battles/wars: Russo-Ukrainian War

The Russia–Ukraine barrier, also known as the Ukrainian Wall or the European Wall (Ukrainian: Європейський вал, romanized: Yevropeiskyi val), and officially called "Project Wall" (Ukrainian: Проєкт «Стіна», romanized: Proiekt "Stina") in Ukraine, is a fortified border barrier built on the Ukrainian side of the Russia–Ukraine border. Early construction began following the outbreak of the Russo-Ukrainian War in 2014, as the Ukrainian government sought to prevent any further incursions by Russia into Ukrainian territory following the Russian annexation of Crimea and the Russian-backed separatist uprising in the Donbas. It was also aimed at helping Ukraine's position with obtaining visa-free travel to the European Union (see Ukraine–European Union relations). Former Ukrainian prime minister Arseniy Yatsenyuk presented this project on 3 September 2014, and it started officially in 2015. In June 2020, Ukraine's State Border Guard Service expected that the project would be finished by 2025. However, in a message to Focus in January 2022, they stated that the project had been completed at a cost of ₴2.5 billion.

On 24 February 2022, all remaining construction on the barrier was suspended due to the Russian invasion of Ukraine.

== History ==
Following the 2014 Russian military intervention in Ukraine, in June 2014, Ukrainian politician and business magnate Ihor Kolomoyskyi suggested that Ukraine should build a wall along the border with Russia. On 3 September 2014, Ukrainian Prime Minister Arseniy Yatsenyuk announced Ukraine would strengthen its border with Russia and called this "Project Wall". The command of Ukraine's anti-terrorist forces stated that "Two defense lines have been planned, and their main goal is to prevent the infiltration by the adversary into the territory of Ukraine". According to Yatsenyuk, the project was needed "to cut off Russian support for insurgents in eastern regions" and also to obtain a visa-free regime with the European Union for Ukraine. It is also an employment project. Project "Wall" was officially started on 10 September 2014.

On September 12, 2014, the Cabinet of Ministers of Ukraine allocated 100 million hryvnia for the construction of fortifications on the border with Russia and on the border with Crimea. On 18 March 2015, the Ukrainian government allocated 865 million hryvnia to build fortifications on the border between Ukraine and Russia. On 10 April 2015, Poland allocated a loan of $100 million for the modernization of the energy sector and improvement of external borders of Ukraine.

As of May 2015, a walled defense system was under construction along the Russian border in Kharkiv Oblast. The project was planned to be finished in 2018.

On 20 August 2015, it was announced that Ukraine has completed 10% of the fortification line, stating that roughly 180 km of anti-tank ditches had been dug, 40 km of barbed wire fence and 500 fortification obstacles had been erected. 139 million hryvnia out of 300 million allocated has been used for construction of the wall at this point, and that another 460 million hryvnia were budgeted for 2016.

In August 2017, it became public that large amounts of the money intended to pay for the Wall project were misused and even stolen. The National Anti-Corruption Bureau (NABU) announced the arrest of several individuals involved in the building of the fortified border.

On 5 June 2020, the State Border Guard Service of Ukraine stated that the Wall project was 40% implemented as of the end of May 2020. Since 2015, $63.6 million has been spent on the project which the Border Guard Service expected to be finished by 2025.

Head of the State Border Guard Service of Ukraine Serhii Deineko stated on 5 May 2021 that Ukraine had built 400 km of anti-tank trench, 100 km of fence and 70 km of barbed wire as part of "Project Wall". According to him, border guards were completing work on the border in Kharkiv Oblast, part of the work was performed in Chernihiv Oblast, one site was completed in Luhansk Oblast, and in Sumy Oblast so far only design and survey works were underway.

On 24 February 2022, the construction of the barrier was temporarily stopped when Russia invaded Ukraine.

== See also ==
- 2022 Russian invasion of Ukraine
- Russia–Ukraine border
- Russo-Ukrainian War
- Russia–Ukraine relations
- Ukraine–European Union relations
- Ukraine–NATO relations
