= Trench warfare =

Land warfare involving static fortification of lines

Trench warfare is a type of land warfare using occupied lines largely comprising military trenches, in which combatants are well-protected from the enemy's fire and are substantially sheltered from artillery. Although used in antiquity it fully developed in the 17th century. During the American Civil War (1861–1865), particularly during the sieges of Vicksburg and Petersburg, modern firepower clashed with outdated infantry tactics. Soldiers began digging in to avoid the deadly shelling. This tactical shift signaled the end of classic open-field battles. This development ultimately reached its most extreme and deadly form in World War I (1914–1918). Through the combined use of machine guns, rapid-fire artillery, and barbed wire, the front lines—particularly on the Western Front—became frozen in a kilometer-long, deeply echeloned system of trenches. The trench was now no longer merely a means of siege but, as a defensive infrastructure, determined the entire course of the industrialized war of attrition.

== Origin ==
An early mention of the trench dates back to the 5th century B.C. by the Greek historian Thucydides in his work The History of the Peloponnesian War. Here he states: A trench was dug all round the temple and the consecrated ground, and the earth thrown up from the excavation was made to do duty as a wall. [...] Meanwhile the Syracusans marched out and began a second stockade, starting from the city, across the middle of the marsh, digging a trench alongside to make it impossible for the Athenians to carry their wall down to the sea. Furthermore, Aristotle, in Nicomachean Ethics, states that "generals" drew their soldiers in front of the trenches.

A more general use of trenches can be found in the accounts of Roman historians. Among them are Polybius who refers to trenches several times in his work about the Punic wars and Flavius Josephus mentioning the use of trenches during the First Jewish-Roman War. The most comprehensive report comes from Caesar. In De Bello Gallico he describes in detail the construction of trenches during the Siege of Alesia. In order to protect the soldiers working on the main siege constructions a 20 feet wide trench was dug. Additionally two further inner trenches each 15 feet broad and 15 feet deep were dug and flooded.

Until the early modern period, trenches served primarily as obstacles e.g., by filling them with water, against enemy attacks. In the 17th century the Ottomans had developed a system of parallels and saps(trenches running zigzag towards the enemy). Placing all the infantry into those trenches, this system would've given the besiegers protection against the enemy artillery. Although there had been earlier examples of trench parallels in western Europe, in the second half of the 17th century the French military engineer Sébastien Le Prestre de Vauban adopted this successful system. His system envisioned three parallel trenches that were connected via zig-zagging approach trenches. The trenches usually measured four to five feet in depth and six to twelve feet in width. Gabions were fitted to the front of the trench parallels serving as the trenches' parapets. Sometimes ledges were added to the parallels as firing platforms for the infantry assigned to the trenches. The sloping rear sides of the parallels made sure that the besieging troops could retreat in the event of a garrison sortie. Lodgements as well as redoubts were constructed to serve as assembly points and to house troops and workers.

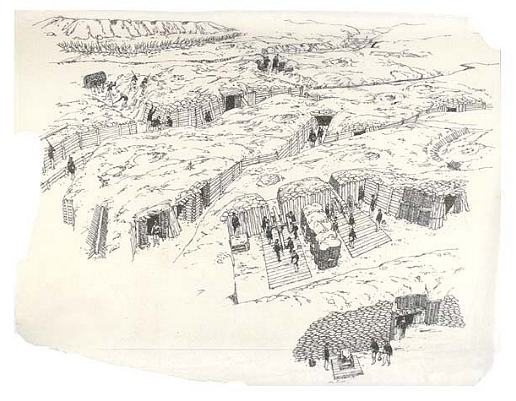
Trenches at the Siege of Vicksburg 1863

== American Civil War ==
During the American Civil War, particularly during the Overland and Petersburg campaigns, an early form of trench warfare, which would come to define World War I, developed. Although the trenches often appeared to merge into one another to on-site observers, the Union fortifications were essentially divided into three levels: the rear area, the main line of battle, and the front area with firing holes on both sides. The trenches were dug wide enough for soldiers to sit or stand in them. Toward the enemy, slightly raised logs were placed to protect the soldiers' heads and shoulders while they fired. At regular intervals, there were forts and batteries made of wood and earth to house artillery and siege mortars. Many positions, especially forts and batteries, had so-called bomb-proofs. These were deep holes in the ground, reinforced with tree trunks and covered with wood and earth, designed to provide protection against artillery bombardments. As there were no barb wire or other obstacles that would effectively have stopped an attacker the main advantage for the defender were the open glacis that had to be crossed. This would give the defender enough time to fire as many shots as possible at close range from relative cover and demoralize the attacker before he reaches the objective.

== First World War ==
By 1914, rapid-firing artillery like the "French 75", machine guns, and high explosive fragmentation rounds gave defenders an overwhelming advantage over advancing infantry and cavalry, outstripping existing tactical doctrines. Major armies adopted differing approaches: France relied on aggressive speed (Attaque à outrance), the Germans on firepower with howitzers, and the British on pragmatism. None fully anticipated the impact of defences in depth, assuming artillery could suppress entrenched troops. Following the First Battle of the Aisne, mutual flanking attempts expanded into the "Race to the Sea", producing a continuous trench line from Switzerland to the North Sea. By late October 1914, the Western Front solidified into a stalemated war of attrition. Without open flanks, costly frontal assaults became inevitable, resulting in massive casualties for both attackers and defenders as reserves were committed to counter-attacks and artillery bombardments. This static warfare endured until the German Spring Offensive in March 1918, with similar conditions occurring on other fronts such as Italy and Gallipoli. Additionally, military logistics severely restricted operations. Unprecedented ammunition consumption meant reliance on railheads, as horse-drawn transport could not support deep advances. This logistical bottleneck prevented operational breakthroughs until the widespread motorization of World War II.

Trenches of the 11th Cheshire Regiment at Ovillers-la-Boisselle, on the Somme, July 1916. One sentry keeps watch while the others sleep. Photo by Ernest Brooks

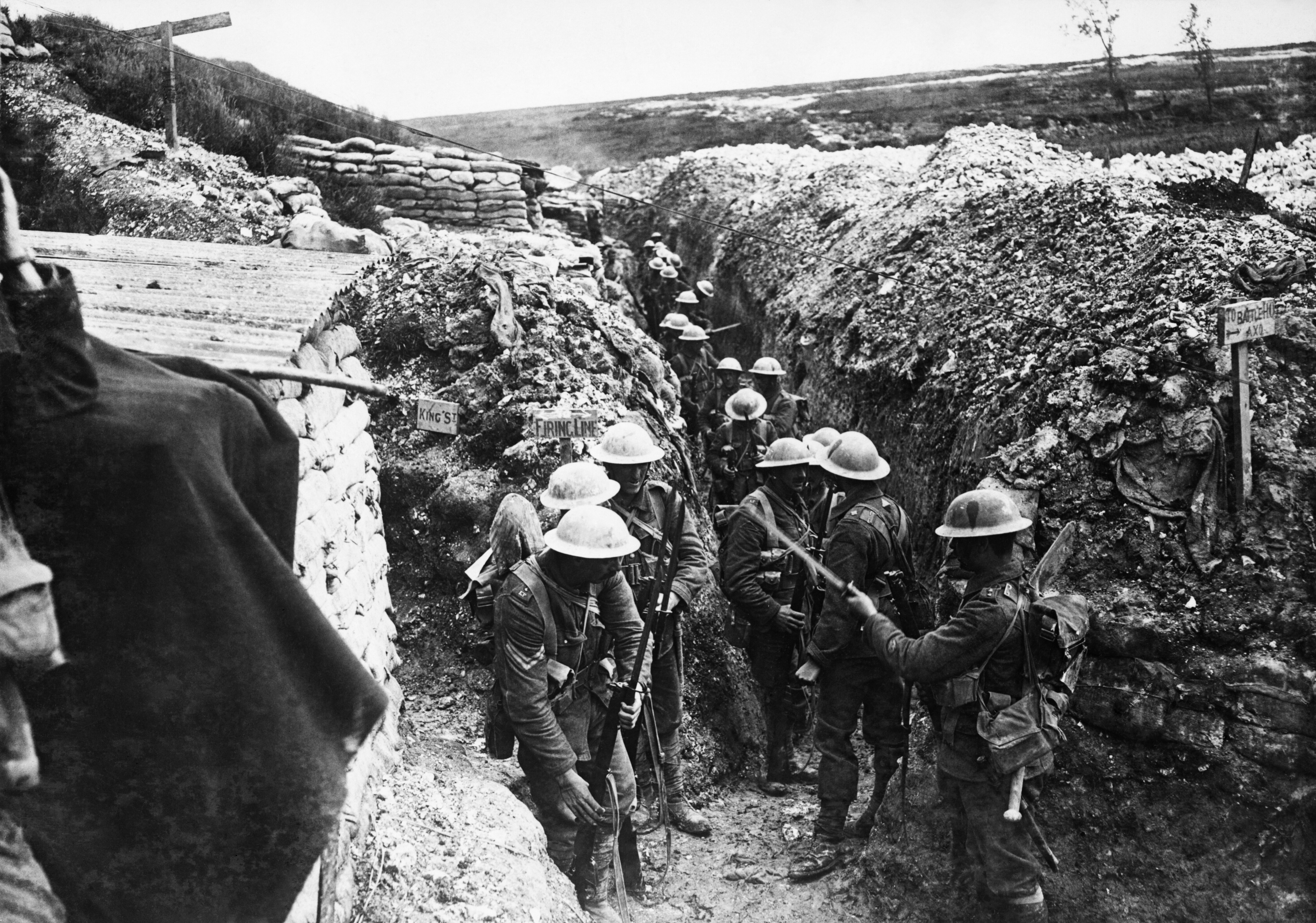
1st Lancashire Fusiliers, in communication trench near Beaumont Hamel, Somme, 1916. Photo by Ernest Brooks

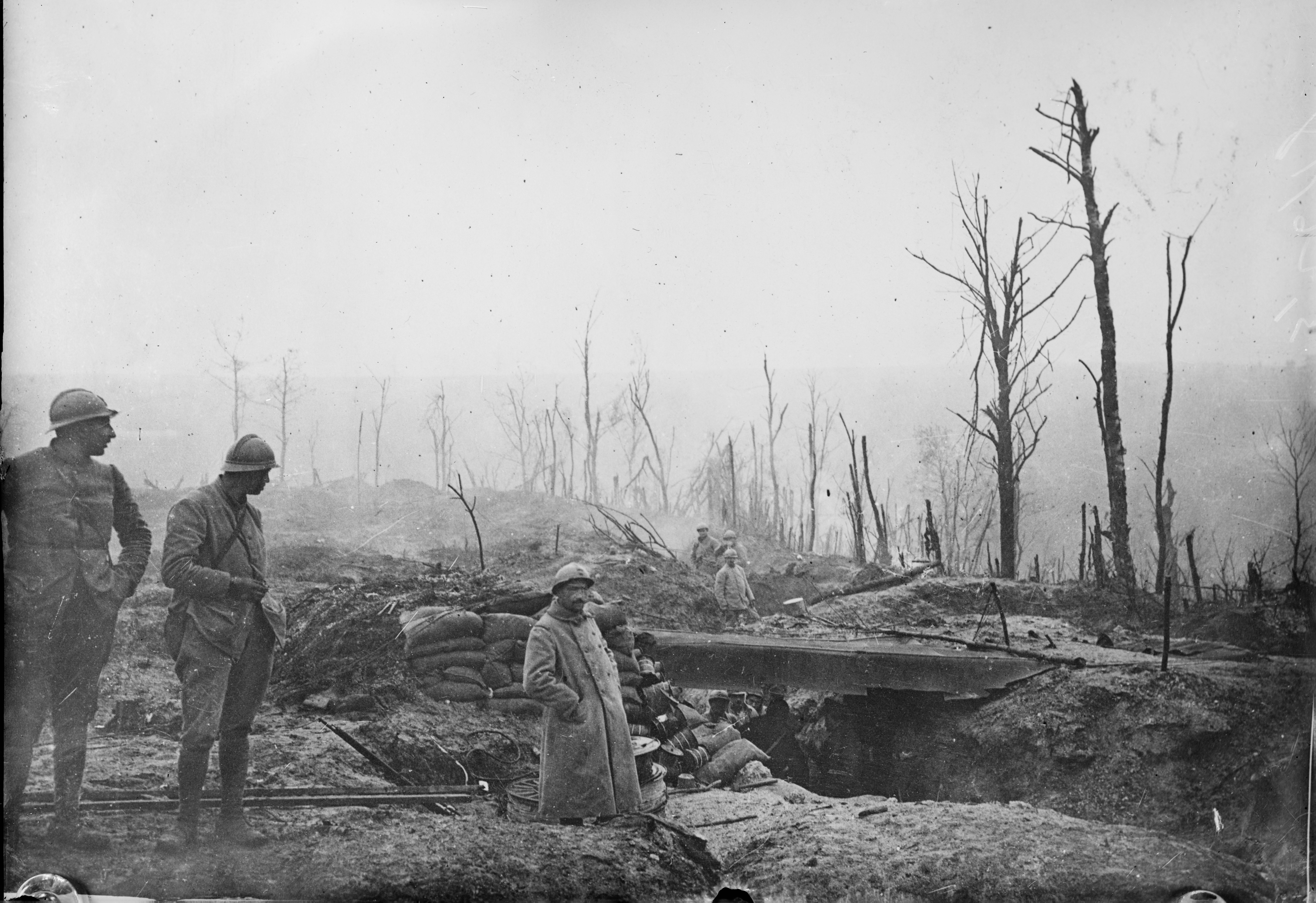
French trench in northeastern France

== Construction ==
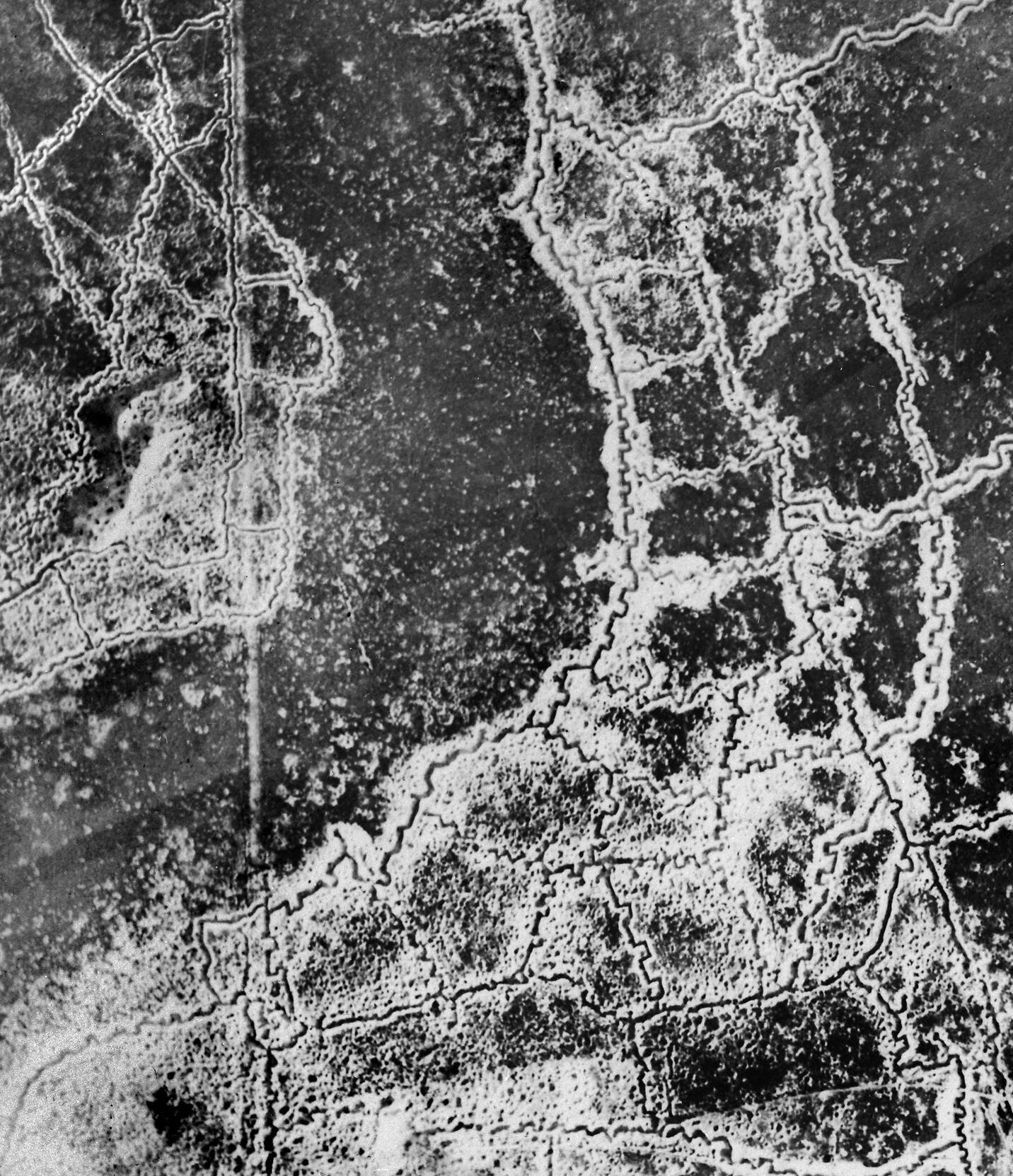
Aerial view of opposing trench lines between Loos and Hulluch, July 1917. German trenches at the right and bottom, British at the top-left.

Early World War I trenches were simple, lacking traverses, and packed with troops based on pre-war doctrine, leading to heavy casualties. Defenders soon reduced frontline density and added barbed wire obstacles.Improvised trenches quickly grew into deep, interlocking defensive works with shell-proof dugouts. Well-developed trenches were dug at least 2.5 m (8 ft) deep. Trenches featured a front parapet with a fire step and a rear parados to protect against rear blast. Walls were revetted with sandbags, wire mesh, or wood, while floors used duckboards over drainage channels. Corrugated metal roofs provided shrapnel protection. Protection from snipers prompted the use of armoured loopholes and trench periscopes, as well as the periscope rifle used heavily at Gallipoli against Ottoman forces.Dugouts provided rear shelter. British dugouts reached 2.5 to 5 m (8 to 16 ft) in depth. Drawing on Russo-Japanese War studies,Keegan 1999, p. 179. German forces built concrete-reinforced, multi-story dugouts at least 4 m (12 ft) deep with ventilation and amenities.

Early trenches were underdeveloped despite existing manuals. They were dug in zigzagging patterns or divided into fire bays with traverses to prevent enfilade fire and contain shell blasts.

Engineers repair and replace trenches in training using a JCB HMEE, 2024

Standard British doctrine called for three parallel lines (front, support, and reserve, spaced 200–300 yards apart) linked by communication trenches. Temporary assembly trenches, utility "saps" into no-man's land, and rear fallback positions were also constructed. Outward bulges formed vulnerable salients. German fortifications on the Somme in 1916 featured deep, two-tiered trench systems with concrete shelters 20 feet underground, complete with multiple exits, gas curtains, and plumbing. Belts of barbed wire, razor wire, and concertina wire over 15 m (49 ft) deep stalled advancing infantry in target zones. Combined with machine-gun fire, wire obstacles caused the majority of failed assaults. Liddell Hart cited wire and machine guns as the core impediments to mobile warfare. Wire was installed at night by wiring parties using quiet screw pickets invented by the Germans. Clearing methods included artillery bombardments, stepping over wire, wire cutters (though Commonwealth cutters struggled with heavy German gauge wire), and Bangalore torpedoes.

Trench warfare created its own subterranean geography, replacing conventional infrastructure with trench lines and trench railways. Strategic high ground made minor unnamed features critical objectives, such as Hill 60. In Flanders, high water tables flooded trenches, forcing Allied troops to build above-ground breastworks from sandbags. In the Alps, trenches reached heights of 3,900 m (12,800 ft) on steep rock and glaciers, including positions on the Ortler, Adamello-Presanella, and Marmolada.Visual observation of enemy positions led to specialized innovations such as the camouflage tree.

== No man's land ==
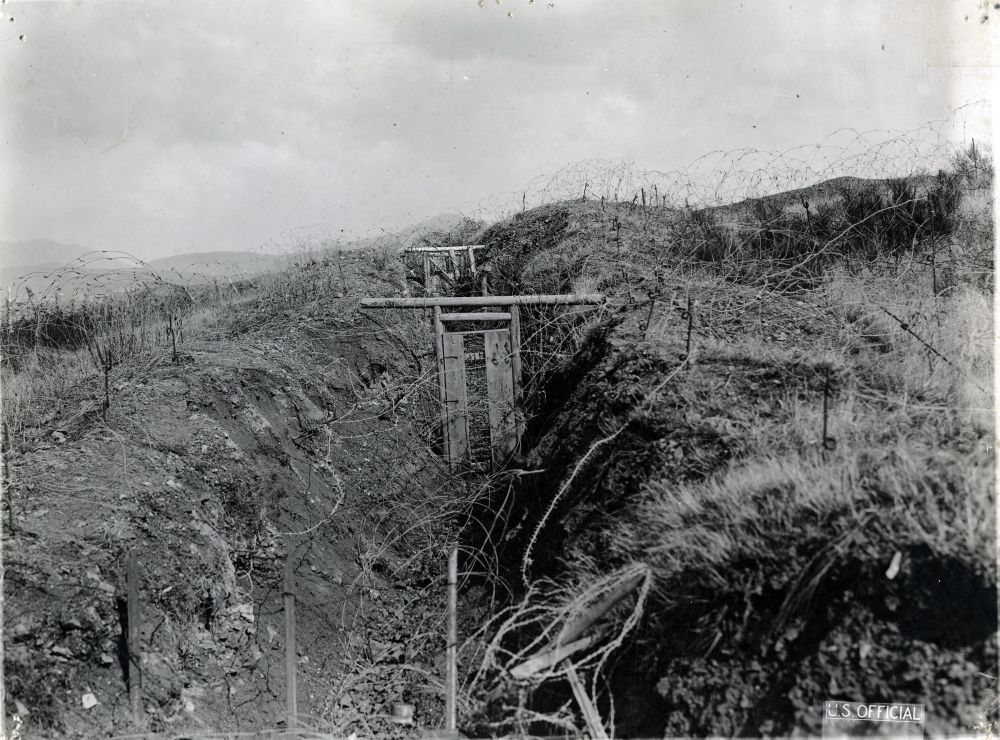
A picture of "no man's land," taken 1917–1919.

The space between the opposing trenches was referred to as "no man's land" and varied in width depending on the battlefield. On the Western Front it was typically between 90 and 275 metres (100 and 300 yd), though only 25 metres (30 yd) on Vimy Ridge.

After the German withdrawal to the Hindenburg Line in March 1917, no man's land stretched to over a kilometre in places. At the "Quinn's Post" in the cramped confines of the Anzac battlefield at Gallipoli, the opposing trenches were only 15 metres (16 yd) apart and the soldiers in the trenches constantly threw hand grenades at each other. On the Eastern Front and in the Middle East, the areas to be covered were so vast, and the distances from the factories supplying shells, bullets, concrete and barbed wire so great, trench warfare in the West European style often did not occur.

== Weaponry ==
=== Infantry weapons and machine guns ===
At the start of the First World War, the standard infantry soldier's primary weapons were the rifle and bayonet. However, static trench warfare quickly forced a shift toward hand grenades, including rifle grenades. Specialist grenadier groups were formed to attack covered positions. While German and Ottoman forces had standard grenades early on, British troops relied on improvised devices until the Mills bomb entered wide circulation in late 1915. Since standard equipment was initially ill-suited for confined spaces, troops adopted improvised close-quarter weapons like short clubs, knives, and sharpened spades. These were later replaced by standardized close-combat gear.

Specialised troops like trench sweepers (Nettoyeurs de Tranchées) cleared overrun positions and conducted raids, often choosing grenades, knives, and semi-automatic pistols. Mechanical spring- and catapult-powered grenade throwers were briefly fielded before being replaced by rifle grenades and mortars by 1916. The Germans introduced Flammenwerfer (flamethrowers) in mid-1915, which by 1917–1918 became key weapons for German Stoßtruppen (stormtroopers). Allied forces also deployed shotguns—such as modified "trench guns"—for close-quarters combat.

The heavy machine gun served as the primary defensive anchor behind barbed wire, though weapons were prone to overheating and required up to eight men to operate. Germany integrated heavy machine guns (like the Maschinengewehr 08) earlier than the Allies, who later caught up with specialized units like the British Machine Gun Corps. To improve offensive mobility, lighter weapons like the Lewis gun were widely issued by 1917. Late in the war, portable support weapons like the French Chauchat light machine gun provided advancing troops with immediate fire against entrenched positions. Additionally, early submachine guns—notably the German MP 18 and Italian Beretta M1918—were introduced specifically for rapid trench clearance and fire-and-movement assault tactics.

=== Artillery ===
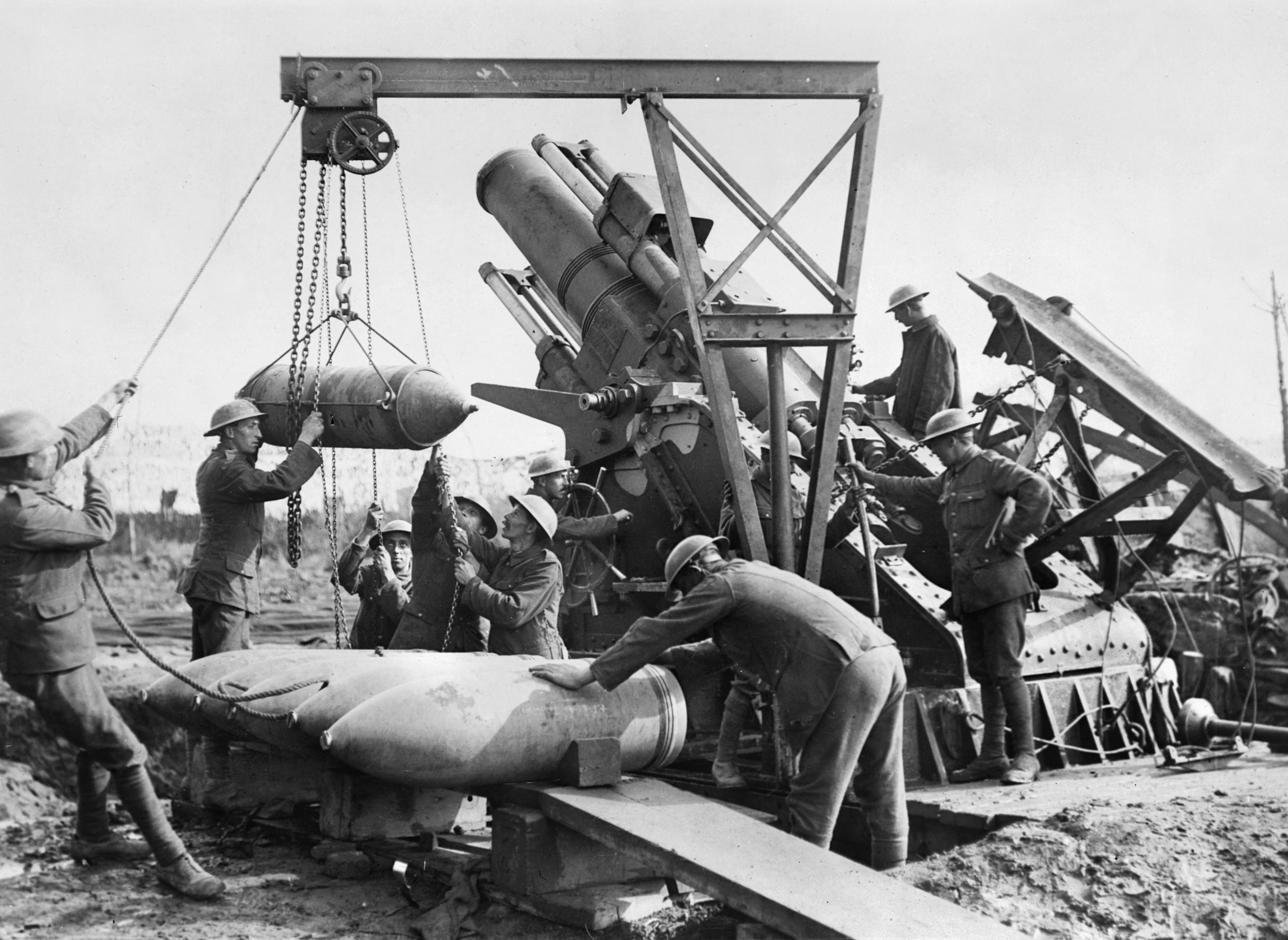
Loading a 15 in (380 mm) howitzer

Artillery dominated trench warfare, firing fragmentation, high-explosive, shrapnel, gas, and incendiary shells for infantry support, creeping barrages, and counter-battery fire. Despite lessons from the Russo-Japanese War, all combatants faced severe shell shortages early on. Artillery comprised flat-trajectory infantry support guns (used to cut wire and deliver fragmentation) and high-trajectory howitzers for plunging fire. Hydraulic recoil mechanisms greatly increased rates of fire by eliminating the need to re-aim after each shot. Initially, guns required visible registration on targets—alerting enemies to upcoming attacks—but by late 1917, pre-registration techniques behind the lines allowed for surprise strikes.

Mortars and howitzers saw massive expansion; British mortar shell usage grew from 545 rounds in 1914 to over 6.5 million in 1916. Mortars held key advantages over conventional artillery: they were highly portable, could be fired safely from within trenches, and dropped shells directly into enemy entrenchments. The main British design was the light, rapid-firing Stokes mortar. German forces deployed a wider range, from small grenade-throwers ('Granatenwerfer') and medium mine-throwers ('Minenwerfer') to the heavy mortar 'Ladungswerfer', which launched heavy "aerial torpedoes" over short ranges.

== Strategy and tactics ==
The fundamental strategy of trench warfare in World War I was to achieve a breakthrough, though offensives usually ended in attrition. Despite this, commanders still pursued a strategy of annihilation. General Douglas Haig constantly sought a breakthrough with cavalry, but his major offensives—the Somme (1916) and Flanders (1917)—degenerated into attrition. Conversely, the Germans intentionally pursued attrition at the Battle of Verdun to bleed the French Army, forcing the Allies to launch offensives elsewhere to relieve pressure. Attacks were often launched at night across pre-cut wire. In 1915, the Germans introduced infiltration tactics, bypassing strongpoints to strike deep, though advance limits were constrained by supply lines. Artillery served two main roles: preparing the ground before an assault and protecting advancing infantry with a barrage. Preparatory bombardments were often ineffective at destroying defences and gave early warning of attacks; the eight-day British bombardment at the Battle of the Somme failed to destroy German wire or deep dugouts. Initial "lifting barrages" often outpaced the infantry, leading to the adoption of the slower "creeping barrage" in late 1916. Its primary value lay in suppressing defenders rather than destruction. Holding captured ground required immediate fortification under threat of counter-attack, especially as advancing troops outran their own artillery support. The Germans prioritized immediate counter-attacks, prompting the British in 1917 to limit advances and hold artillery in reserve for defence. The Germans also pioneered "defence in depth", using a deep zone of mutually supporting redoubts to catch attackers in enfilade fire, and were willing to make strategic withdrawals. The British attempted a similar system before the 1918 Spring Offensive with little success, while France relied on reserves and artillery rather than deep entrenchment.

== Life in the trenches ==
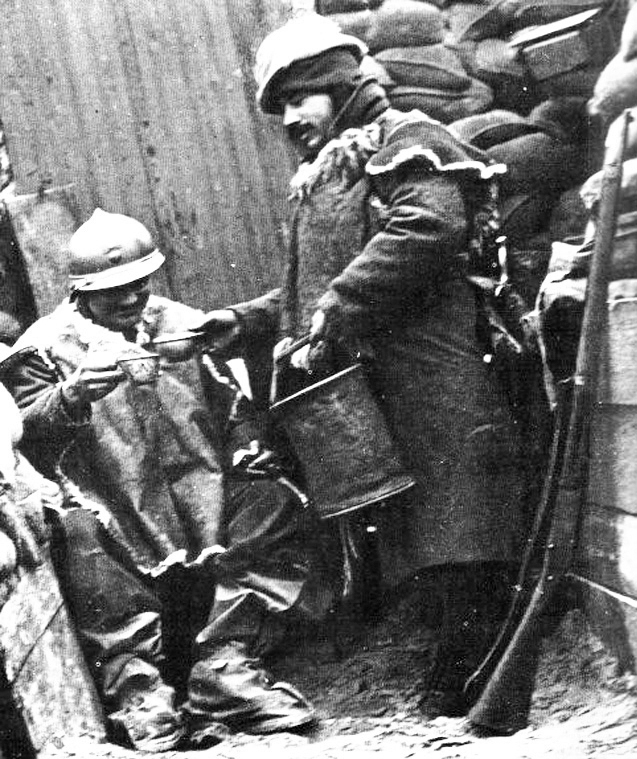
Distribution of pinard (ration wine) in a French trench in winter, considered important for morale

An individual unit's time in a front-line trench was usually brief, ranging from a single day up to two weeks before being relieved. The 31st Australian Battalion once spent 53 days in the line at Villers-Bretonneux, but such a duration was a rare exception. The 10th Battalion, CEF, averaged frontline tours of six days in 1915 and 1916. The units who manned the frontline trenches the longest were the Portuguese Expeditionary Corps from Portugal stationed in Northern France; unlike the other allies the Portuguese couldn't rotate units from the front lines due to lack of reinforcements sent from Portugal, nor could they replace the depleted units that lost manpower due to the war of attrition. With this rate of casualties and no reinforcements forthcoming, most of the men were denied leave and had to serve long periods in the trenches with some units spending up to six consecutive months in the front line with little to no leave during that time. Even when in the front line, the typical battalion would be called upon to engage in fighting only a handful of times a year; making an attack, defending against an attack or participating in a raid. The frequency of combat would increase for the units of the "elite" fighting divisions; on the Allied side, these were the British regular divisions, the Canadian Corps, the French XX Corps, and the Anzacs.

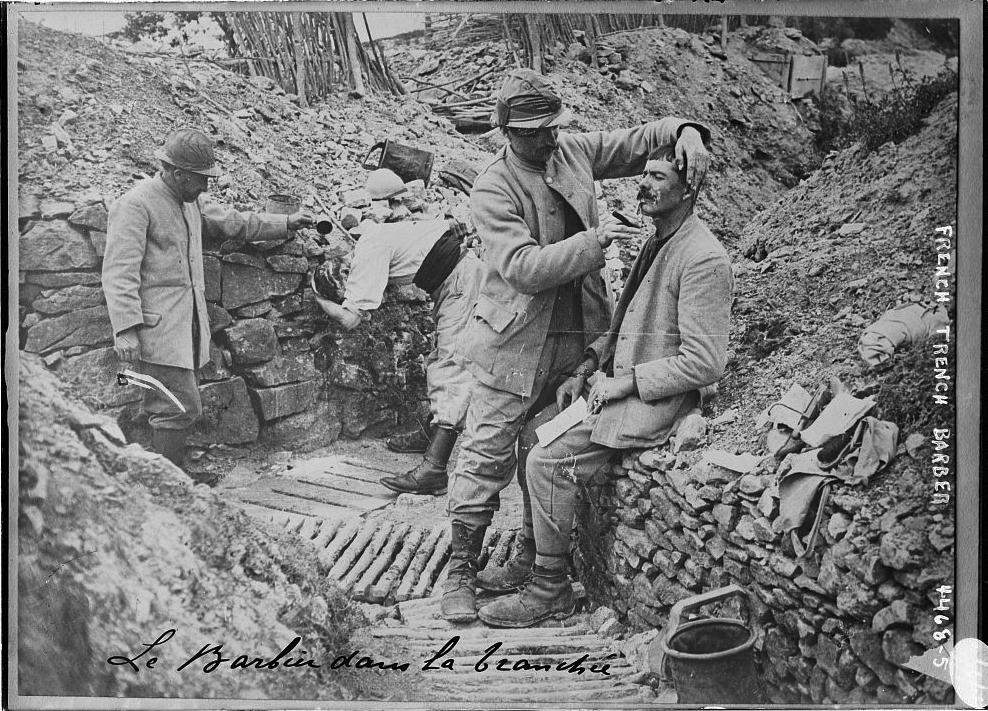
A barber in a French trench

Front-line duty was managed through a cascading rotation system down through corps, divisions, brigades, and battalions, with sub-units regularly alternating between front line, support positions, and reserve to prevent exhaustion. During the day, snipers and artillery observers in balloons made movement perilous, so the trenches were mostly quiet and soldiers focused on rest, maintenance, or reading trench magazines. Trenches were busiest at night under cover of darkness, which allowed movement of troops and supplies, maintenance of barbed wire, and reconnaissance.

Pioneered by the Princess Patricia's Canadian Light Infantry in February 1915, trench raids were carried out in order to capture prisoners and "booty"—letters and other documents to provide intelligence about the unit occupying the opposing trenches. As the war progressed, raiding became part of the general British policy, the intention being to maintain the fighting spirit of the troops and to deny no man's land to the Germans. As well, they were intended to compel the enemy to reinforce, which exposed their troops to artillery fire. Such dominance was achieved at a high cost when the enemy replied with their own artillery, and a post-war British analysis concluded the benefits were probably not worth the cost. By 1916, raids developed into carefully planned combined-arms operations involving close cooperation between infantry and artillery, using box barrages to isolate the target area despite the risk of alerting defenders.

== Dangers (injuries and diseases) ==
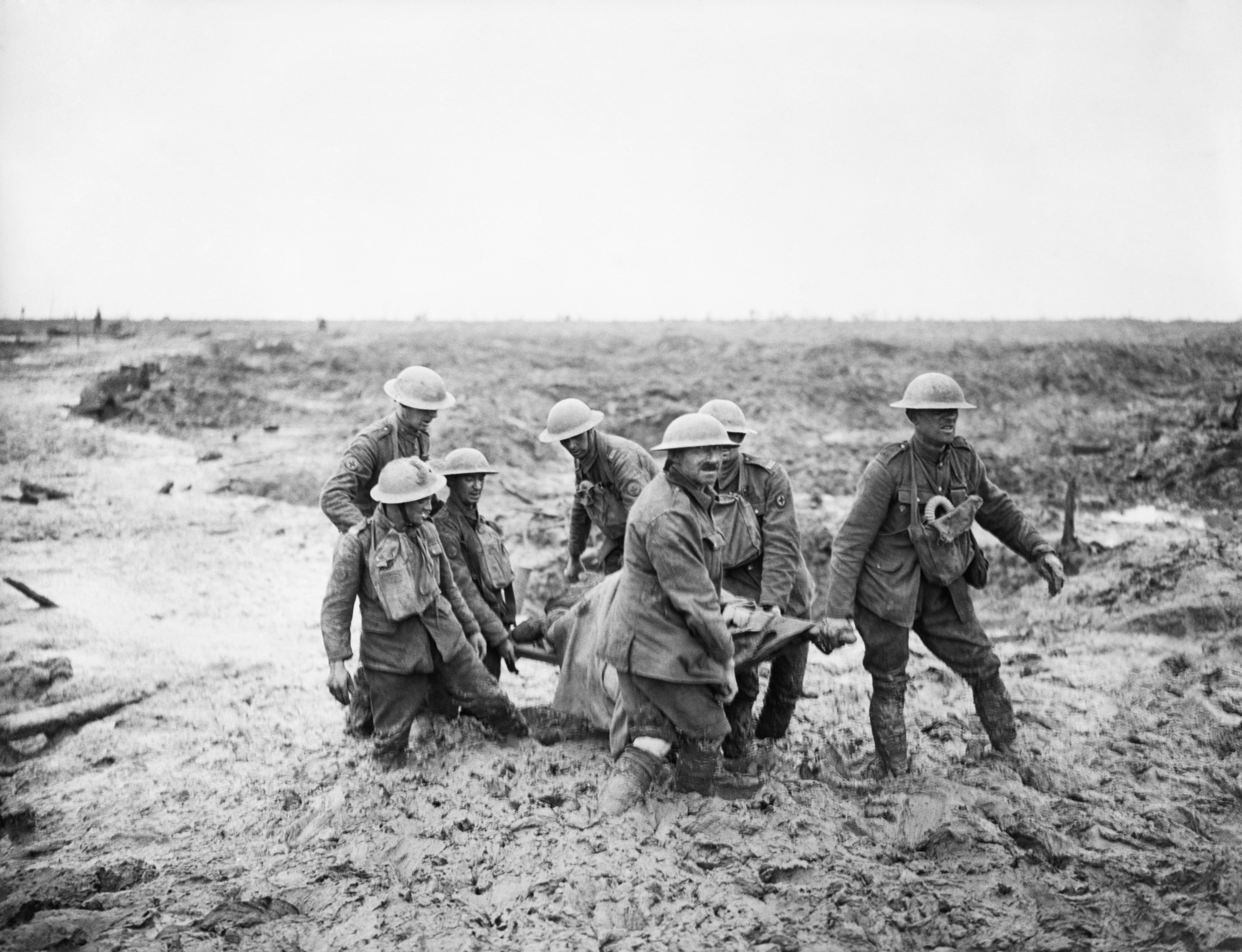
Stretcher bearers, Passchendaele, August 1917

Approximately 10–15 percent of all soldiers who fought in the First World War died as a result.

While the main cause of death in the trenches came from shelling and gunfire, diseases and infections were always present, and became prevalent for all sides as the war progressed. Medical procedures, while considerably more effective than at any previous time in history, were still not very helpful; antibiotics had not yet been discovered or invented. As a result, an infection caught in a trench often went untreated and could fester until the soldier died. Artillery fire was the main killer in the trenches, causing around 75 percent of casualties through direct hits and flying shell fragments. Gunfire accounted for another 34 percent of casualties. To counter a dramatic rise in lethal head wounds, armies introduced steel helmets starting in 1915: first the French Adrian helmet (replacing the kepi), followed by the British Brodie helmet, which was also adopted by US forces.

Trench fever, spread by lice feces, infected over one million Allied troops, causing severe pain, fevers, and long-term lethargy. Infection risks were high: gas gangrene thrived in soil-contaminated wounds, though improved medical care reduced incidence rates from 12% in 1914 to 1% by 1918. Poor sanitation also caused widespread intestinal parasite infections.Trench foot, caused by prolonged cold and wet conditions, resulted in thousands of casualties until routine hygiene inspections, sock changes, and waterproof boots were introduced. Millions of rats inhabited the trenches, feeding on rations and corpses. Despite hunting efforts by soldiers, they reproduced rapidly and contributed to the spread of disease.

Relentless artillery bombardment caused widespread psychological trauma, known as "shell shock". Unaware of the medical condition at the time, military authorities executed many afflicted soldiers for "cowardice"—including 306 British troops.

== Circumvention ==
=== Infiltration tactics ===
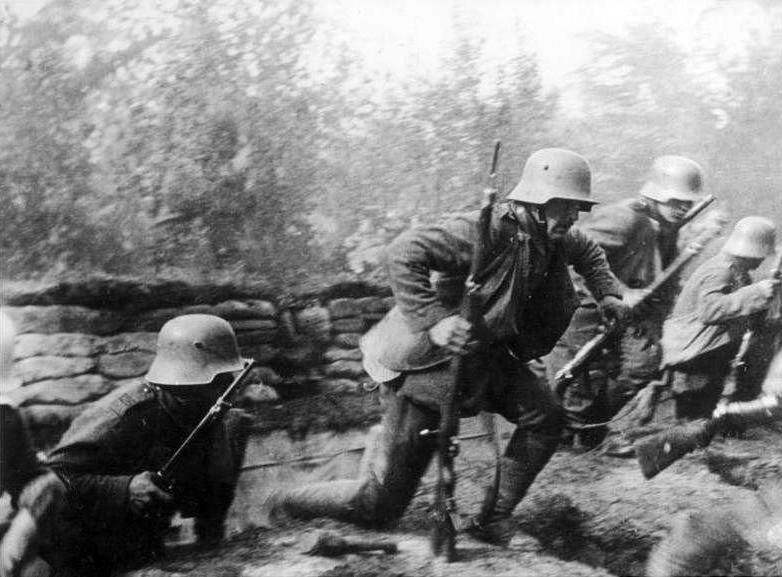
German Stoßtruppen (stormtroopers) rising from trenches to attack

As far back as the 18th century, Prussian military doctrine (Vernichtungsgedanke) stressed manoeuvre and force concentration to achieve a decisive battle. The German military searched for ways to apply this in the face of trench warfare. Experiments with new tactics by Willy Rohr, a Prussian captain serving in the Vosges mountains in 1915, got the attention of the Minister of War. These tactics carried Prussian military doctrine down to smallest units — specially trained troops manoeuvred and massed to assault positions they chose on their own. During the next two years the German army tried to establish special stormtrooper detachments in all its units by sending selected men to Rohr and have those men then train their comrades in their original units.

Similar tactics were developed independently in other countries, such as French Army captain André Laffargue in 1915 and Russian general Aleksei Brusilov in 1916, but these failed to be adopted as any military doctrine.

The German stormtrooper methods involved men rushing forward in small groups using whatever cover was available and laying down covering fire for other groups in the same unit as they moved forward. The new tactics, intended to achieve surprise by disrupting entrenched enemy positions, aimed to bypass strongpoints and to attack the weakest parts of an enemy's line. Additionally, they acknowledged the futility of managing a grand detailed plan of operations from afar, opting instead for junior officers on the spot to exercise initiative.

The Germans employed and improved infiltration tactics in a series of smaller to larger battles, each increasingly successful, leading up to the Battle of Caporetto against the Italians in 1917, and finally the massive German spring offensive in 1918 against the British and French. German infiltration tactics are sometimes called "Hutier tactics" by others, after Oskar von Hutier, the general leading the German 18th Army, which had the farthest advance in that offensive. After a stunningly rapid advance, the offensive failed to achieve a breakthrough; German forces stalled after outrunning their supply, artillery, and reinforcements, which could not catch up over the shell-torn ground left ruined by Allied attacks in the Battle of the Somme in 1916. The exhausted German forces were soon pushed back in the Allied Hundred Days Offensive, and the Germans were unable to organise another major offensive before the war's end. In post-war years, other nations did not fully appreciate these German tactical innovations amidst the overall German defeat.

=== Mining ===
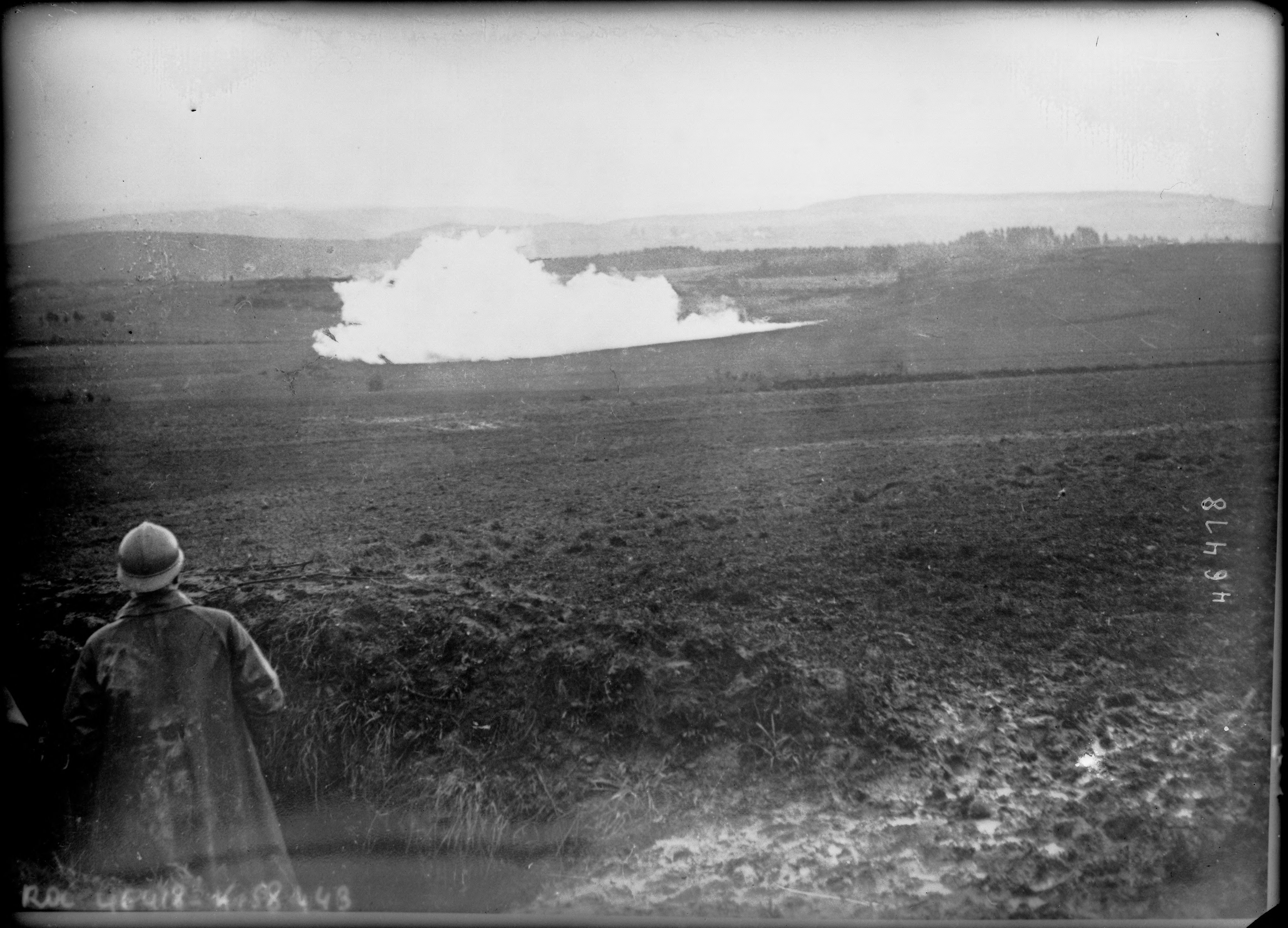
Explosion of a mine seen from a French position. 1916

Mines—explosive-packed tunnels beneath enemy trenches—were widely used to disrupt frontline defences, particularly in the chalk of the Somme and the clay of Flanders. Specialist tunneling units of civilian miners dug under no-man's land to detonate charges. The resulting craters destroyed trenches and provided raised, ready-made firing positions that both sides fought to occupy.

Tunnellers used counter-mines and explosive camouflets to destroy enemy workings, occasionally engaging in underground combat or raiding enemy shafts. Tunnels were also used for concealed troop movements; on one occasion, an entire British division moved undetected through interconnected workings and sewers. On July 1, 1916—the first day of the Battle of the Somme—the British detonated 19 mines, including the Y Sap and Lochnagar Mine near La Boiselle, which contained 24 tons of explosives each and threw earth 4,000 feet (1,200 m) into the air.

=== Gas ===
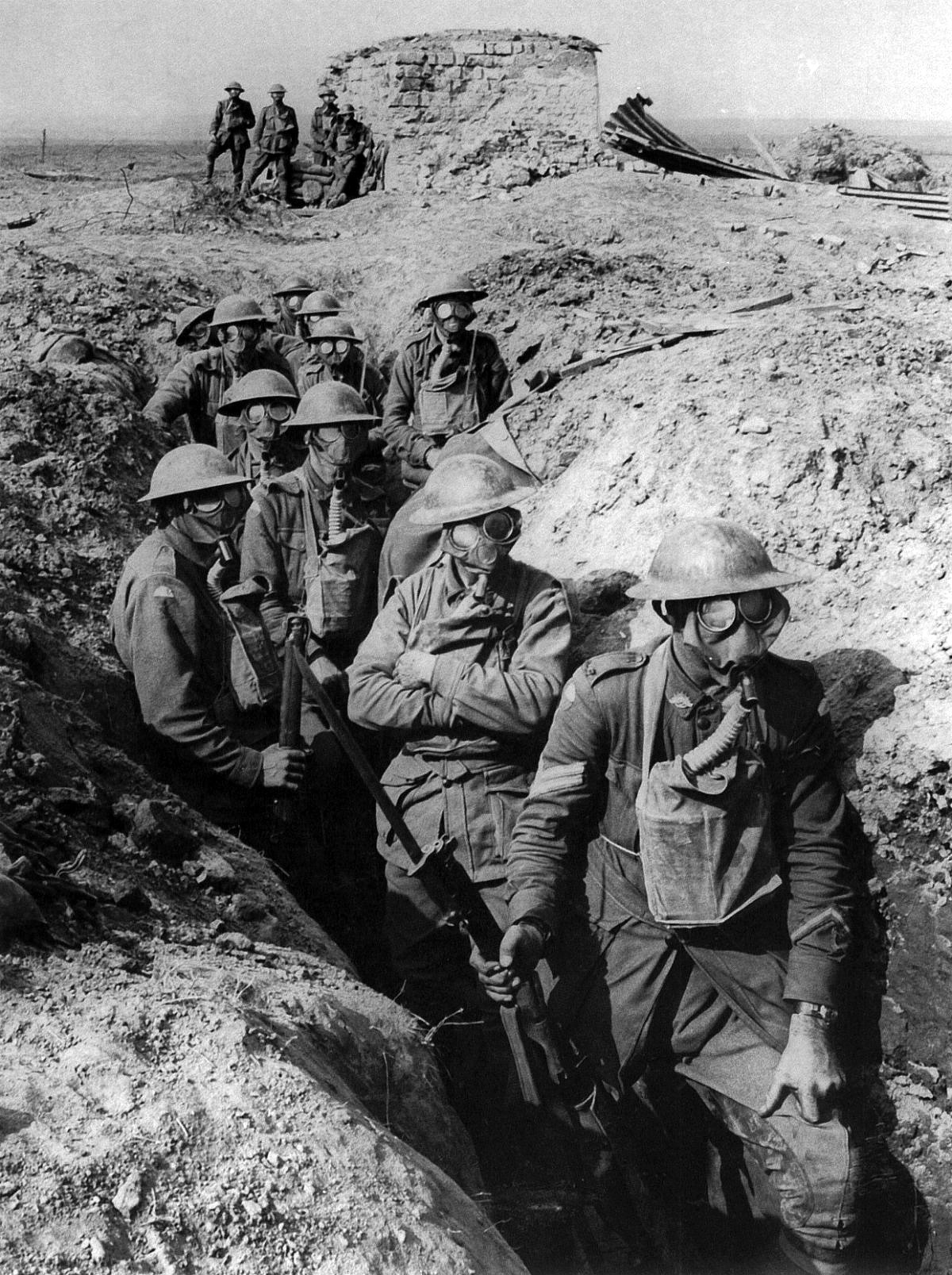
Australian infantry wearing WWI gas masks, Ypres, September 1917

World War I saw large-scale chemical warfare. Early deployment via gas cylinders was unreliable and hazardous if the wind shifted or cylinders ruptured. Delivery was later improved using artillery and mortar shells, though lingering agents remained a risk for advancing forces. Initial improvised defense—such as urine-soaked handkerchiefs—was quickly replaced by issued gas masks. Continuous improvements in protective equipment significantly reduced the effectiveness of attacks by the war's end.

Several gas agents were deployed throughout the conflict. France first used tear gas in August 1914 to temporarily incapacitate troops. In April 1915, Germany introduced chlorine at the Second Battle of Ypres; it caused severe lung damage but was easily detectable. Phosgene, introduced in December 1915, was 18 times more powerful than chlorine, difficult to detect, and became the most lethal gas of the war. Finally, mustard gas was introduced by Germany in July 1917 and proved to be the most effective chemical weapon. Although it had a low mortality rate of 2%, it lingered on the battlefield, causing severe skin burns, blindness, and long-term casualties that heavily burdened medical resources.

=== Tanks ===
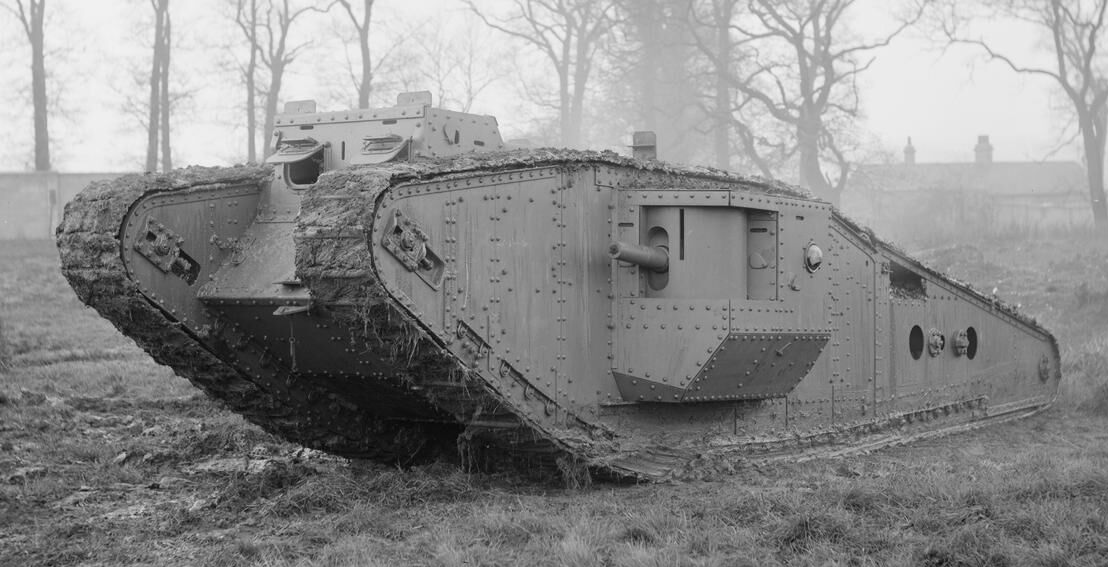
This British Mark IV tank displays a "tadpole tail" extension for crossing especially wide trenches, an experiment that was not successful

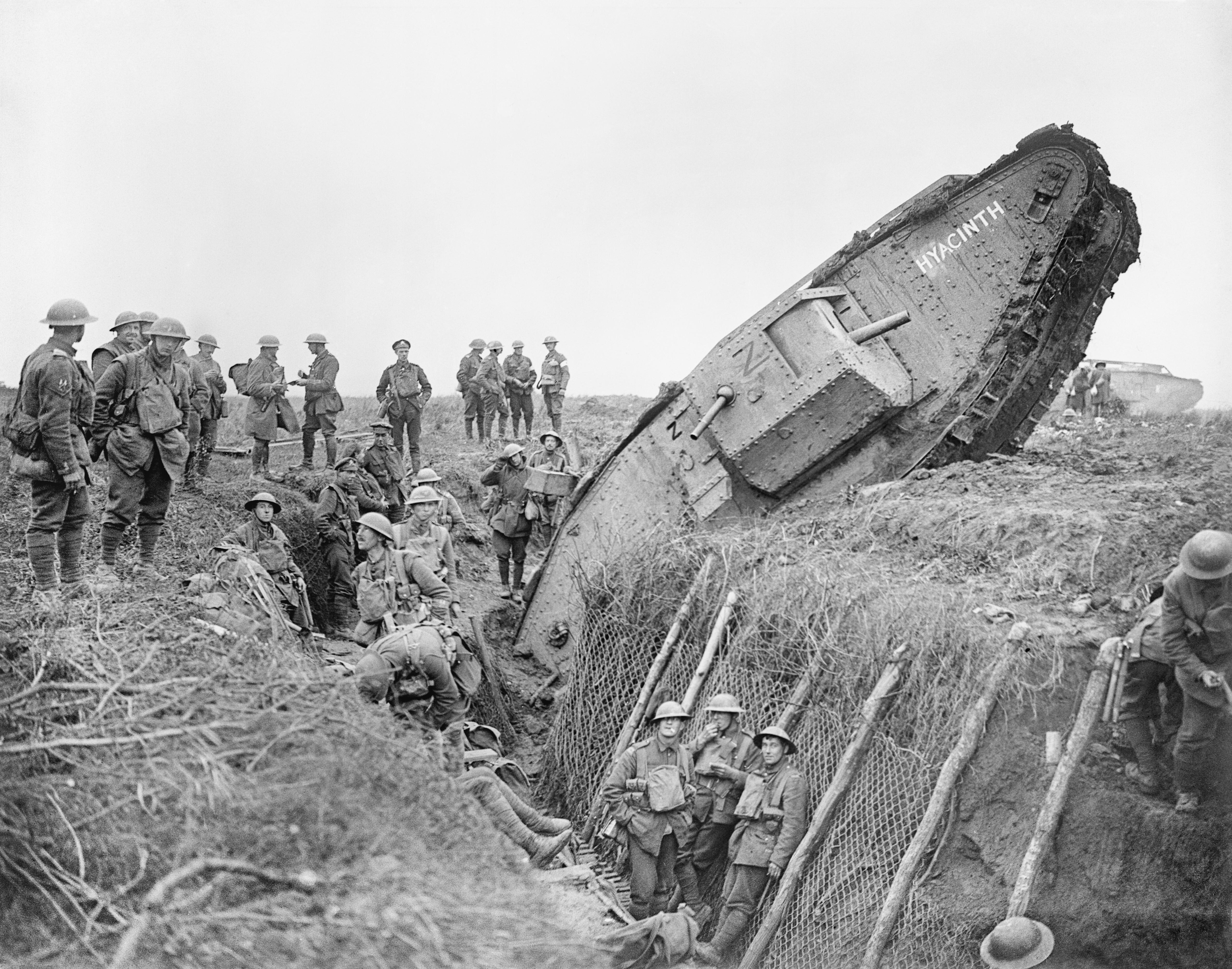
Failure of a tank to cross an anti-tank trench

Tanks were developed by the British and French to overcome trench warfare by combining heavy firepower, armour, and tracked mobility. British tanks, built with a rhomboid shape to cross obstacles and barbed wire, debuted at the Battle of the Somme in 1916. Early operations were hampered by mechanical unreliability, shell-torn terrain, and undeveloped doctrine. At the First Battle of Cambrai in 1917, larger formations demonstrated their battlefield potential, though German forces countered with improvised anti-tank tactics and direct field artillery fire.

By 1918, improved capabilities, refined tactics, and larger numbers of Allied armor helped break the stalemate. During the Hundred Days Offensive, tanks supported infantry and close air support to push back German forces. Although their overall World War I impact was limited by late deployment and technological teething issues, tanks became central to future military strategy, as reflected in Britain's proposed Plan 1919, and marked the decline of static trench warfare.

During the interwar period, major powers developed divergent tank designs and doctrines. Despite restrictions imposed by the Treaty of Versailles, Germany combined domestic and captured Czech armor with novel operational tactics to form the foundation of blitzkrieg in World War II.

== Later use ==
Side view diagram of a gun in a retractable turret, in block 3 in Ouvrage Schoenenbourg of the Maginot Line

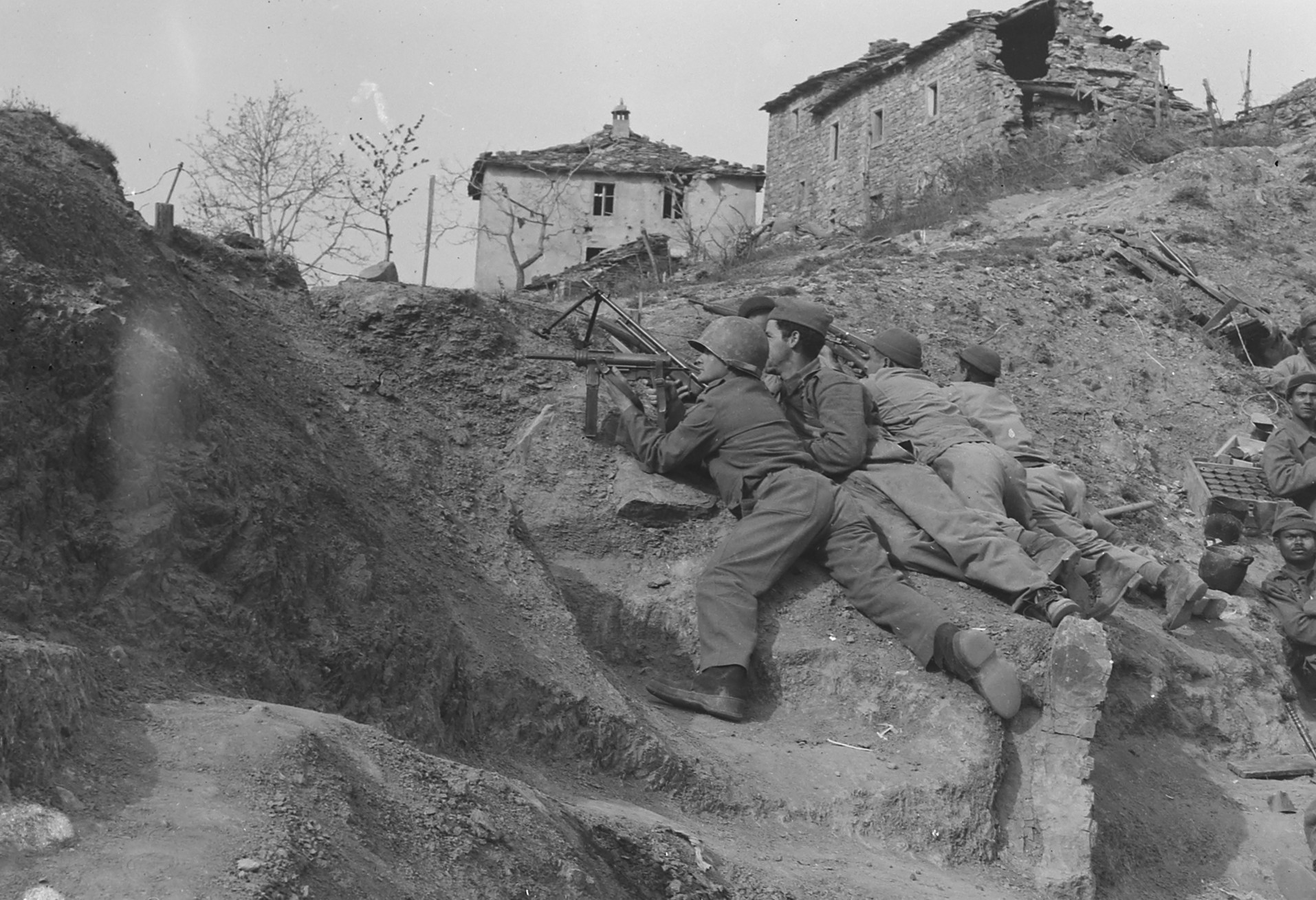
Soldiers of the Brazilian Expeditionary Force in a trench during the Battle of Montese, 1945

=== Spanish Civil War ===
Trenches were often utilized by both sides, particularly the Nationalists whose military ground doctrine emphasized static defence. The Republicans also employed the use of trenches, but also human wave attacks most notably during their defence of Casa de Campo in the Siege of Madrid.

=== World War II ===
In the decade leading up to World War II, the French built the Maginot Line, based on their experience with trench warfare in World War I. The Maginot Line was an extensive state-of-the-art defensive system far superior to any previous trench system: a chain of massive constructions of concrete, iron, and steel fortresses, bunkers, retractable turrets, outposts, obstacles, and sunken artillery emplacements, linked by tunnel networks. It covered the length of the Franco-German border and was 20–25 kilometres (12–16 mi) wide. It was supported by numerous underground barracks, shelters, ammunition dumps and depots, with its own telephone network and narrow gauge railways with armoured locomotives, backed up with heavy rail artillery. French military experts placed high value on the line, saying it would curb German aggression, as any invasion force would be halted long enough for French forces to mobilize and counterattack. Furthermore, French military planning during the inter-war period believed that the line would force the Germans to invade Belgium. This would allow any future conflict to take place off of French soil. By bypassing the Maginot Line and fighting the Belgian Army, it would allow the French military to move its best formations to counter. In the Battle of France, Germany invaded Belgium and the best Anglo-French forces moved to meet them as planned. However, the Germans had only recently changed their plans from what the French had anticipated would happen. Instead of an attack through central Belgium, the main German attack was delivered through the Ardennes forest. Inter-war French planning believed it would take the Germans 9 days to move forces through this area, and that it could be held by small forces. The German forces outpaced expectations and soon crossed into France between the main French forces and the Maginot Line. They then advanced towards the English Channel, and surrounded the Anglo-French armies. Small secondary German attacks concentrated at a few points in the Line had mixed success. The bulk of the Maginot Line was untouched, its garrisons withdrawn, and flanked. Due to the lack of combat, much of it has survived.

The return of mobile warfare in World War II reduced the emphasis of trench warfare, as defenders commonly lacked the time to build up such battlefield defences before they were forced to redeploy, due to the more rapidly-changing strategic situation. But trench systems were still effective, wherever mobility was limited, the front lines were static, or around known critical objectives that could not be bypassed. More quickly improvised defensive fighting positions, using "scrapes" or "foxholes", that can be supplemented by sand bags, local materials, debris, or rubble, remain in common use. These are typically improved and expanded by the defenders, eventually becoming full trench systems, if given enough time and resources.

In the Winter War, the Mannerheim Line was a system of flexible field fortification for the defending Finns. While having very few bunkers and artillery compared to heavy defence lines like the Maginot Line, it allowed defensive platoons to regroup between field fortifications (wood-earth firing posts, dugouts and pillboxes) instead of locking them into bunkers, while forcing the invaders to attack trenches as in World War I without armor and direct fire support. It caused heavy losses to the Soviets and repelled them for two months.

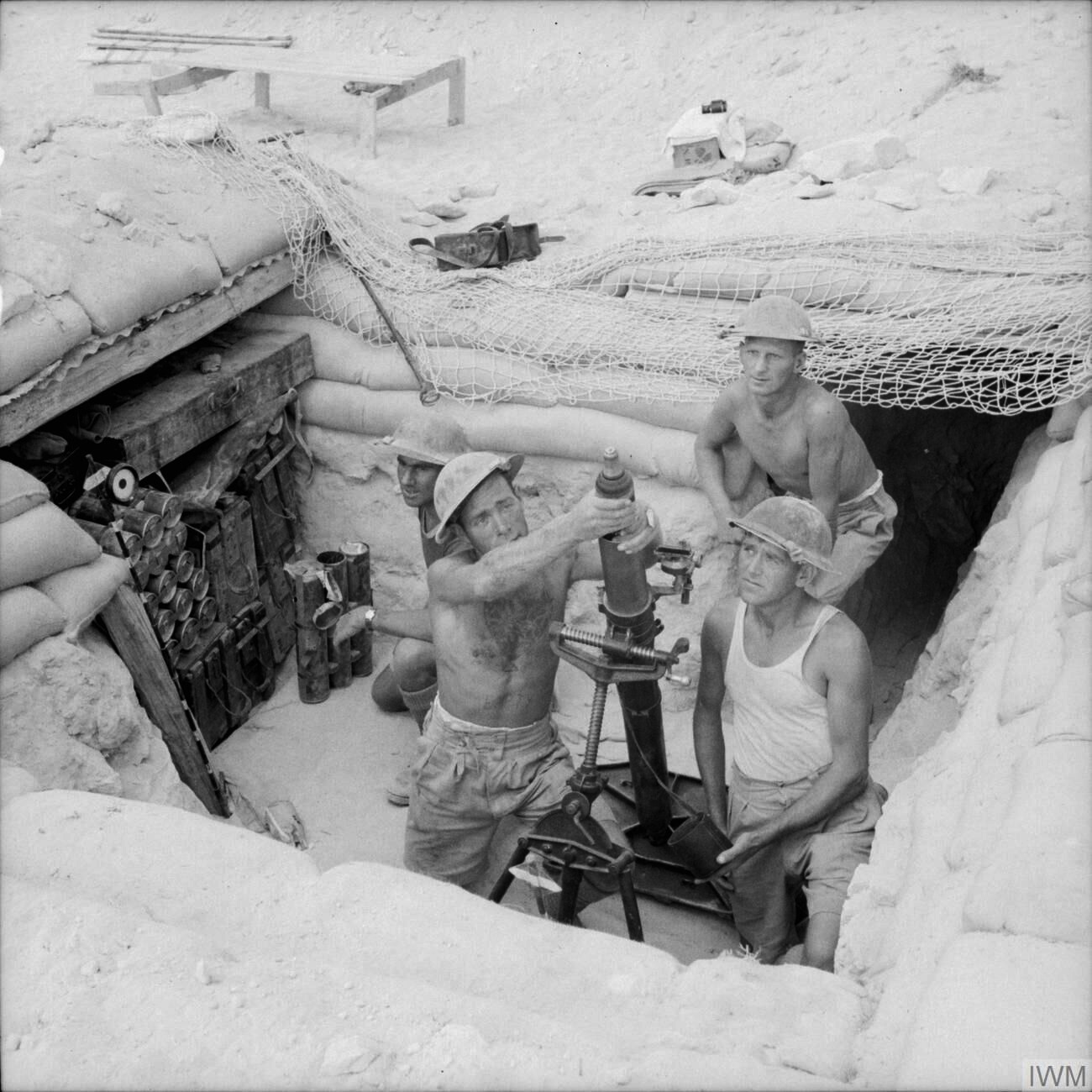
A British trench mortar post in North Africa, 1940

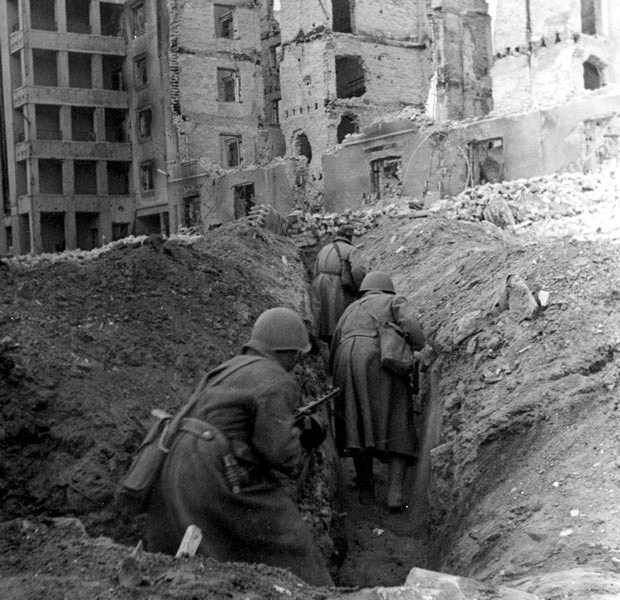
Soviet soldiers running through the ruins of Stalingrad, 1942

At the Battle of Sevastopol, Red Army forces successfully held trench systems on the narrow peninsula for several months against intense German bombardment. The Western Allies in 1944 broke through the incomplete Atlantic Wall with relative ease through a combination of amphibious landings, naval gunfire, air attack, and airborne landings. Combined arms tactics where infantry, artillery, armour and aircraft cooperate closely greatly reduced the importance of trench warfare. It was, however, still a valuable method for reinforcing natural boundaries and creating a line of defence. For example, at the Battle of Stalingrad, soldiers on both sides dug trenches within the ruins. In the Battle of Hürtgen Forest, both American and German soldiers also dug trenches and foxholes in the rugged woods of the forest which led to continuous stalemates and failed offensives that lasted for months, which was reminiscent of the trench warfare of World War I. The Battle of the Scheldt, due to the geography of the battle field greatly involved the use of trench warfare. In addition, before the start of the Battle of Kursk, the Soviets constructed a system of defence more elaborate than any they built during World War I. These defences succeeded in stopping the German armoured pincers from meeting and enveloping the salient.

The Italian Campaign fought from 1943 until the end of the war in Europe largely consisted of the Allies storming strongly fortified German lines which stretched from one coast, over the mountains to the other coast. When the Allies broke through one line, the Germans would retreat up the peninsula to yet another freshly prepared fortified line.

At the start of the Battle of Berlin, the last major assault on Germany, the Soviets attacked over the river Oder against German troops dug in on the Seelow Heights, about 50 km (31 mi) east of Berlin. Entrenchment allowed the Germans, who were massively outnumbered, to survive a bombardment from the largest concentration of artillery in history; as the Red Army attempted to cross the marshy riverside terrain they lost tens of thousands of casualties to the entrenched Germans before breaking through.

During the Pacific War, the Japanese used a labyrinth of underground fixed positions to slow down the Allied advances on many Pacific Islands. The Japanese built fixed fortifications on Iwo Jima, Okinawa, and Peleliu using a system of tunnels to interconnect their fortified positions. Many of these were former mine shafts that were turned into defence positions. Engineers added sliding armored steel doors with multiple openings to serve both artillery and machine guns. Cave entrances were built slanted as a defence against grenade and flamethrower attacks. The caves and bunkers were connected to a vast system throughout the defences, which allowed the Japanese to evacuate or reoccupy positions as needed, and to take advantage of shrinking interior lines. This network of bunkers, tunnels, and pillboxes favoured the defence. For instance, the Japanese on Iwo Jima had several levels of honeycombed fortifications. The Nanpo Bunker (Southern Area Islands Naval Air HQ), which was located east of Airfield Number 2, had enough food, water and ammo for the Japanese to hold out for three months. The bunker was 90 feet deep and had tunnels running in various directions. Approximately 500 55-gallon drums filled with water, kerosene, and fuel oil for generators were located inside the complex. Gasoline powered generators allowed for radios and lighting to be operated underground. The Japanese caused the American advance to slow down and caused massive casualties with these underground fixed positions. The Americans eventually used flamethrowers and systematic hand-to-hand fighting to oust the defenders. The American ground forces were supported by extensive naval artillery, and had complete air supremacy provided by U.S. Navy and Marine Corps aviators throughout the entire battle.

=== Post-1945 to modern day ===
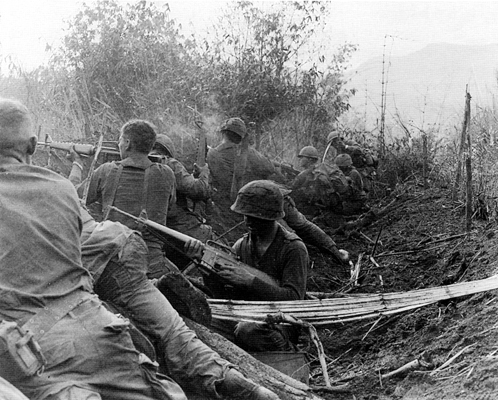
Men of the 1st Brigade, 101st Airborne Division, fire from old Viet Cong trenches during the Vietnam War.

Trench warfare has been infrequent in recent wars. When two large armoured armies meet, the result has generally been mobile warfare of the type which developed in World War II. However, trench warfare re-emerged in the latter stages of the Chinese Civil War (Huaihai Campaign) and the Korean War (from July 1951 to its end).

During the Cold War, NATO forces routinely trained to fight through extensive works called "Soviet-style trench systems", named after the Warsaw Pact's complex systems of field fortifications, an extension of Soviet field entrenching practices for which they were famous in their Great Patriotic War (the Eastern Front of World War II).

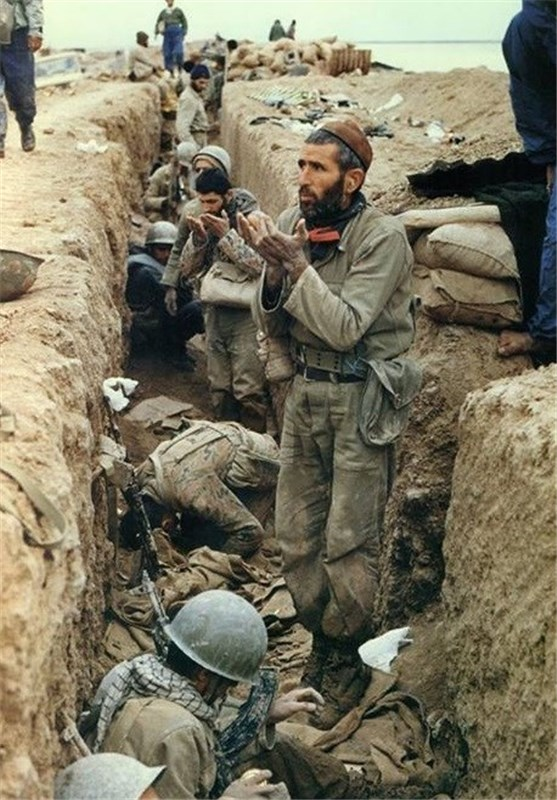
Iranian soldiers praying inside a trench during the Iran–Iraq War

In the Iran–Iraq War, both armies lacked training in combined arms operations. Both countries often prepared entrenched defensive positions and tunnels to protect and supply the cities and bases throughout the regions. Military mobility was drastically reduced; hidden anti-tank mines, and unstable footing made it easy to slide into or get buried in a camouflaged anti-tank trench. Tactics used included trench warfare, machine gun posts, bayonet charges, booby traps, use of barbed wire across trenches and on no-man's land, Iranian human wave attacks, and Iraq's extensive use of chemical weapons such as mustard gas against Iranian troops.

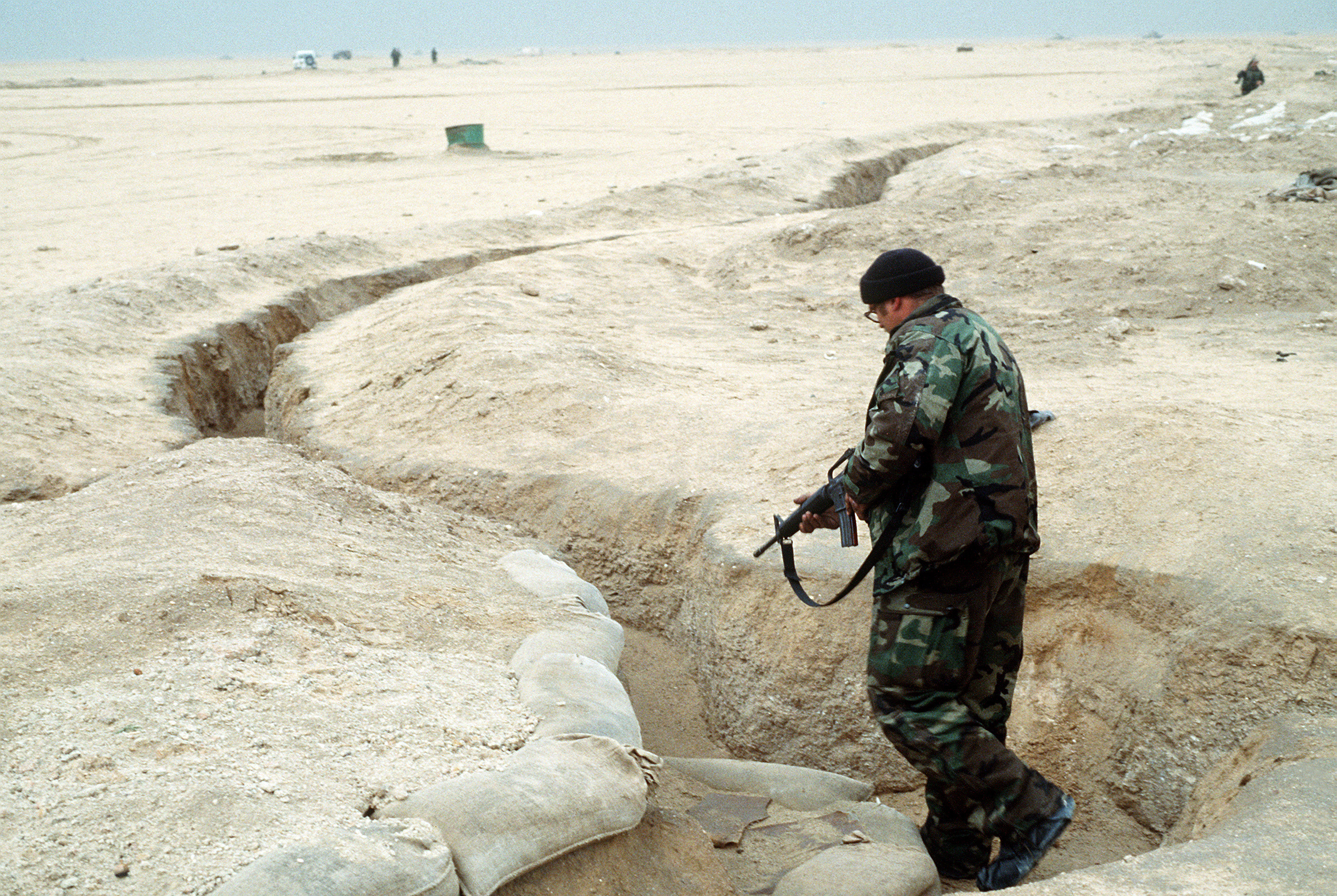
A Coalition soldier inspects an abandoned Iraqi trench for any remaining enemy soldiers during Operation Desert Storm

Iraq again attempted to use trenches during the 1991 Gulf War. After the Invasion of Kuwait, Saddam Hussein with the objective of forcing the coalition to engage in costly World War I-era trench warfare, ordered the construction of a massive fortification line in the Saudi-Kuwait border, consisting of regular trench lines, "flame trenches" (ditches filled with oil to be ignited in case of attack), sand berms, trench works, anti-tank ditches, barbed wire and minefields, which became known as the Saddam Line. However, at the start of the Liberation of Kuwait, the US forces charged the Iraqi lines with M1 Abrams tanks modified with minesweeping ploughs and M728 Combat Engineer Vehicles which buried the trench lines, and in many cases, buried Iraqi troops alive. In less than three hours after the initial assault, US and coalition forces had already broken through and bypassed the Saddam line and the rest of war was composed by highly mobile manoeuvre warfare focusing on overwhelming power against the Iraqis.

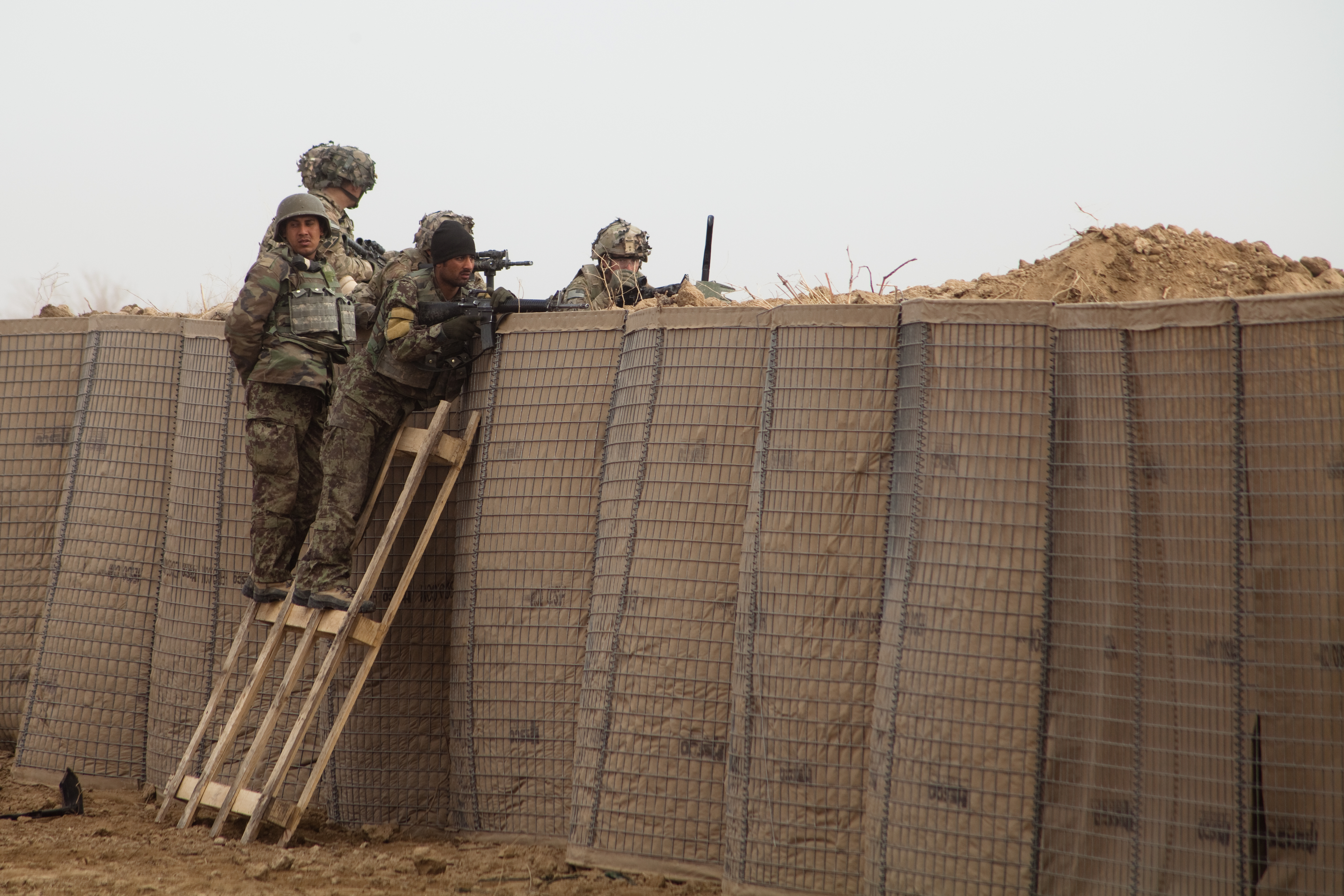
Afghan and U.S. soldiers provide security while standing behind a blast wall made from HESCO bastions Afghanistan, 2012

There was an extensive trench system inside and outside the city during the 1992–1996 Siege of Sarajevo. It was used mainly for transportation to the front-line or to avoid snipers inside the city. Any pre-existing structures were used as trenches; the best known example is the bobsleigh course at Trebević, which was used by both Serb and Bosniaks forces during the siege.

In the Eritrean-Ethiopian War of 1998–2000, the widespread use of trenches raised comparisons to the trench warfare of World War I. According to some reports, trench warfare led to the loss of "thousands of young lives in human-wave assaults on Eritrea's positions". The Eritrean defences were eventually overtaken by a surprise Ethiopian pincer movement on the Western front, attacking a mined, but lightly defended mountain (without trenches), resulting in the capture of Barentu and an Eritrean retreat. The element of surprise in the attack involved the use of donkeys as pack animals as well as being a solely infantry affair, with tanks coming in afterwards only to secure the area.

The front line in Korea and the Line of Control in Kashmir between Pakistan and India are two examples of demarcation lines which could become hot at any time. They consist of kilometres of trenches linking fortified strongpoints and in Korea surrounded by millions of land mines. The Indian Army has fortified the LOC with 900 fixed tank turrets. The borders between Armenia and Azerbaijan amid the ongoing Nagorno-Karabakh conflict are also heavily fortified with trenches and barbed wire, with the two sides regularly trading fire.

==== Russo-Ukrainian War ====
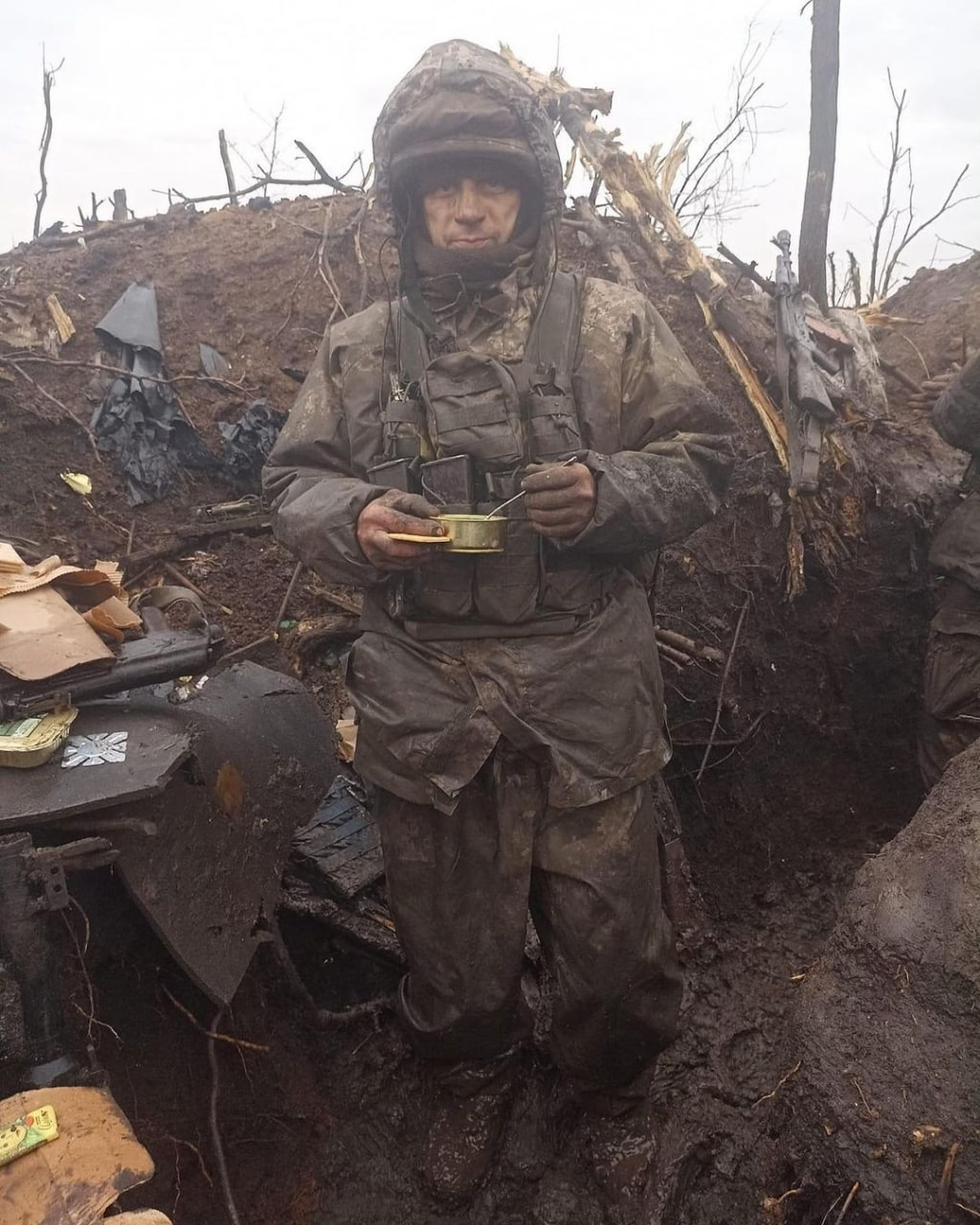
Ukrainian soldier in a trench during the Battle of Bakhmut

Trench warfare became a common characteristic of the Russo-Ukrainian War, first appearing at the War in Donbas, as both Ukrainian and Russian proxy forces resorted to digging small trench networks and engaging in warfare akin to the trench fights of World War I in order to safeguard and assert their territories. This involved soldiers spending extended periods within trenches, employing cement mixers and excavators to construct tunnel networks and deep bunkers for added protection. After the Minsk peace agreements in 2015, the front lines did not move significantly until the 2022 Russian invasion, and both sides expanded and reinforced in preparation for a future large-scale conflict, and the two sides mostly fired mortars and sniper shots at each other.

The initial Russian offensive in 2022 was first composed of combined arms maneuvre warfare by Russian forces, specially at the Northern and Southern fronts, while fighting resumed at the heavily fortified trenchlines of the JFO zone. However, Russia failed to maintain the initial push and pulled back from the Northern and Northeastern directions, preferring to focus on capturing the Donbas and securing its gains in Southern Ukraine. The conflicted settled into trench warfare, seeing the construction of trench lines and similar defensive structures by both sides, resulting in a static war of attrition with slow advances and artillery duels, especially in Donetsk Oblast. Experts point to the return to trench warfare as a result of the high lethality of modern sensors, drones, and artillery, which reduced the ability of either side to concentrate armour or infantry for a large-scale assault without being rapidly detected and destroyed by highly-precise artillery and/or suicide drones. In addition, neither side was able to achieve air superiority due to the prevalence of anti-aircraft defenses, which prevents them from safely flying low and providing prolonged close air support.

Pictures of muddy trenches, stumps of charred trees in a shell-pocked landscape made the Battle of Bakhmut emblematic for its trench warfare conditions, with neither side making any significant breakthroughs amid hundreds of casualties reported daily. Modern technology has adapted to the trench warfare, and use of drones and mobile networks is common. The battlefield has been described as "World War I with 21st-century Intelligence, Surveillance, and Reconnaissance".

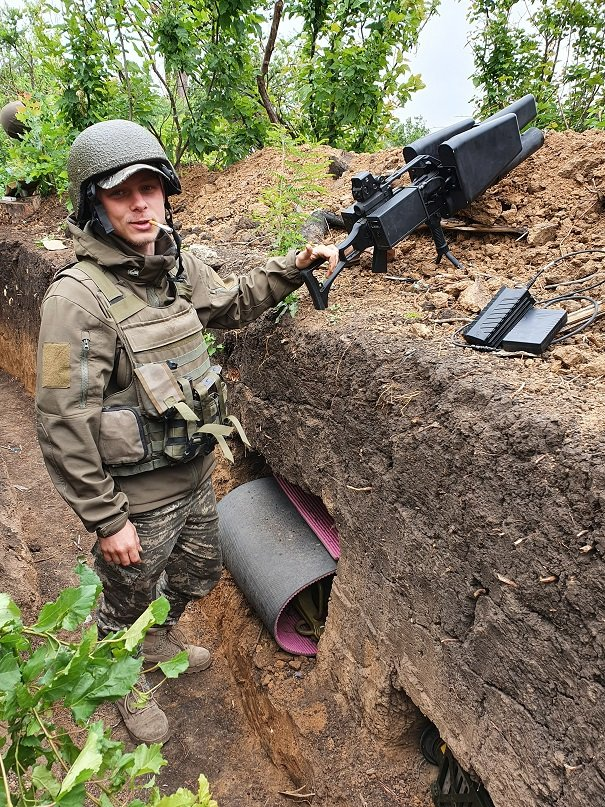
Ukrainian soldier inside a trench with a EDM4S portable anti-drone jammer

By 2023 and 2024, the increase and proliferation drone warfare further reshaped the nature of trench fighting. Constant aerial surveillance made traditional frontlines increasingly porous, as small, inexpensive reconnaissance and attack drones were used to locate, track, and strike soldiers, vehicles and artillery even deep within trench systems. Constant overhead drone presence forced units to adopt new survival tactics such as rapid movement between positions, enhanced camouflage, dispersed formations, and underground sheltering. Analysis by Ukrainian journalist Veronika Melkozorova found that drones have effectively "erased the frontline," creating a battlespace where exposure outside of cover (buildings, dugouts, etc.) for even a few seconds can prove lethal, being spotted, and later targeted by drones, and where trench systems function as much to evade aerial drone detection as to protect against artillery and small arms fire.

== Cultural impact ==
Trench warfare has become a powerful symbol of the futility of war. Its image is of young men going "over the top" (over the parapet of the trench, to attack the enemy trench line) into a maelstrom of fire leading to near-certain death, typified by the first day of the Battle of the Somme (on which the British Army suffered nearly 60,000 casualties) or the grinding slaughter in the mud of Passchendaele. To the French, the equivalent is the attrition of the Battle of Verdun in which the French Army suffered over 380,000 documented combat deaths.

Trench warfare is associated with mass slaughter in appalling conditions. Many critics have argued that brave men went to their deaths because of incompetent and narrow-minded commanders who failed to adapt to the new conditions of trench warfare: class-ridden and backward-looking generals put their faith in the attack, believing superior morale and dash would overcome the weapons and moral inferiority of the defender. British public opinion often repeated the theme that their soldiers were "lions led by donkeys".

World War I generals are often portrayed as callously persisting in repeated hopeless attacks against trenches. There were failures such as Passchendaele, and Sir Douglas Haig has often been criticised for allowing his battles to continue long after they had lost any purpose other than attrition. Haig's defenders counter that the attrition was necessary in order to cause attrition in the German army.

The problems of trench warfare were recognised, and attempts were made to address them. These included improvements in artillery, infantry tactics, and the development of tanks. By 1918, taking advantage of failing German morale, Allied attacks were generally more successful and suffered fewer casualties; in the Hundred Days Offensive, there was a return to mobile warfare. However, if both sides have comparable equipment, capability, and conditions, the trench is still seen in modern wars.

== See also ==
- Harry Patch
- Mercy dog
- Sangar (fortification)
- Underground living

== Bibliography ==
- Archer, Christon I.; Ferris, John R.; Herwig, Holger H.; Travers, Timothy H. E. (2003). World History of Warfare. London: Cassell. ISBN 0-304-36352-9.
- Sodergren, Steven (2017). The Army of the Potomac in the Overland & Petersburg Campaigns: Union Soldiers and Trench Warfare, 1864-1865. Baton Rouge: Louisiana University Press. ISBN 978-0-80716-556-0.
- Griffith, Paddy (2001). Battle tactics of the Civil War. New Haven: Yale University Press. ISBN 0-30008-461-7.
- Stein, Mark L. (2007). Guarding the Frontier: Ottoman Border Forts and Garrisons in Europe. London: Tauris. ISBN 1-84511-301-2.
- Ostwald, Jamel (2007). Vauban Under Siege - Engineering Efficiency and Martial Vigor in The War of The Spanish Succession. History of Warfare. Vol. 41. Leiden: Brill. ISBN 978-90-04-15489-6.
- Hooker, J.T. (1980). The Ancient Spartans. London: J.M. Dent. ISBN 0-46004-352-8.
- Kern, Paul Bentley (1999). Ancient Siege Warfare. London: Souvenir Press. ISBN 0-253-335-469.
- Thucydides. "The History of the Peloponnesian War". Project Gutenberg.
- Flavius, Josephus (1960). De bello Judaico. New York: Harper.
- Warry, John Gibson (1993). Warfare in the Classical World: an Illustrated Encyclopedia of Weapons, Warriors and Warfare in the Ancient Civilisations of Greece and Rome. New York: Barnes & Noble. ISBN 1-566-194-636.
- Christon I. Archer, John R. Ferris, Holger H. Herwig, Thimothy H. E. Travers, ed. (2003). World History of Warfare. London: Cassell. ISBN 0-30436-352-9.
- Ashworth, Tony (2000). Trench Warfare 1914–1918. London: Macmillan Press. ISBN 0-330-48068-5.
- Bidwell, Shelford; Graham, Dominick (2004). Fire-power – The British Army Weapons and Theory of War 1904–1945. Pen & Sword Books. ISBN 0-04942-190-5.
- Chisholm, Hugh, ed. (1911). "Weissenburg" . Encyclopædia Britannica. Vol. 28 (11th ed.). Cambridge University Press. pp. 499–500.
- Edmonds, J. E. (1991) [1948]. Military Operations France and Belgium 1917: 7 June – 10 November. Messines and Third Ypres (Passchendaele). History of the Great War Based on Official Documents by Direction of the Historical Section of the Committee of Imperial Defence. Vol. II (Imperial War Museum and Battery Press ed.). London: HMSO. ISBN 978-0-89839-166-4.
- Ellis, John (1977). Eye-Deep in Hell – Life in the Trenches 1914–1918. Fontana.
- Foley, R. T. (2007) [2005]. German Strategy and the Path to Verdun: Erich von Falkenhayn and the Development of Attrition, 1870–1916 (pbk. ed.). Cambridge: CUP. ISBN 978-0-521-04436-3.
- Saunders, Anthony (2000). Dominating the Enemy: War in the Trenches, 1914-1918. Stroud: Sutton. ISBN 978-0-75092-444-3.
- Frey, Linda; Frey, Marsha, eds. (1995). "Defensive Lines". The Treaties of the War of the Spanish Succession: An Historical and Critical Dictionary (illus. ed.). Greenwood. pp. 126–127. ISBN 978-0-313-27884-6.
- Griffith, Paddy (1996). Battle Tactics of the Western Front – The British Army's Art of Attack 1916–18. Yale University Press. ISBN 0-300-06663-5.
- Griffith, Paddy (2004). Fortifications of the Western Front 1914–18. Oxford: Osprey. ISBN 978-1-84176-760-4.
- Keegan, John (1999). The First World War. New York: Alfred A. Knopf. ISBN 0-375-40052-4.
- Konstam, Angus (2011). Marlborough (illus. ed.). Oxford: Osprey. ISBN 978-1-78096-232-0.
- Murray, Nicholas (2013). The Rocky Road to the Great War: The Evolution of Trench Warfare to 1914. Potomac Books. ISBN 1-59797-553-2.
- Ripley, George; Dana, Charles Anderson, eds. (1859). "Fortification: III Field Fortifications". The New American Cyclopaedia: A Popular Dictionary of General Knowledge. D. Appleton & Company. p. 622.
- Van Creveld, Martin (1980). Supplying War: Logistics from Wallenstein to Patton. Cambridge: Cambridge University Press. ISBN 0-521-29793-1.
