= Trench magazine =

Type of publication during the First World War

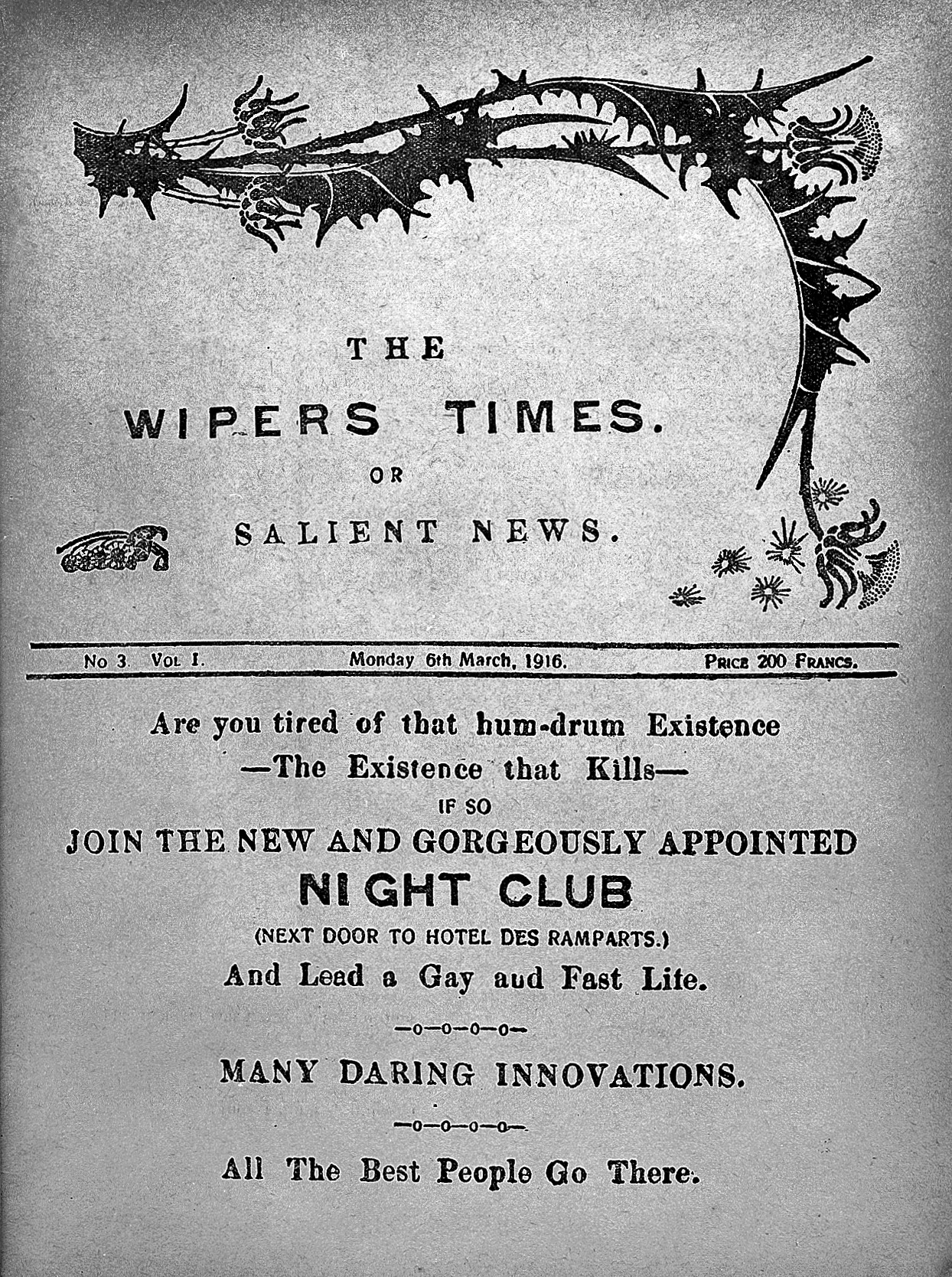
Cover of The Wipers Times, 1916

A trench magazine (also known as a trench journal or trench periodical) describes a type of publication made by and for soldiers during the First World War while living in the trenches. These magazines appear solely within the time frame of World War I (1914-1918), and within Europe, with most being British, French, or German. There were also some minor American, Canadian, and Australian magazines in this genre that existed as well.

== Content ==
Trench magazines contained multitudes of different media, including poetry, short stories, songs, and satirical advertisements and cartoons. They were largely informal and humorous, and contained many examples of "inside" vernacular and jokes.

=== Humor ===
Humor and satire were a large part of the content of the trench journals. Most works of this type took the form of black humor, sometimes making light of subjects widely considered more serious. Short songs ("ditties") and poems often joked about terrible conditions, fear of death, and general cynicism on the perceived hopelessness and pointlessness of the war. The journal of the 55th West Lancashire Division, Sub Rosa, included this poem in 1917:

Little Jack Wrench
Sat down in a trench
With a 'pork and beans' and some bread,
When an Allemande shell
On the parapet fell
So he got 'iron rations' instead.

== Publication and distribution ==
Most journals were manufactured at or near the front lines of the trenches. However, there were many different methods of manufacture, copying, and distribution. For example, some journals were physically printed away from the trenches in England, while some used abandoned printing presses found in old printeries. In terms of duplication, materials such as carbon paper, typewriters, and stencils were used, contributing to the informal and handmade appearance of the magazines.

Before publication, trench journals — like any writing done by a soldier intended to be sent out — went through censorship. In the very first edition of The Wipers Times, an editorial in the beginning reads: "the shadow of censorship enveloping us causes us to refer to the war...in a cautious manner". It was for this reason, also, that the authors of the magazines were often given pseudonyms; their real names never disclosed.

While the journals were first and foremost written for other soldiers to read, some publications were distributed elsewhere. In his book The Soldiers' Press, Graham Seal states that "[the soldiers] conveyed beyond their primary readership ... a carefully constructed version of [their] experience to those back home."

== Notable publications ==
A very well-known trench magazine in the 20th century is the Wipers Times, the periodical of the British Sherwood Foresters. It was manufactured in the city of Ypres, Belgium (the name of which gave rise to the title of the magazine, since "Ypres" was often pronounced "Wipers" by the British soldiers). This particular magazine is representative of the overall cadence of trench literature, being cynical, yet satirical and lighthearted. In the fourth edition of the Wipers Times (also called The "New Church" Times), a satirical essay entitled "The Lecture" begins as follows:

If at any time you happen to be at all depressed—though of course this is extremely unlikely out here where there is so much to interest and delight one—find out whether there is a lecture on anywhere, given by the G.S.O. first or second of a Division about to be relieved, to the officers of the relieving Division, and go to it at once. It will make you realise that war is worth while.

Although hundreds of trench journals existed, the Wipers Times is one of the most widely known and remembered. It has inspired multiple forms of media in the modern day, including the 2013 movie of the same name, the 2006 book by Ian Hislop, and the 2016 play by Hislop and Nick Newman.

== See also ==
- The Wipers Times
