= The Way We Went Wild =

- Narrated by: Josette Simon
- No. of episodes: 3

Original release
- Network: BBC Two
- Release: June 13 – June 27, 2004

The Way We Went Wild is a three-part BBC TV series, first shown on BBC Two, about British wildlife presenters. It was narrated by Josette Simon.

== Episode 1 ==
Episode 1, screened on 13 June 2004, featured Johnny Morris and Bill Oddie.

== Episode 2 ==
Episode 2, screened on 20 June 2004, featured Sir Peter Scott and Sir David Attenborough.

== Episode 3 ==
Episode 3, screened on 27 June 2004, again featured Attenborough, plus a number of more recent, younger wildlife presenters, including Saba Douglas-Hamilton, Steve Leonard and Charlotte Uhlenbroek.

== Interviewees ==
The people interviewed about the featured presenters were:

- Doug Allen
- Richard Attenborough (brother of David)
- Chris Baines
- Linda Barker
- Laura Beaumont (wife of Bill Oddie)
- David Bellamy
- Mike Beynon
- Jeffery Boswall
- Richard Brock
- Tim Brooke-Taylor
- Nicola Davies
- Dudu Douglas-Hamilton
- Iain Douglas-Hamilton
- John Downer
- Alastair Fothergill
- Graeme Garden
- Jane Goodall (uncredited archive footage)
- David Gower
- Hans Hass (archive footage)
- Lotte Hass (archive footage)
- Diane-Louise Jordan
- Eric Knowles
- Betty Leonard
- Dennis Leonard
- Shauna Lowry
- Nigel Marven
- Leonard Miall
- Desmond Morris
- Stephen Moss
- Trude Mostue
- Neil Nightingale
- Terry Nutkins
- Chris Packham
- Don Packham
- Barry Paine
- Michael Peacock
- Julian Pettifer
- Alan Root
- Gaby Roslin
- Mike Salisbury
- Falcon Scott
- Jonathan Scott
- Philippa Scott
- Robert Falcon Scott (uncredited archive footage)
- Keith Shackleton
- Tony Soper
- John Sparks
- Michaela Strachan
- Moira Stuart
- Roger Tabor, cat biologist, The Wild Life of the Domestic Cat
- Alan Titchmarsh
- Colin Willock
- Sheila Young
