= Buxton Glacier =

Glacier in South Georgia

- Location within South Georgia Island
- Type: tidewater
- Location: Saint Andrews Bay; South Georgia
- Coordinates: 54°26′S 36°12′W
- Thickness: unknown
- Terminus: Saint Andrews Bay
- Status: retreating

Buxton Glacier is a glacier flowing northeast between Heaney Glacier and Cook Glacier, on the north coast of the island of South Georgia, immediately south of Mount Skittle. The terminus of Buxton Glacier is located at Saint Andrews Bay. Buxton Glacier is close to Ross Glacier, which is leaving a gravel beach in the wake of its retreat.

== Discovery and naming ==
Buxton Glacier was named by the UK Antarctic Place-Names Committee in 1987 after three members of the Buxton family: Major Aubrey Leland Oakes Buxton (Baron Buxton of Alsa), Pamela Mary Birkin (Baroness Buxton of Alsa), and their daughter the Hon. Lucinda Catherine (Cindy) Buxton, FRGS, who visited South Georgia in March 1982.

== Flora and fauna ==
There is a king penguin (Aptenodytes patagonicus) rookery near the terminus of Buxton Glacier at Saint Andrews Bay. This breeding colony has more than 100,000 penguins. Because of the long breeding cycle, the colony is continuously occupied.

== See also ==
- Retreat of glaciers since 1850
- Glacier mass balance
- List of glaciers in the Antarctic
- Glaciology
