= Götz Dieter Plage =

German cinematographer

- Dieter Plage filming in Rwanda
- Born: 14 May 1936; Germany
- Died: 3 April 1993 (aged 56); Sumatra
- Occupation: Cinematographer
- Years active: 1958-93

Götz Dieter Plage (14 May 1936 in Beelitz – 3 April 1993 in Sumatra), internationally simply known as Dieter Plage, was a German cinematographer of nature documentaries.

== Career ==
Dieter Plage was inspired to be a wildlife cameraman by the work of Bernhard Grzimek, the director of Frankfurt Zoological Gardens, who also made nature documentaries for German television. Plage went to southern Africa in 1958 to work as a freelance photographer. On the recommendation of Prof. Grzimek, he was signed by Aubrey Buxton in 1968 to film for UK-based Anglia Television's natural history unit Survival (TV series) (ITV Network).

Plage's work for Survival soon gained international renown. Aubrey Buxton wrote in tribute to him: "Rather than just film straight natural history in an orthodox fashion, he conceived and covered great stories about people and wildlife in a dramatic manner which enthralled the viewers. He was in every sense an action man." His footage was often the result of perilous circumstances, such as a film from the Kahuzi-Biega NP in the Democratic Republic of Congo where he kept his camera running while being charged by a large silverback Grauer's gorilla. In 1970, on Lake Shala, Ethiopia, he floated a dummy pelican on a large inner tube, putting his head and a camera inside to swim alongside the birds. Though he wore a wetsuit, after some 50 hours in the water corrosive soda burnt large areas of his skin. Two years later, while filming in Manyara, Tanzania, he survived the attack of a charging elephant only by a hair's breadth.

His many award-winning nature documentaries for Survival included Gorilla (1974), The Family That Lives With Elephants (1975), Orphans of the Forest (1976), Tiger, Tiger (1977), The Leopard That Changed Its Spots (1979), Galapagos: Cold on the Equator (1988) and The Secret World of Bats (1991). His last films were A Brush with Nature and Drawn to the Wild made with his friend, German wildlife artist Wolfgang Weber. He shot more documentaries for Survival than any other cameraman, and his work was televised in more than 100 countries. He also filmed for Built for the Kill (National Geographic Channel), and for German television. He chronicled his 18 years working in Africa in a book, Wild Horizons: A Cameraman in Africa, published in 1980 by Collins in London. He and his wife, Mary, who worked alongside him, also co-authored articles for National Geographic Magazine.

== Death ==
In April 1993 Dieter Plage died during an experiment with the prototype of a new miniature airship. He was using the craft to film above the canopy of the Sumatran rainforest when it lost control, became entangled in a treetop and broke up. Dieter fell to his death as a crew member tried to rescue him from another tree. The tragic incident is a central theme of Werner Herzog's documentary The White Diamond, about Graham Dorrington, which was filmed in Guyana in 2004.

== See also ==
- Survival (TV series)
