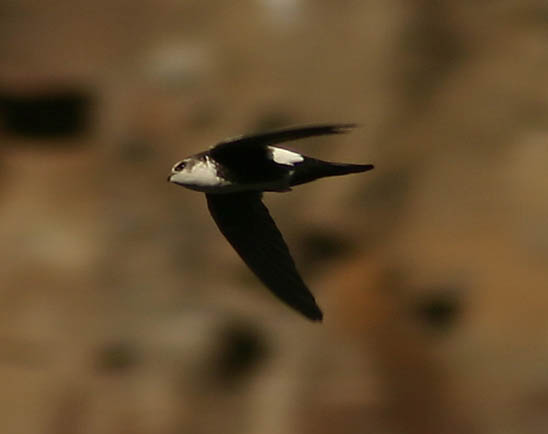
- Spokane County, Washington

Conservation status
- Least Concern (IUCN 3.1)

Scientific classification
- Kingdom: Animalia
- Phylum: Chordata
- Class: Aves
- Order: Apodiformes
- Family: Apodidae
- Genus: Aeronautes
- Species: A. saxatalis

Binomial name
- Aeronautes saxatalis (Woodhouse, 1853)

Subspecies
- Aeronautes saxatalis nigrior Aeronatues saxatalis saxatalis

= White-throated swift =

Species of bird

The white-throated swift (Aeronautes saxatalis) is a swift of the family Apodidae native to western North America, south to cordilleran western Honduras. Its coastal range extends as far north as Northern California, while inland it has migratory populations found throughout the Great Basin and Rocky Mountain regions, ranging as far north as southern British Columbia. White-throated swifts are found in open areas near cliffs, rock faces, or man-made structures, where they roost. Swifts are social birds, and groups are often seen roosting and foraging for flying insects together.

== Description ==
The white-throated swift is medium-sized bird that is primarily black and white. Its back and wings are blackish-brown or black, and its breast, belly, chin, and throat are white. In newly molted adults, the dark feathers may have a slight greenish sheen, though this is rarely observable in the field. Sexes cannot be distinguished by plumage. Juvenile (first basic) plumage is similar to adult (definitive basic) plumage, but with the feathers on juveniles' heads and necks appearing duller and paler.

Adults are generally 15–18 centimeters in length, and have a tail with a relatively shallow 10 millimeter-deep notch. Adult swifts weigh between 28 and 36 grams, with a mean weight recorded as 32.5 grams, and there is no difference in size between males and females. The white-throated swift has a wingspan of 35.5 cm. White-throated swifts can appear similar to American black swifts and Vaux's swifts, which also occur in western North America, but they can be distinguished by their white underparts which both other species lack.

== Taxonomy ==
The order in which white-throated swifts are placed is debated, with some taxonomies placing them in Caprimulgiformes, but others putting them in Apodiformes. The difficulty in taxonomic placement is largely due to the morphological similarities between swifts which make determining the history of evolutionary divergence difficult. At lower taxonomic levels, White-throated swifts belong to the family Apodidae and the genus Aeronautes.Aeronautes includes only two other species, the Andean swift (Aeronautes andecolus) and the white-tipped swift (Aeronautes montivagus). There are two subspecies: A. s. saxatalis, and A. s. nigrior. The A. s. saxatalis subspecies comprises birds that winter in North America south to the Isthmus of Tehantepec in Oaxaca, Mexico, while birds of the A. s. nigrior subspecies are found wintering below Oaxaca south to Honduras. Birds of A. s. saxatalis tend to have a more prominent superciliary streak, darker upper parts, and a broader white abdominal streak than those of A. s. nigrior.

== Habitat and distribution ==
=== Distribution ===
White-throated swifts are year-round residents of coastal and southern California, southern Arizona, southern New Mexico, western Texas, central Mexico, and the Sierra Madre Occidental and Oriental mountains. Migratory breeding populations can be found from Arizona and New Mexico north to southern British Columbia, and from central California east to eastern Colorado and Wyoming. In the southern part of its migratory range, birds arrive in mid-March and depart in mid-October, while in the northern portion, they do not arrive until mid-April to early-May and depart in late-August to mid-September. There are two main areas in which non-breeding wintering populations can be found: the first includes southwestern California, eastern Arizona, the Texas Panhandle, while the second is in El Salvador, Guatemala, Honduras, and the Mexican state of Chiapas.

=== Habitat ===
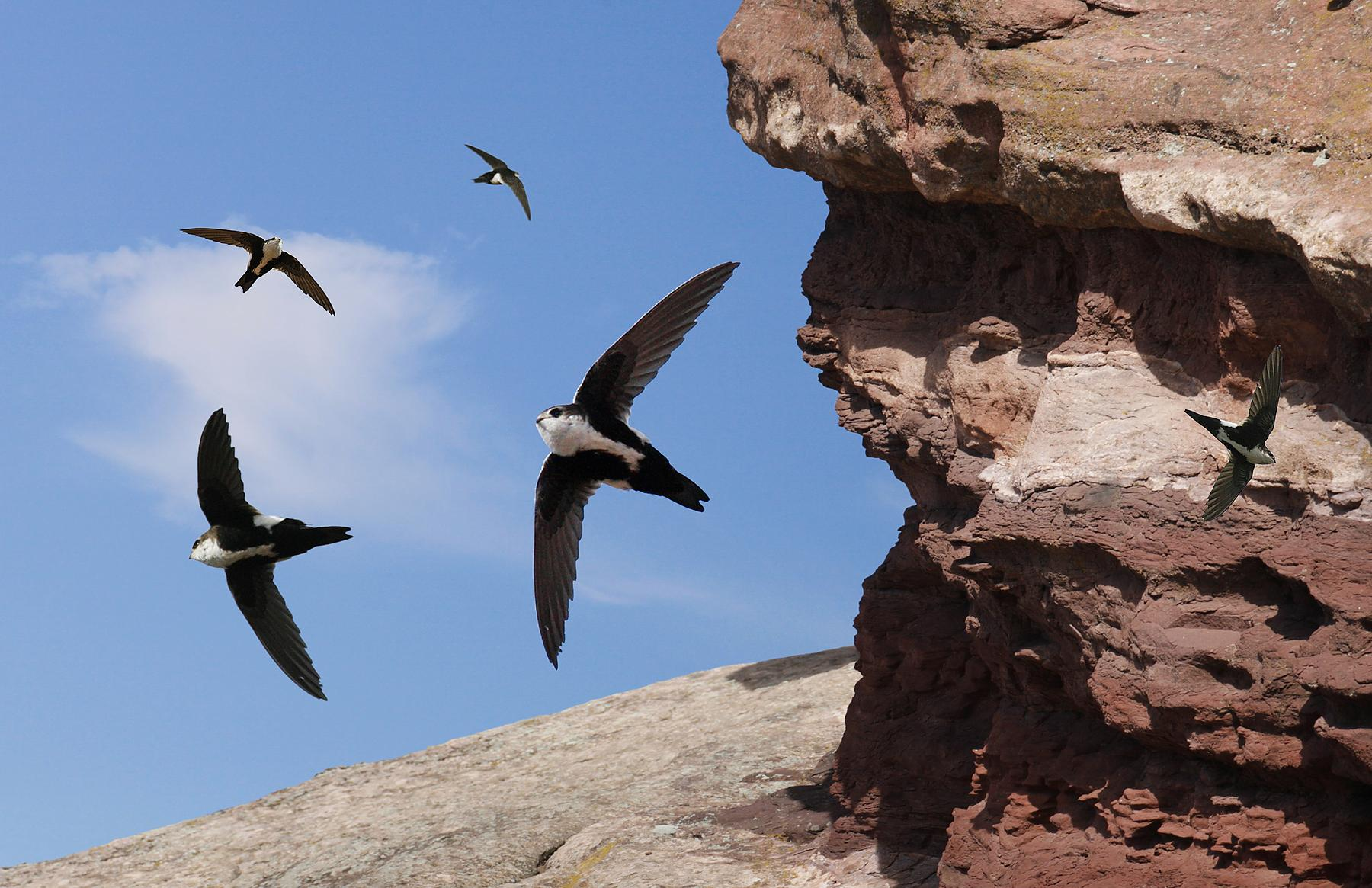
White-throated swifts flying near cliff habitat.

Swifts roost in cliffs, bluffs, and canyons, as well as man-made structures like bridges, overpasses, and walls of quarries. In natural settings, swifts form colonies of as many as 400–500 birds in protected cliff crevices that are generally 6–50 meters above the ground. White-throated swifts will sometimes roost and nest in amongst colonies of swallows, including cliff, violet-green, and northern rough-winged swallows. While foraging, white-throated swifts are found flying over meadows, agricultural fields, and open areas along the edges of ridges and hills.

== Behavior ==
White-throated swifts are rapid fliers who rarely land except to roost. Swifts usually fly 10–100 meters above the ground, and can be observed taking advantage of wind currents and updrafts to gain speed. White-throated swifts usually leave their roosts in the morning, and will remain flying and foraging all day until late afternoon or evening. While in flight, swifts can sometimes be observed bathing by hitting the surface of the water with their underside, which is followed by airborne preening. Occasionally, they will fight with one another while in flight, and may chase or strike other white-throated swifts or violet-green swallows (Tachycineta thalassina).

=== Diet and predators ===
Swifts are aerial insectivores who frequently forage in areas of rising air along the edges of canyons, foothills, or mountains to capture insects. White-throated swifts have also been observed foraging over agricultural lands, and are known to follow harvesting machinery to capture insects disturbed by the equipment. Stomach content analysis has found that beetles, flies, bees, and true bugs (Hemiptera) constitute a majority of the white-throated swift's diet. Adult swifts nourish their nestlings by carrying a bolus of arthropods in their buccal cavity and feeding it to the young. Swifts derive most of their water from their diet but can also be skimming the surface of ponds to drink.

Known predators of White-throated swifts include peregrine falcons, prairie falcons, and American kestrels. When predators are detected, swifts are known to quickly lower their altitude and fly just above the vegetation. There is no data available on levels of nest predation.

=== Vocalizations ===
White-throated swifts make vocalizations while in the air that are described as "staccato chattering", and may also make a sharp one- or two-note call or a shrill drawn-out "scree" call. In the morning and evening, "twittering" sounds may be made at their roost sites. Additionally, juveniles may make begging sounds that are higher-pitched versions of the adult's shrill scree call.

=== Reproduction ===
During the courtship season, white-throated swifts may perform gliding displays and plummeting courtship falls prior to forming monogamous pairs. Once a pair is established, nests made of plant material and feathers held together with saliva are built on rocky cliff faces or human-made structures. These nests are usually 8–10 centimeters across, and 2.5–2.8 centimeters deep, and may be used for several years in a row. An average of 4–5 white matte eggs are laid over the course of 4–6 days, with incubation generally beginning only after the last egg is laid. In southern parts of their range, egg-laying occurs in April, but in more northerly areas, clutches are usually laid throughout May, with a median first-egg date of May 13. The incubation period lasts on average 24 days, with swifts weighing approximately 2 grams upon hatching. Both parents feed the nestlings, and by the time of fledging, swifts may weigh up to 46 grams. There are no documented cases of swifts attempting a second brood if the first nest fails.

== Conservation status ==
Across North America, white-throated swift populations have declined by 2.8% from 1966–1998, which is considered to be a significant decline. Such declines could be related to loss of roosting and nesting sites from quarrying, mining, and the demolition of older buildings, as well as reduction in food supply due to pesticide use. However, in certain areas swift populations appear to have increasing trends, and most populations appear stable. The patchy distribution of this species makes interpreting these data difficult, but the apparent overall decline is of concern given the concurrent declines of other aerial insectivores.
