= Flight of the Snow Geese =

- Written by: Colin Willock
- Narrated by: Sir Peter Scott
- Music by: Glen Campbell
- Country of origin: England
- Original language: English

Production
- Producer: Aubrey Buxton
- Cinematography: Des Bartlett; Jen Bartlett
- Editor: Leslie Parry
- Running time: 52 minutes
- Production company: Anglia Television

Original release
- Network: ITV
- Release: 25 December 1972

Flight of the Snow Geese is a nature documentary from the Survival series.

== History ==
In 1972 Des and Jen Bartlett made this film. They were awarded an Emmy for their efforts. They had followed the 2,500 mile migration of 300,000 geese from Canada's Hudson Bay to the Mississippi Delta. They had adopted fourteen of them and the parental bond enabled them to film them as they jointly migrated. The geese were flying and the Bartletts were inside a station wagon filming them as they travelled together. The eventual footage was screened with a music track by Glen Campbell singing Fly High and Free.

The Bartletts were jointly awarded the Royal Geographical Society's Cherry Kearton Medal and Award in 1974.
