= The White Diamond =

- The White Diamond DVD cover
- Directed by: Werner Herzog
- Written by: Annette Scheurich; Rudolph Herzog
- Produced by: Marco Polo Film AG
- Starring: Graham Dorrington; Werner Herzog; Dieter Plage
- Narrated by: Werner Herzog
- Music by: Ernst Reijseger
- Distributed by: Werner Herzog Filmproduktion
- Release date: 2004
- Running time: 90 minutes
- Language: English

The White Diamond is a 2004 documentary film by Werner Herzog. It illustrates the history of aviation and depicts the struggles and triumphs of Graham Dorrington, an aeronautical engineer, who has designed and built a teardrop-shaped airship which he plans to fly over the forest canopies of Guyana. It features music composed by Ernst Reijseger, which was re-used in Herzog's 2005 film The Wild Blue Yonder.

Most of the film focuses on Dorrington's flights near Kaieteur Falls, in Guyana. Dorrington discusses the mechanics of his flight, as well as his own struggles with uncertainty and the "heaviness" he feels after the death of the cinematographer Dieter Plage. The film also explores the Kaieteur Falls themselves, a local man named Marc Anthony Yhap, a diamond miner, and the white-tipped swifts (Aeronautes montivagus) which roost in an inaccessible cave behind the falls.

The film holds a score of 83 (based on 12 reviews) on the film review aggregator website Metacritic and a score of 90% (based on 20 reviews) on Rotten Tomatoes.

== See also ==
- White Dwarf (dirigible)
- UConn Lumpy
