= Cindy Buxton =

British wildlife film-maker, photographer & author

- Born: Lucinda Catherine Buxton; 21 August 1950 (age 75)
- Education: New Hall School
- Occupation: Film-maker
- Known for: Wildlife films
- Relatives: Lord Buxton of Alsa (father); Tim Birkin (maternal grandfather)

Lucinda Catherine "Cindy" Buxton FRGS (born 21 August 1950) is a British wildlife film-maker, photographer and author.

== Background and education ==
The third of the six children of Lord Buxton of Alsa (founder of Anglia Television and the television series Survival) and Pamela Mary Birkin, daughter of Sir Henry Birkin, she was educated at New Hall School, Chelmsford, Essex.

== Professional career ==
Buxton's first wildlife film was released in 1971, when she was just 21 years old. She later became involved in filming wildlife documentary films (chiefly for her father's nature documentary television series Survival). In 1978 she co-wrote the first scientific paper about the shoebill, in Zambia. Her 1980 book "Survival in the Wild" is about her first 8 years in Africa.

During a filming expedition on South Georgia in March 1982, Buxton and her assistant Annie Price were caught up in the Falklands War. Argentine forces seized control of the east coast of South Georgia on 3 April 1982. Buxton and Price, who had been filming in an isolated part of the island, were trapped for four weeks before they were rescued by a helicopter from HMS Endurance on 30 April. Buxton and Price's experience during Operation Paraquet form part of the background in Charles E. Gannon's science fiction novel, "At The End of the World."

This and her previous three years there and in Antarctica are described in her book Survival: South Atlantic. She was subsequently invited to return for the Falkland Islands' 150th anniversary celebrations in February 1983.

Buxton and Annie Price won the Media Award of the Variety Club of Great Britain for 1982 and Buxton was invested as a Fellow of the Royal Geographical Society. She now works in the field of video presentation of legal proceedings, for Z-Axis, which she joined in 1997.

== South Georgia Island ==
Buxton Glacier (54°26′S 36°12′W) is a glacier flowing northeast into St Andrews Bay, South Georgia. This glacier was named by the United Kingdom Antarctic Place-Names Committee (UK-APC) in 1987 after Buxton and her parents.

== Works ==
=== Films ===
- Nakuru (1971)
- Floating Worlds of Naivasha (1972)
- Edge of the Abyss (1973)
- Almost a Dodo (1975)
- The Last Kingdom of the Elephants (1977)
- The Down Makers (1979)
- Penguin Island (1980)
- Falkland Summer (1981)
- Stranded on South Georgia (1982)
- Opportunity South Atlantic (1982)
- Wideawake Island (1984)
- Rutura : The Volcano that never Dies (1986)
- Mountains of Water (1987)
- Leopard & Hyena : Armies of the Night (1993)
- Built for the Kill (2001)

=== Books ===
- Buxton, Cindy (1980). Survival in the wild. London: Collins. pp. 102 p., [8] leaves of plates : col. ill., 23 cm. ISBN 0-00-216098-6.
- Woods, Robin Wilfrid; Cindy Buxton; Annie Price (1982). Falkland Islands birds. Oswestry: Anthony Nelson. pp. 79p, 32p. of plates (chiefly col.) : ill., 21 cm. ISBN 0-904614-07-7.
- Buxton, Cindy; Annie Price (1983). Survival South Atlantic. London: Granada. pp. xiii, 237p., [64]p. of plates : ill(some col.), maps, col.ports., 26 cm. ISBN 0-246-12087-8.
