= Allan Arthur =

Al(l)an Arthur may refer to:

- Alan Arthur (footballer) (1905–1979), Australian rules footballer
- Allan Arthur (civil servant) (1915–1998), British civil servant
- Allan Arthur (rugby union) (1857–1923), Scottish rugby union player
- Chester Alan Arthur II (1864–1937), American sportsman and art connoisseur also known as "Alan Arthur"
