= White dwarf (disambiguation) =

A white dwarf is a compact star that is no longer generating energy through nuclear fusion at its core.

White dwarf may also refer to:

== Film and television ==
- White Dwarf (1995 film), a 1995 science fiction television film directed by Peter Markle, starring Neal McDonough
- White Dwarf (2012 film), a 2012 film starring Ben Savage
- White Dwarf (2014 film), with Heather Ankeny, Ryan Rottman, Kirsty Mitchell, Julie Mond
- "The White Dwarf", an episode of The Avengers

== Other ==
- White Dwarf (dirigible), a human powered dirigible that has set several world records
- White Dwarf (magazine), a game magazine published by Games Workshop
- Grombrindal the White Dwarf, a dwarf character in Warhammer Fantasy
- "White Dwarf", a song by a-ha from Analogue
