= Colin Willock =

Colin Willock (13 January 1919 – 26 March 2005) was a British author, magazine editor and nature documentary writer and producer, working on series such as ITV's Survival. He also wrote or edited numerous books, including several novels as well as books on angling, shooting and wildlife.

Aubrey Buxton brought him in to work on the first ever programme in the Survival series in 1961, The London Scene. As part of that, the jacket of The Animal Catchers says, Willock went to Uganda and participated in an "attempt to rescue a herd of rare white rhinos and move them to the National Park at Murchison Falls."

He was awarded the Royal Geographical Society's Cherry Kearton Medal and Award in 1987.

== Works ==
- Death in Covert (1961)
- The London Scene (1961)
- The Animal Catchers (1964)
- Flight of the Snow Geese (1972)

== See also ==
- Survival (TV series)
