= Survival (TV series) =

- Titlescreen circa 1990
- Also known as: The World of Survival
- Genre: Nature documentary
- Narrated by: Various
- Country of origin: United Kingdom
- Original language: English
- No. of episodes: 900+

Production
- Producer: Various
- Running time: 30–60 minutes
- Production companies: Anglia Television Natural History Unit; Survival Anglia Ltd; United Wildlife

Original release
- Network: ITV; Channel 4
- Release: 1961 – 2001

Survival is one of television's longest-running nature documentary series. Originally produced by Anglia Television for ITV in the United Kingdom, it was created by Aubrey Buxton (later Baron Buxton of Alsa), a founder director of Anglia TV, and first broadcast in 1961. Survival films and film-makers won more than 250 awards worldwide, including four Emmy Awards and a BAFTA.

The original series ran for 40 years during which nearly 1,000 shows were produced. It was one of the UK's most lucrative television exports, with sales to 112 countries; the highest overseas sales of any British documentary programme. It became the first British programme sold to China (1979), the first to be broadcast simultaneously across the continent of North America (1987) and its camera teams were the first to shoot a major wildlife series in the former Soviet Union (1989–91). It gained a Queen's Awards for Export Achievement in 1974.

Early programmes were all half-hours, but the one-hour Survival Special became ITV's flagship wildlife documentary for three decades, often attracting audiences of more than 10 million. Syndicated versions of the series were also made for Channel 4, for CITV and for regional transmission. Survival achieved great popularity in the US, where a syndicated half-hour series, The World of Survival (narrated by John Forsythe), ran for 12 years, and numerous one-hour films were aired by broadcasters including NBC, CBS and PBS.

The production unit was disbanded in 2001 and the title disappeared from British TV screens. However, the Survival name returned to ITV with the launch of Survival with Ray Mears in 2010. The Survival name was then subsequently used again with a series entitled Survival - Tales from the Wild.

== Structure ==
For many years Survival was made by a subsidiary of Anglia Television, Survival Anglia Ltd (SAL), operating from the company's London offices at Brook House in Park Lane. In 1989, the unit moved to premises in Queen Street, Norwich, close to Anglia TV's headquarters.

Following the 1994 acquisition of Anglia by finance and media company MAI (now United Business Media), and the subsequent formation of United Broadcasting & Entertainment, Survival became part of United Wildlife (1996), linked with Partridge Productions, the Bristol based production company, but continuing to operate from the Norwich base until 2001.

Survival productions were the result of many months, even years, of work in the field. A camera team would typically follow a subject's story "from womb to tomb" to produce a one-hour Special, plus one or more related half-hours. Surplus footage and out-takes were held in a film library, that grew to more than 11 million feet of film and was made commercially available worldwide. SAL also operated one of the UK's biggest wildlife stills libraries, cataloguing and selling images provided by the camera teams.

Many of the world's leading wildlife photographers worked for Survival, including Des Bartlett and his wife Jen Bartlett, Alan Root working with his wife Joan Root, Dieter Plage, Mark Deeble and Victoria Stone, Nick Gordon, Richard and Julia Kemp, Simon Trevor, Doug Allan, Joel Bennett, Liz and Tony Bomford, Cindy Buxton, Bob Campbell, Ashish Chandola, Bruce Davidson, Jeff Foott, Richard Matthews, Hugh Miles, Michael Pitts, Maurice Tibbles and Barbara Tyack.

Commentary for Survival shows was voiced by many leading actors over the years, including Orson Welles, Henry Fonda, David Niven, Anthony Hopkins, John Forsythe, Stefanie Powers, Gene Kelly, Timothy Dalton, Jason Robards, Peter Ustinov and Richard Widmark.

For UK transmissions, the celebrity narrators also included Sean Bean, Richard Briers, Rory Bremner, Ian Holm, Andrew Sachs, Brian Cox, Rolf Harris, Dennis Waterman, Rula Lenska, Toyah Willcox, Robert Powell, Tony Robinson, Diana Rigg and Gaby Roslin, along with naturalists Sir Peter Scott and David Bellamy.

Prince Philip introduced or narrated three Survival films in the 1960s through his association with the Worldwide Fund for Nature (WWF).

Despite the star names associated with Survival, almost all narrators were heard but not seen. When Survival began to achieve success overseas, it was decided to facilitate the programmes' export potential by not having a presenter or narrator in vision. This ensured the commentary could be re-recorded in another language, as required. With a few exceptions, this remained the policy throughout.

== History ==
In 1960, Aubrey Buxton introduced a regional nature programme on Anglia TV called Countryman and saw an opportunity to develop it as a new natural history strand for ITV. The first Survival, broadcast on 1 February 1961, featured the wildlife of London and was introduced by Buxton standing beside the lake in St James's Park, on a derelict bomb site and at other locations accessed in his Bentley. Called The London Scene, the production was facilitated by the backing of Associated-Rediffusion, the then London ITV company.

Buxton, a leading naturalist, who became chief executive and later chairman of Anglia Television, was producer and later executive producer of the series. He remained a guiding influence for over 30 years, and his vision and drive helped the series gain an international reputation for innovation and entertainment allied to scientific integrity. He was made a life peer, Baron Buxton of Alsa, in 1978, and served on many broadcasting, wildlife and countryside bodies.

The deputy editor of Rediffusion's current affairs programme This Week, Colin Willock, was loaned to Anglia for The London Scene and stayed to head Survival's creative team. He wrote or produced almost 500 films over the next three decades. Willock, who had a background in magazine journalism and was also a keen naturalist and wildfowler, used his punchy writing style to create scripts that complemented innovative camerawork and skilful editing. The result was a television genre that was christened "Pop-Nat-Hist", with many early programmes also utilising music commissioned from contemporary composers such as John Dankworth.

For more than 20 years, the day-to-day running of SAL was effectively in the hands of a three-man management team comprising Buxton, Willock and Mike Hay. As general manager and later executive director, Hay had responsibility for overseeing budgets and maintaining logistical links with film-makers in the field, as well as scanning the rushes that arrived in the cutting rooms.

Closely associated with the series from the outset was Sir Peter Scott, a pioneer of natural history programmes on television. He introduced and narrated many early Survival films as well as acting as scientific adviser to the series.

The title Survival was arrived at almost by default. In his book The World of Survival (Andre Deutsch, 1978), Willock revealed it was nearly called Tooth and Claw. "Both Aubrey and I objected to it on the grounds that nature was not really like that. In the end we came up with Survival. It was adopted for the reason that most titles are eventually adopted. No one could think of anything better."

The second Survival was filmed in the heart of East Anglia and featured one of Britain's rarest birds, the avocet. The series went international when Willock was despatched to Uganda to supervise the filming of a story about white rhino being captured and re-located to protect them from poachers.

Early programmes were all of half-hour duration, and there were usually only five or six each year. However, their success led to the introduction of an occasional one hour Special, although the half-hour format remained the principal output and the basis of Survival’s later success. By 1968 the ITV network had committed to 13 half-hour shows a year.

In 1967, Prince Philip presented The Enchanted Isles, a film about the Galapagos Islands and one of the first of the one-hour Specials that eventually became the major components of the series. He had earlier narrated The New Ark, a film from Africa that won Survival its first international award, a Golden Nymph, at the 1963 Festival de Télévision de Monte-Carlo. Prince Philip also went on safari with Survival to Lake Turkana in northern Kenya for the filming of Now or Never, stressing the urgency of the need for conservation in Africa.

The advent of colour broadcasting on ITV by 1969 benefited Survival because most of its films had been shot in colour and were readily available to the network.

== Survival in the United States ==
In 1971, television broadcasting in the United States became subject to the Prime Time Access Rule, aimed at increasing diversity in programming by restricting the amount of network material that local stations owned by, or affiliated with, a network could air during peak viewing hours. The legislation opened the airwaves to cultural and documentary material, with Survival among the beneficiaries.

The New York advertising agency J. Walter Thompson, now JWT, arranged sponsorship by the Quaker Oats Company of the Survival one-hour The World of the Beaver and took a more general interest in Survival’s output. The networks and local station groups were short of documentary material and JWT started a syndication division to supply such programming with the primary objective of attracting advertisers. In partnership with JWT, Survival Anglia set up a New York office, and became the first UK television series to form its own American company. Two JWT executives, Jack Ball and Farlan Myers, were appointed to the SAL board. JWT also provided writers to adapt Survival shows for American audiences - Frank Gannon, Ken Thoren and Jim de Kay - while leading Hollywood actors were routinely engaged for the commentaries.

The link-up proved fundamental in bringing Survival to prominence in the world market during the 1970s and 1980s, and also was largely responsible for SAL winning a Queen's Award to Industry in 1974. Output of half-hour shows for the US market rose to 25 per year and led to expansion of the unit and a corresponding drive for fresh material. Syndicated half-hour shows aired under the title The World of Survival, narrated by John Forsythe from 1971 to 1982, while Survival one-hour films became a mainstay of the PBS Nature series following its launch in 1982 The business structure of SAL's American operation also helped Anglia Television's drama productions, including Orson Welles' Great Mysteries (1973–75) and Tales of the Unexpected (1979–88) to flourish in the US.

SAL also formed partnerships with RKO, Kodak and Home Box Office (HBO), and Survival half-hours were also shown on Discovery Channel.

== Other collaborations ==
For more than 20 years, SAL had a partnership with Oxford Scientific Films (OSF), renowned for their innovative techniques, including macro-photography, and wide scientific reach. The OSF team provided dozens of films, mainly half-hours, for Survival. They included two series titled The Survival Factor on ITV (renamed Wildlife Chronicles for American transmission), the first narrated by the then James Bond actor Timothy Dalton and the other by singer and actress Toyah Willcox.

Survival was a founding partner of Wildscreen, one of the world's leading wildlife film festivals. Lord Buxton was a member of the formative committee, and the enterprise was born out of a collaboration between Survival and the BBC, along with the involvement of the WWF.

A collaboration between Anglia TV and The Jim Henson Company ran from 1994 to 1996 with a children's TV series titled The Animal Show With Stinky and Jake in which animal behaviour film from the Survival library was introduced by puppet characters in a talk-show format. Production took place at Anglia's Norwich studios and the series was sold to broadcasters in Europe and the U.S.

A collaboration between Anglia TV and Warner Bros Animation in 1996 lead to a VHS series, which blended Looney Tunes characters with live-action footage of wild animals from the Survival library (achieved through both editing in scenes from the original shorts with newly recorded dialogue, as well as digitally superimposing the characters onto the animal footage, for comedic commentary and reactions). These were narrated by Kathleen Helppie, and hosted by Bugs Bunny. These were released in themed volumes, under the titles of The World of Sea Lions with Bugs Bunny, The World of Apes with Bugs Bunny, The World of Lions with Bugs Bunny, The World of Elephants with Bugs Bunny and The World of Bears with Bugs Bunny.

== Later years ==
The Survival unit re-located from London to Norwich in 1989. Changes in the structure and management of the organisation were followed by reformation of commercial broadcasting in Britain heralded by the Broadcasting Act 1990. Graham Creelman was appointed executive producer and director of Survival in 1988 and held the post for seven years, subsequently becoming managing director of Anglia Television (1996–2006). He had previously been a senior producer of factual programmes for Anglia, and headed the team that filmed Antarctica: The Last Frontier, a joint project between Survival and its parent company. He was succeeded as executive producer by Petra Regent, a writer and producer with the unit since 1982, who had produced another of Survival’s keynote programmes of the 1980s, The Nature of Russia.

In 1994 Anglia Television was acquired by finance and media group MAI, and subsequently became part of United Broadcasting & Entertainment, with Survival and Partridge Films linked in a natural history production business called United Wildlife. The mid-1990s saw a shift of emphasis in ITV towards presenter-led wildlife shows, notably those featuring Steve Irwin and Nigel Marven. Survival Specials continued to be commissioned, and generally achieved good audience ratings, although as stand-alone programmes in an increasingly volatile schedule, their slots were vulnerable to change or cancellation. Survival broke with tradition and engaged an on-camera presenter when Gaby Roslin fronted a six-part series of half-hour shows in 1995 under the title Predators, screened by ITV in a Sunday evening slot. Despite good ratings, however, a second series was not commissioned.

In 2000 Granada Television acquired United's broadcasting business and in January 2001, days before the 40th anniversary of Survival’s first broadcast, announced plans to close the Norwich operation with the loss of up to 35 jobs. Wildlife programming was to be consolidated under Granada Wild and based at Bristol. The decision, Granada said, was due to "the changing demands of UK and international broadcasters". It added that markets were "hungry for popular documentary techniques, the use of presenters and the inclusion of more science". The high cost of making blue chip nature documentaries was cited as a reason for Survival’s demise by some commentators, and disquiet over the decision was expressed in several quarters. The Guardian reported that some insiders condemned the decision as "an attempt to be trendy", while the Independent described it as "a bloody cull".

In 2006, ITV announced the return of wildlife programming to Norwich along with the re-location of the Granada Wild film library, including the Survival and Partridge catalogues. And in spring 2009 ITV said the Survival title was returning, with three shows featuring leopards, bears and wolves, to be hosted by animal tracking expert Ray Mears. The first Survival with Ray Mears, focusing on leopards in Namibia, was screened on 18 April 2010. The Survival name was then subsequently used again with a series entitles Survival - Tales from the Wild, screened on ITV1 in 2011. The 60 minute episodes, numbering 15 in total, were created from the Survival archive to create new stories.

The Survival archive has also been used in compiling the clips for the ITV wildlife video website itvWILD.

In January 2012, ITV Studios announced its intention to close production facilities at its Norwich base stating, "volume is no longer at the level necessary to sustain the overheads and investment needs".

== Notable films ==
The London Scene (1961) The first Survival and a landmark for television natural history. The London Scene was screened on ITV on 1 February 1961 and presented by Aubrey Buxton. The capital was chosen because television viewing was concentrated in urban areas and demonstrating how creatures like foxes, Arctic geese, herons and even a puffin shared the living space with the citizens of London, had obvious appeal. But actually filming the animals in an urban environment was not so straightforward, as associate producer Colin Willock later explained. "The wildlife content of the programme was a bit of laugh, in retrospect. Apart from a few feral pigeons, some ducks in St James's Park, and a fox let out of a laundry basket on a wild night in a quiet street just off Hampstead Heath, the wildlife scenes had been shot anywhere but in London. To be fair, we never suggested that our puffin was standing outside the Thames Embankment entrance to the Savoy Hotel. We merely said that one had been found there and then proceeded to show the bird in its wild state - in Pembrokeshire..."

S.O.S. Rhino (1961) Survival's first film shot in Africa and the show that did much to establish the series' credentials. S.O.S. Rhino was one of television's first major conservation films, depicting the hazardous capture by lasso of a dozen white rhino threatened by poachers in Uganda and their 200-mile relocation to a national park. The safer method of drugging large animals with darts had yet to be perfected when the operation took place. Uganda National Parks defrayed some of its costs by selling the exclusive film rights to Anglia for £1500. Colin Willock supervised the filming with John Buxton, a cousin of Aubrey, and Chiels Margach, a Ugandan settler of Scottish origin, as cameramen. A tense score from John Dankworth emphasised the dramatic footage, the production having, in Willock's words, "the roar, dust and danger of the chase in every frame", including a sequence where the truck he occupied came under sustained attack from an angry rhino.

The Year of the Wildebeest (1974), Safari by Balloon (1975), Mysterious Castles of Clay (1978), Two in the Bush (1980) and A Season in the Sun (1983) African films shot through the lens of Kenya-based film-maker Alan Root, working with his then wife, Joan. The Roots' strong narrative style characterised much of Survival’s output. The Year of the Wildebeest was the epic story of the thundering migration of wildebeest herds across the plains and rivers of the Serengeti. Mysterious Castles of Clay, by contrast, showed wildlife in intricate detail in and around termite mounds, revealing the insects' highly organised society and skills of construction. It received a nomination for an Academy Award. The Roots used a hot-air balloon to film sequences for the wildebeest film, and further explored its usefulness to film animals on the mountains and plains of East Africa in Safari by Balloon. Highlight of their journey was the first hot-air balloon flight over Mount Kilimanjaro. Two in the Bush (re-titled Lights, Action, Africa! in the US) included footage of a spitting cobra directing its venom at Joan's face positioned just a few feet from the snake while Alan filmed. A Season in the Sun, an account of wildlife's struggle to survive the heat and drought of the dry season, won an Emmy and a Peabody Award after it was aired by PBS in 1987. Alan and Joan Root were responsible for many of Survival's most successful films for almost 20 years from the mid-1960s. After their partnership ended, Alan Root continued his association with Survival as a cinematographer, producing his own films and guiding the early African work of camera team Mark Deeble and Victoria Stone, while latterly also acting as adviser to the series.

The Enchanted Isles (1967) Alan and Joan Root went to the Galapagos Islands to make a film that retraced the voyage of Charles Darwin, whose observations of the islands’ unique wildlife famously helped formulate his theories on evolution. Aubrey Buxton, in his role as an equerry to Prince Philip, had accompanied the Prince on a visit to the islands in 1964 and both were struck by the urgent need for scientific research and preservation. As the then chairman of the British Appeal of the WWF, Prince Philip agreed to present and narrate Survival’s one-hour documentary as a means of drawing attention to the importance of protecting the islands’ ecology. The programme was subsequently bought by NBC for $430,000 and became the first ever natural history film to be networked on American television.

The World of the Beaver (1970), The Flight of the Snow Geese (1972), The Lions of Etosha (1982), Survivors of the Skeleton Coast (1991) Multi award-winning films shot by Australian camera team Des Bartlett and wife Jen, whose work did much to cement the popularity of the series with American TV audiences. The World of the Beaver, narrated by Henry Fonda, featured underwater footage of beavers in a crystal clear beaver pond in the Teton Mountains of Wyoming. Flight of the Snow Geese is arguably the most successful Survival film of all: it won two Emmys, one for cinematography for Des and Jen Bartlett and the other for editing by Les Parry. The Bartletts followed snow geese on their 2,500-mile migration from Hudson Bay to the Mississippi Delta. They "adopted" orphans that regarded them as parents and could be filmed in close-up from the back of a moving station wagon. The programme, screened on ITV on Boxing Day 1972, was narrated by Peter Scott and featured a song by Glen Campbell, who also narrated the American version on NBC. Lions of Etosha featured a pride of 19 lions, led by two big males, in Etosha National Park, Namibia, the country where Des and Jen based themselves for almost 30 years. Des was originally cameraman for Armand Denis, and joined Survival when Armand retired in 1966. He and Jen formed another of the husband-and-wife film-making partnerships that were a feature of Survival's operation. They shot many other documentaries for Survival over the years - in the U.S., Africa, Australia and South America - and enjoyed a long association with National Geographic, for whom they filmed Survivors of the Skeleton Coast, a 1993 Emmy award-winner, also shot in Namibia.

The Forbidden Desert of the Danakil (1973), Gorilla (1974), Orphans of the Forest (1975), Tiger, Tiger (1977), The Secret World of Bats (1991) German film-maker Dieter Plage joined Survival in 1968 and was one of the pillars of the series until his death in a fall from an airship while filming in Sumatra in 1993. Gorilla, narrated by David Niven, was one of the first documentaries to highlight the conservation efforts to save Africa's mountain gorillas. It featured the work of conservationist Adrien de Shryver and included a memorable sequence when his attempts to acclimatise an orphaned baby gorilla to its wild cousins ended dramatically as a huge silverback male charged through the bushes, snatched the baby from de Shryver's arms and carried it to his family. In The Forbidden Desert of the Danakil, Plage retraced an expedition made by explorer Wilfred Thesiger into the heart of Africa's desolate Danakil Desert. It included tense encounters with Danakil tribesmen, and Dieter later admitted it was a mission fraught with danger. "They traditionally castrate intruders to protect their water and grazing. I never felt fully relaxed while filming them...". Orphans of the Forest was voiced by Peter Ustinov and followed a scheme to help endangered orangutans in Sumatra by taking animals kept in captivity and rehabilitating them for a return to the rainforest. Next Plage headed for Nepal and northern India where he shot an acclaimed profile of tigers in Chitwan and Dudhwa National Parks. Tiger, Tiger, narrated by Kenneth More, included much night filming using an image intensifier. In one incident, Plage's assistant, Mike Price, found himself eyeball to eyeball with a tiger through the slit of his canvas hide. Plage shot more films for Survival than any other cameraman. For 16 years he was accompanied by his wife Mary, whom he married in 1977; she shot stills and organised their camps in some of the remotest locations on Earth. Dieter was lead cameraman on a major Survival series shot in the Galapagos Islands in the 1980s and then tackled probably his most challenging assignment to shoot The Secret World of Bats. Filmed on five continents, the programme was the supreme test of Plage's considerable camera skills. Working with one of the world's leading bat experts, Merlin Tuttle, he explored in detail the amazing behaviour of bats and their vital role in the planet's ecology. He had just returned to Sumatra to update the story of the orangutans' battle for survival when he met his death while filming above the forest canopy.

Here Be Dragons (1990), The Tides of Kirawira (1992), A Little Fish in Deep Water (1996), Tale of the Tides (1999), Mzima: Haunt of the River Horse (2001) Husband and wife camera team Mark Deeble and Victoria Stone, who had made their Survival debut with a half-hour film about Lundy Island in the mid-1980s, went to East Africa to work under the direction of Alan Root and produced a series of award-winning documentaries through the 1990s. The first, Here Be Dragons was a spectacular account of the continent's biggest crocodiles ambushing migrating wildebeest at the Grumeti river in Tanzania. Its first screening on ITV was watched by over 11 million viewers. The seasonal variations that affect the Grumeti and the surrounding Serengeti plains were the focus of The Tides of Kirawira, a similarly dramatic exploration of the seasonal pools that dot the terrain, and the intricate survival techniques adopted by animals that depend on the shallows in the dry season, or on rains that swell the ponds into a vibrant waterland. A Little Fish in Deep Water was filmed in Lake Tanganyika, one of the world's biggest freshwater lakes, and focused on the cichlid family of fish and their varied behaviour and bizarre breeding methods, along with the wildlife that shares the crystal clear waters, from puffer fish to otters and crocodiles. The film was the Golden Panda Award winner at the Wildscreen Festival in 1996. In Mzima: Haunt of the River Horse, Deeble and Stone used the latest diving technology and developed new filming techniques to capture close-up footage of crocodiles and hippos. They also discovered an underwater hippo graveyard in a flooded cave system and witnessed the poignant infanticide of a tiny baby hippo that had been born in the pool. The film won an Emmy for music and sound design, as well as winning 10 "best of festival" prizes around the world.

Giant Otter (1990), Tarantula! (1991), Creatures of the Magic Water (1995), Jaguar - Eater of Souls (2001) Nick Gordon was a film-making explorer, dubbed an Indiana Jones for his exploits in the demanding and often dangerous environment of the Amazon rainforest. He spent 15 years shooting films for Survival, in Africa as well as South America, culminating in a definitive portrait of the jaguar that was seven years in the making. His first Survival one-hour focused on the giant otter, and the sanctuary afforded the animal in Guyana by conservationist Dianne McTurk. Gordon went to Venezuela to film the dinner-plate-sized Goliath birdeater spider that became the subject of his film Tarantula!, along with the nativePiaroa people who both worship and eat the spiders. He first explored the almost mystical story of the jaguar and its place in the culture and folklore of the native peoples in Creatures of the Magic Water, and completed his study of the shy and elusive big cats by working closely with the Yanamamo and Matis peoples. The title, Jaguar - Eater of Souls, reflected the tribal belief that a jaguar spirit devours the souls of the departed. The Matis formed an integral part of the film because of the way the jaguar dominates their culture and rituals. Gordon travelled the rainforest by dugout canoe and imported scaffolding into the heart of the forest to build 150-foot filming towers. He had a camp where he looked after orphaned animals, including two jaguars, and shared in some of the rainforest people's unusual rituals during the course of his filming. The debilitating tropical environment took a toll on his health and he resolved to spend time in the UK. He returned to the Amazon to shoot more films for a production company he had set up, and died there from a heart attack aged 51 in 2004.

The Mysterious Journey (1983), The Bonebreaker's Mountain (1987), Wolf! The Spanish Outlaw (1991) Richard and Julia Kemp made their mark with one of the most arduous film-making expeditions carried out for the series. They travelled 6000 miles across Sudan, accompanied by their four-year-old son Malcolm, filming the migration of white-eared Kob antelope. As well as showing the wildlife they encountered en route, Mysterious Journey told the story of their contact with the Murle and Kichepo tribespeople who hunt the antelope for food. In the 1980s, the Kemps made a number of Survival films in Spain, including three one-hour specials culminating in Wolf! The Spanish Outlaw, that revealed the ability of the Eurasian wolf to maintain a foothold in the country's northern hills, despite its age-old conflict with village communities. The rugged terrain also provided the setting for The Bonebreaker's Mountain featuring the giant lammergeier - half vulture, half eagle - that drops large animal bones from its talons to smash on the rocks in order to extract nutritious bone-marrow. The film included rare footage of a tiny population of Eurasian brown bears clinging precariously to existence on the Pyrennean mountain slopes of Asturias.

Stranded on South Georgia (1982) One of the most extraordinary episodes in Survival’s history took place in 1982 on the island of South Georgia when filmmaker Cindy Buxton (a daughter of Aubrey) and assistant Annie Price were caught up in the Falklands War. The women were filming penguins when the island was invaded, and although Argentine troops never reached their remote location in St Andrew's Bay, the pair were cut off for almost a month until being rescued by a helicopter from HMS Endurance. Cindy and Annie, who had flown a Union Jack on a makeshift flagpole at their camp, found a heroes’ welcome awaiting them when they returned to the UK. Their adventures were featured alongside the wildlife in a one-hour film Stranded on South Georgia and they subsequently recounted their experiences in a book Survival: South Atlantic. The programme was re-titled King Penguin: Stranded Beyond the Falklands in the US where it was narrated by Orson Welles and received an Emmy Award nomination in 1983.

Daphne Sheldrick and the Orphans of Tsavo (1984), Together They Stand (1986), Elephants of Tsavo: Love and Betrayal (1989), Hell or High Water (1997) Former game warden turned filmmaker, Simon Trevor, produced a number of award-winning films for Survival during a 30-year association with the series. Several of his films were shot in and around Kenya's Tsavo National Park, where he has his home, and featured the ongoing struggle faced by the park's animals, especially elephants, to survive in the face of natural and man-made threats. His film about the work of Daphne Sheldrick, widow of Tsavo's first warden, was the heart-warming story of her efforts to save orphaned elephants and other animals. Together They Stand was an intimate portrait of the African dwarf mongoose and was Survival's first Golden Panda winner at the Wildscreen film festival. Trevor later highlighted renewed threats to the elephant population from poaching and culling in Elephants of Tsavo: Love and Betrayal, an account drawing on his film record of Tsavo's wildlife shot over three decades. Hell or High Water showed what happened to animals and their habitats when Tanzania's Great Ruaha River ran dry for the first time in living memory, and then torrential rains transformed the river into a torrent. Trevor, who also directed and filmed wildlife sequences for Hollywood movies including Out of Africa and Gorillas in the Mist, subsequently set up the African Environmental Film Foundation to produce educational films for Africans on environmental issues.

Battle of the Bison Forest (1984), Hunters of the Silver Shoals (1996) Tony Bomford, another of Survival's long-serving cameraman, was assisted on most of his early films by his first wife Liz, and also by Tim Borrill. In 1984, Bomford became one of the first wildlife filmmakers to shoot a major documentary in Communist eastern Europe when he gained rare footage of the European bison and Przewalski's horse in Poland's Bialowieza Forest, ancient hunting grounds of Polish kings and Russian tsars. Actress Rula Lenska, herself descended from Polish nobility, narrated the ITV programme. Tony also filmed for Survival in Russia in the late 1980s. He had an especially close affinity with the Shetland Islands and, in 1994, shot Hunters of the Silver Shoals looking at the delicate marine food chain and charting the impact on the environment of the 1993 oil spill from the tanker MV Braer. It was his last film for Survival. He was diagnosed with bone cancer after a fall while filming in India, and died in 2001

Killer Whale (1987) The first British television show to be screened simultaneously across the continent of North America, shown by the CBS network in the US and the Canadian Broadcasting Corporation in a Friday evening slot in 1987. The film, showing killer whale behaviour both in the wild and in captivity, was shot by American photographers Jeff Foott, Luisa Stoughton and Joel Bennett, and the American version was narrated by Lloyd Bridges.

Antarctica: The Last Frontier (1989) A celebration of the wildlife of the world's last great wilderness, coupled with a warning about the threat from future human activity posed by a possible breakdown of the international treaties protecting Antarctica. Sir Peter Scott acted as programme consultant and Anthony Hopkins spoke the commentary.

The Nature of Russia (1992) Following the signing of a co-production agreement between SAL and Soviet broadcaster Gostelradio in 1988, cameras teams went to Siberia, the Volga, the Steppes and the forests and mountains of the Russian Far East to capture images of stunning landscapes and creatures seldom filmed before. The footage was edited into three one-hour films under the generic title The Nature of Russia. A highlight was cameraman Richard Kemp's nocturnal encounter with one of the world's rarest animals, a Siberian tiger. "As he looked towards me I sensed his power. It’s something you can’t forget," Kemp said.

Highgrove - Nature's Kingdom (1993) Television's first in-depth insight into the wildlife and countryside of the Prince of Wales's estate at Highgrove in Gloucestershire. Cameraman Maurice Tibbles spent 18 months filming the story through the changing seasons, including the future King's commitment to organic farming and conservation.

Predators (1995) A half-hour series produced for primetime Sunday evening viewing on ITV found then Big Breakfast presenter Gaby Roslin on location to introduce film of some of the natural world's most successful predators. Each of six shows focused on a particular species; Roslin went on African safari to focus on lions, leopards and African hunting dogs and to North America where she sat in a snake-pit with 50 serpents, sailed alongside killer whales and came face to face with a grizzly bear.

Mountain Gorilla - A Shattered Kingdom (1996) Survival revisited the endangered mountain gorillas of the central African forests two decades after Dieter Plage's landmark film Gorilla. Bruce Davidson spent seven years on the volcanic slopes of Virunga National Park filming the animals’ complex society and the pressures they faced from human interference. His close association with the gorillas had a tragic end when the main stars of his film, three silverback males and a female, became victims of the Rwandan Civil War that spilled into the national park.

Animals in Action (1980s) Survival Anglia's long-running children's wildlife series began in 1980 with artist Keith Shackleton as the first presenter. Later Mike Linley, a producer and scientific adviser for Survival, fronted the series. Animals in Action allowed a younger audience to explore different aspects of animal behaviour and explained the science behind it. Survival produced over 180 programmes especially for children in the form of Animals in Action, and later the Jim Henson collaboration, The Animal Show with Stinky and Jake.

Hunt for the Red Whales (2001) Survival Anglia's film made in the region of the Bering Strait in Chukotka (Russia) and Alaska (USA) about Killer whales of the Bering sea and local hunters and fishermen. There can't be many people whose ambition is to swim with killer whales, but for adventurer Afanassi Makovnev it was a dream come true when he got the opportunity to take to the water with them. This special episode of Survival follows him across Russia, Alaska and Norway as he photographs, studies and finally joins the whales in their natural habitat. David Suchet narrates.

== Main awards ==
Year	Film/Recipient	Award
1963	The New Ark	Golden Nymph, Monte Carlo International Television Festival.
1968	The Enchanted Isles	Golden Nymph, Best Colour Production, Monte Carlo.
1972	Secrets of the African Baobab	Golden Hugo Award, Chicago International Film Festival.
1973	The Incredible Flight of the Snow Geese	Emmy Award for cinematography to Des and Jen Bartlett, Emmy Award for editing to Les Parry - Academy of Television Arts and Sciences.
1974	Survival Anglia Limited	Queen's Award to Industry for exceptional overseas sales.
	The Empty Desert	Special Prince Rainier prize, Monte Carlo.
	The World You Never See	Golden Gate Award, best network documentary Special, San Francisco International Film Festival.
	Trial by Wilderness	Special Jury Award, best network documentary, San Francisco.
1975	Year of the Wildebeest	Golden Gate, best network documentary special, San Francisco
	Gorilla	Special Jury Award, best network documentary, San Francisco.
1976	Come Into My Parlour	Special Jury Award, best network documentary, San Francisco.
1978	Mysterious Castles of Clay	Oscar nomination for best television film documentary, Academy of Motion Picture Arts and Sciences. George Foster Peabody Award. Special Jury Award for best network documentary, San Francisco.
1980	The Seas Must Live	Special Award, First Commonwealth Film and Television Festival for outstanding contribution to the understanding of the problems of marine ecology.
1981	The Last Round-Up	Special Prince Rainier prize, Monte Carlo.
1982	Two in the Bush	1st prize, International Scientific Cinema Award, 5th International Scientific Research Film Festival of Ronda
1983	Two in the Bush	Best film, Tokyo International Wildlife Film Festival.
	A Season in the Sun	Best Wildlife/Outdoor Documentary, BANFF Television Festival, Canada
	King Penguin: Stranded Beyond the Falklands	Emmy nomination in 'outstanding informational special' category - Academy of Television Arts and Sciences.
	Lights, Action, Africa!	Winner, nature/wildlife category, Audubon International Film Festival, New York
1984	Lights, Action, Africa!	Golden Gate Award for best overall film, San Francisco.
	King Penguin: Stranded Beyond the Falklands	Best arts and sciences network documentary, San Francisco. Best of Festival, 21st Annual National Outdoor/Travel Film Festival, Michigan.
	The Lions of Etosha	Emmy nomination in 'outstanding informational special' category - Academy of Television Arts and Sciences.
1986	Survival	Gold Medal of the Royal Television Society for 25 years of consistent excellence.
	Together They Stand	Golden Panda Award for best film, Wildscreen International Wildlife Film and Television Festival, Bristol.
1987	A Season In The Sun	Emmy Award (to PBS ‘Nature’ Series) - Academy of Television Arts and Sciences. George Foster Peabody Award.
1988	Lord Buxton	Central Award for Outstanding Achievement, Wildscreen, Bristol.
	Wildlife Chronicles	Award for Cable Excellence (ACE).
	The Bonebreaker's Mountain	Golden Gentian, Trento Mountain Film Festival.
1989	Lord Buxton and Survival	TV Editors’ Special Award for Contribution to Television over 30 years.
	Great Wood of Caledon	Overall Winner, Montana Wildlife Film Festival.
1990	Here Be Dragons	Special Award, Wildscreen, Bristol.
	Antarctica - The Last Frontier	Special Award, Wildscreen.
	Queen of the Beasts	1st Prize, International Nature Film and Television Festival, India.
	Wild River, No More	1st Prize, 4th International Exhibition of Documentary Films on Parks, Italy.
1991	Here Be Dragons	Best of Festival, 14th International Wildlife Film Festival, Missoula. Grand Teton Award, Best of Festival, Jackson Hole Wildlife Film Festival, Wyoming.
	The Tide of War	Best Nature Film, Okomedia - 8th International Ecological Film Festival.
1992	Madagascar - Island of Ghosts	Golden Panda Award for best film, Wildscreen, Bristol.
	The Secret World of Bats	Best Cinematography, Best of Category in TV documentary non-series, Merit Awards for editing, for increased awareness of a persecuted wildlife group, and for excellence in low-light cinematography, Missoula Wildlife Film Festival, US. 1st Prize, Festival International du Film Nature et Environment de Grenoble, France.
1993	Tarantula!	Grand Prix, 10th International TV Science Programme Festival, Paris.
	Keepers of the Kingdom	Special Jury Award, Golden Gate Awards, San Francisco.
1994	The Tides of Kirawira	Special Jury Award (Nature Category), Golden Gate Awards. Special Jury Award for Craft and Survival Anglia/Dieter Plage Award for Revelation, Wildscreen. Grand Prix, 11th International Science TV Festival, Paris.
	Tarantula!	Grand Prix, 4th Festival International du Film Animalier, Albert, France.
1995	The Tides of Kirawira	Grand Prix, 5th Festival International du Film Animalier, Albert, France. World Medal, New York Festivals.
	A Little Fish in Deep Water	Grand Prix, 12th International TV & Science Programme Festival, Paris. Palme d'Or (Grand Prix), 22nd World Festival of Underwater Films, Antibes, France
	Mountains of the Snow Leopard	Special Jury Award, Golden Gate Awards, San Francisco.
1996	A Little Fish in Deep Water	Panda Award for best film, Wildscreen, Bristol.
	Survival Camera Teams	Special Award, BAFTA (British Academy of Film & Television Arts).
	A Space in the Heart of Africa	Survival Anglia/Dieter Plage Award for Revelation, Wildscreen.
	Mountain Gorilla - A Shattered Kingdom	Special Jury Award for Animal Portrait, Wildscreen. Best film on Mountain Environments and People's Choice Award, BANFF Festival, Canada.
1997	Mountain Gorilla - A Shattered Kingdom	Golden Spire Winner in Nature Category, Golden Gate Awards, San Francisco. Best Animal Behaviour, Jackson Hole Wildlife Film Festival, Wyoming
	A Little Fish in Deep Water	Best Documentary, Japan Wildlife Film Festival, Tokyo. Best Overall Film, Progetto Natura International Nature Film Festival, Valle D’Aosta, Italy
	Hunters of the Silver Shoals	Grand Prix de Ménigoute, 13th International Ornithological Film Festival, Ménigoute, France.
1998	Polar Bear: Shadows on the Ice	Panda (Animal Behaviour Award), Wildscreen, Bristol.
	Tale of the Tides	Palme d'Or and Prix du President de la Republique, 25th World Festival of Underwater Pictures, Antibes, France. Gold Medal, New York Festivals
1999	Tale of the Tides	Best of Festival, International Wildlife Film Festival, Missoula. Best Nature Film, Mountain film in Telluride, Colorado. Best Film (Golden Ibex Trophy), 9th Valle d’Aosta International Nature Film Festival, Milan. Grand Prix, 16th International Television Science Programme Festival, Paris
	Ice Whales	Palme d'Or, 26th World Festival of Underwater Pictures, Antibes, France. Best Film - European Nature Film Festival, Valvert, Belgium
2000	Tale of the Tides	Grand Prix, 1st International Festival of Nature Films, Poland.
	Jurassic Shark	Winner, Animal Behaviour Society Film Festival, Abington, US
	Swamp Alligator	Gold Award, Australia Cinematography Society.
	Jaguar: Eater of Souls	Best Television Programme, International Biennial of Scientific Films, Ronda. Best Science and Nature Film, 11th Telescience Festival, Montreal.
2001	Mzima: Haunt of the River Horse	Emmy Award, music and sound design - Academy of Television Arts and Sciences. Emmy nomination, outstanding science and nature film. Peabody Award. Grand Teton, best of festival, Jackson Hole International Film Festival, Wyoming. Best of Festival, Japan Wildlife Festival. Best of Festival, International Wildlife Film Festival, Missoula. Best of Festival, World Underwater Festival, Antibes, France. Best of Festival, Festival International du Film Animalier, Albert, France. Best of Festival, Telluride Mountain Film Festival, Colorado. Best of Festival, Public Choice Award, Internationales Natur und Tierfilmfestival, Germany. Best of Festival, Sondrio International Festival, Italy. Best of Festival, Progetto Natura, Italy. Best of Festival, Waga Brothers International Film Festival, Poland.

== Print references ==
- Willock, Colin (1978). The World of Survival. London: Andre Deutsch. ISBN 0-233-97029-0.
- Walshe, Tom; Bevan, Colin; Phillipson, Naomi; Sealy, Ruth (1999). A Knight on the Box. Anglia Television. ISBN 0-906836-40-9.
- Buxton, Cindy; Annie Price (1983). Survival: South Atlantic. Granada. ISBN 0-246-12087-8.
- Bousé, Derek (2000). Wildlife Films. Penn. ISBN 0-8122-3555-X.
