= Nicholas Jones =

Nicholas Jones may refer to:

== Entertainment ==
- Nic Jones (born 1947), British folk singer and guitarist
- Nicholas Jones (actor) (born 1946), British actor
- Nicky Jones (born 1996), American musician and former child actor
- Nick Jones (writer) (born 1978), American playwright, screenwriter, and performer
- Nicky Wire (Nicholas Allen Jones, born 1969), Welsh musician, member of the Manic Street Preachers
- Nick Thornton Jones, of Warren Du Preez and Nick Thornton Jones, a London-based photographic and filmmaking duo

== Sports ==
- Nic Jones (American football) (born 2001), American football player
- Nick Jones (offensive lineman, born 1985), American football player
- Nick Jones (offensive lineman, born 2000), American football player
- Nick Jones (basketball) (born 1945), NBA and ABA player
- Nick Jones (ice hockey) (born 1990), American ice hockey defenceman

== Other ==
- Nicholas Jones (artist) (fl. from 2018), British artist
- Nicholas Jones (politician) (died 1695), Irish politician who represented Naas in the Irish House of Commons
- Nicholas Jones (journalist) (born 1942), British political and industrial relations journalist
- Nick Jones (entrepreneur) (born 1963), British restaurateur and club proprietor

== See also ==
- Nick Farr-Jones (born 1962), former Australian rugby union footballer
