= St. Andrews Bay =

St. Andrews Bay may refer to:

- St. Andrews Bay (Florida), United States
- St Andrews Bay (Fife), Scotland
- St Andrews Bay, South Georgia
