= Des Bartlett =

Australian documentary filmmaker (1927–2009)

Norman Desmond Bartlett (2 April 1927 – 12 September 2009) was an Australia filmmaker who worked on nature documentary series such as Survival.

== Early life ==
Bartlett was born on 2 April 1927 at Canungra, Queensland, Australia. His father had Australia's largest collection of butterflies and introduced Bartlett to natural history.

== Works ==
- Flight of the Snow Geese (1972)

== Awards ==
He was married to fellow filmmaker Jen Bartlett. They were jointly awarded the Royal Geographical Society's Cherry Kearton Medal and Award in 1974.

== See also ==
- Survival (TV series)
