= Johnny Morris (television presenter) =

British television presenter (1916–1999)

Johnny Morris OBE
- Born: Ernest John Morris; 20 June 1916; Newport, Monmouthshire, Wales
- Died: 6 May 1999 (aged 82); Swindon, Wiltshire, England
- Occupations: Television presenter; actor
- Years active: 1946–1993
- Employer: BBC
- Known for: Tales of the Riverbank (1960); Animal Magic (1962–1983)

Ernest John Morris (20 June 1916 – 6 May 1999) was a British television presenter and actor. He was known for his children's programmes for the BBC on the topic of zoology, most notably Animal Magic, and for narrating the Tales of the Riverbank series of stories.

== Early life ==
Morris was born on 20 June 1916 in Newport, Monmouthshire, Wales, the son of a postmaster. He learned to play the violin as a child and toured the valleys of South Wales, performing with his cello-playing father. Morris attended Eveswell Junior School and then Hatherleigh School, Newport, and worked as a solicitor's clerk, a timekeeper on a building site, and a salesman before managing a 2,000-acre (810 ha; 8.1 km^{2}) farm in Aldbourne, Wiltshire for 13 years.

== Radio and television career ==
Morris was discovered telling stories in a pub by the then BBC Home Service West Regional producer Desmond Hawkins. Morris made his radio début in 1946, and featured in a number of regional series throughout the 1950s. He was often employed on light entertainment programmes as a storyteller, such as in Pass the Salt, or as a commentator on local events.

A natural mimic and impersonator, Morris first appeared on television as The Hot Chestnut Man (1953–1961), a short slot in which he was shown sitting roasting chestnuts. He would tell a humorous yarn in a West Country accent, often ending with a moral.

In 1960, he narrated the imported, Canadian-produced Tales of the Riverbank series of stories about Hammy the Hamster, Roderick the Rat, GP the Guinea Pig, and their assorted animal friends along a riverbank. The show used slowed-down footage of real animals filmed doing humanised things such as driving a car or boat, and living in houses. In the 1960s Morris also narrated books 1–11 of The Railway Stories, recordings of the Railway Series books by the Rev. W. Awdry. The recordings of the first eight books were re-released in LP format in the 1970s but the other three sets of recordings were never reissued and in the end were rerecorded by Willie Rushton. In 1965, he narrated ' The Customer ', a short film for the Ford Motor Corporation. During the 1980s he also recorded a few audiobooks for Sylvanian Families.

Morris's ability to create a world which children could relate to through his mimicry led to his best-known television role, that of the presenter, narrator and 'zoo keeper' for Animal Magic. For more than 400 editions, from 1962 until 1983, and with inserts shot at Bristol Zoo Gardens, Morris would create comic dialogues with the animals, whom he also voiced. His regular companion on the show was Dotty the ring-tailed lemur. When the idea of imposing human qualities and voices upon animals fell out of favour the series was discontinued. Morris very rarely worked with spiders, having a phobia that he wished to keep from the public.

Morris carried over his comedic commentary technique into other programmes, such as Follow the Rhine, a BBC2 travelogue which included a witty Morris commentary featuring his companion Tubby Foster – actually his producer Brian Patten. Follow the Rhine was based on Morris's earlier BBC Radio 4 series Johnny's Jaunts. These series chronicled not only the Rhine journey but other worldwide journeys and were broadcast between 1957 and 1976. Included in this series were tales based upon his visits to such places as Austria (a skiing misadventure!), Spain, Hong Kong, Japan, USA, Singapore, Malaysia, Thailand, South America, South Sea Islands, France; and even a cruise on the River Thames.

Morris was Vice President of the Bluebell Railway in Sussex from its early days in the 1960s until the late 1980s, attending several anniversaries and landmark events over the first few decades of the railway's existence. He also made two promotional LPs for the railway in the 1970s, one of which was released on the Discourses Label (DCM1209), 'Johnny Morris on the Bluebell Railway'. He released other recordings, too: 'Sights and Sounds of Britain', a 1975 Flexidisc (Lyntone 2881) and 'It's a Dog's Life' (Lyntone 2462), a single promoting Winalot dog foods, which, oddly, played at 33⅓ rpm.

In the 1970s, Morris read children's bedtime stories for the Post Office to be heard via the telephone. Children could dial 150 and hear a different story over the telephone each week; these included the Peter Pixie stories written by Olive Hyett. He was also a presenter on BBC Schools Radio's Singing Together, and wrote and read stories on BBC Schools Radio's A Service for Schools which was later renamed Together.

In a nod to his role with Animal Magic, Morris also added his voice to the award-winning Creature Comforts series of electricity advertisements, created by Aardman Animations. These advertisements featured animated claymation animals speaking about their life and conditions in a way comparable to the dialogues that Morris had created in the earlier television show.

Although latterly criticised in the 1990s for his anthropomorphic technique of introducing television viewers to animals, Morris was active in environmentalism, and in his eighties demonstrated against the building of the Newbury bypass near his home. In June 2004, Morris and Bill Oddie were jointly profiled in the first of a three part BBC Two series, The Way We Went Wild, about television wildlife presenters.

Morris was awarded the OBE in 1984. His autobiography, There's Lovely, was first published in 1989.

== Death ==
A diabetic, Morris collapsed at his home in Hungerford, Berkshire, in March 1999 when he was about to star in a new animal series Wild Thing on ITV. Admitted to the Princess Margaret Hospital, Swindon, Wiltshire for tests, he was discharged to a nursing home in the Devizes and Marlborough district, where he died on 6 May 1999., the same day as Desmond Hawkins who had first discovered him.

His wife, Eileen, had pre-deceased him by 10 years; he had two stepsons. He bequeathed his house to his co-host on Animal Magic, Terry Nutkins; a large sum of cash to his housekeeper, Rita Offer; and smaller sums to his gardener and his builder; but he left nothing to his stepsons, his step-grandchildren and step-great-grandchildren – possibly because a failed business partnership had cost him £500,000.

== Bibliography ==
Morris was also a writer. His books include:

- Just Like you and Me – ISBN 0-900873-66-3
- Around the World in Twenty Five Years – ISBN 978-0718122294 (also a BBC radio series)
