= White Dwarf (dirigible) =

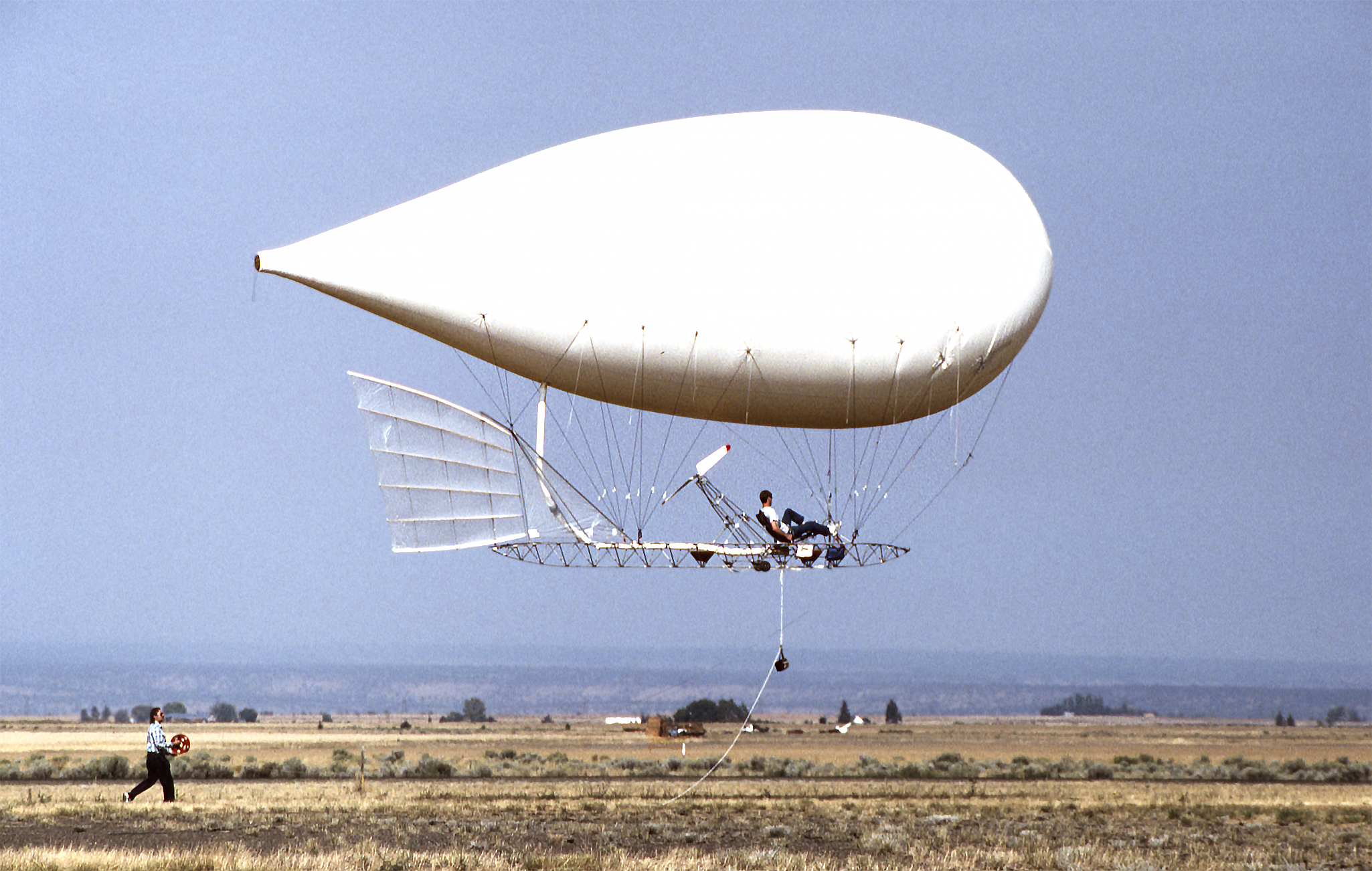

General information
- Type: Human powered dirigible
- National origin: United States
- Manufacturer: Aerosystems Inc
- Designer: Bill Watson; Bryan Allen

History
- First flight: 28 August 1984

The White Dwarf is a human-powered dirigible built in 1984 that set several world records.

== Development ==
The White Dwarf was commissioned and funded by comedian Gallagher, whose interest in airships was sparked by a radio-controlled flying watermelon prop he used in his stage act. It was constructed by Bill Watson, who was part of the team that built the Gossamer Albatross human-powered craft.

== Design ==
The dirigible features a teardrop-shaped lift bag. The aluminum fuselage is a truss design with a single pilot seat on top with a chain-driven pusher propeller, 64 inches in length, positioned in front of a rudder. It weighs 150 lb (68 kg).

== Operational history ==
The White Dwarf set several world records with pilot (and engine) Bryan Allen. It was flown a distance of 58.08 mi (93 km) in 8 hours and 50 minutes.

== Specifications (White Dwarf) ==
Data from Jane's All the World's Aircraft 1985-86

General characteristics

- Crew: 1
- Length: 48 ft (15 m)
- Diameter: 15 ft (4.6 m)
- Height: 27 ft (8.2 m)
- Volume: 6,200 cu ft (180 m^{3})
- Empty weight: 140 lb (64 kg)
- Max takeoff weight: 390 lb (177 kg)
- Propellers: 2-bladed, 5 ft 4 in (1.63 m) diameter

Performance

- Maximum speed: 14 mph (23 km/h, 12 kn)
- Cruise speed: 8.0 mph (13 km/h, 7.0 kn)
- g limits: g

== See also ==
- The White Diamond
- UConn Lumpy
