= My Life as an Animal =

- Genre: Reality television
- Presented by: Rebecca Wilcox
- Starring: Terry Nutkins
- Country of origin: United Kingdom
- No. of series: 1
- No. of episodes: 4

Production
- Executive producers: Richard McKerrow; Elliot Reed
- Running time: 1 hour

Original release
- Network: BBC Three
- Release: 16 April – 7 May 2009

My Life as an Animal is a British reality television series broadcast on BBC Three and presented by Rebecca Wilcox. In each episode, two volunteers spend four days with a different species of animal, living how they live in an attempt to be accepted by the animals as one of them. They also find out how to communicate with the animals and see their entire life cycle. They are guided by wildlife expert Terry Nutkins.

== Episodes ==
1. Pigs (16 April 2009)
2. Horses (23 April 2009)
3. Dogs (30 April 2009)
4. Penguins and Seals (features the Humboldt penguin and the harbour seal.) (7 May 2009)
