= Aubrey Buxton Nature Reserve =

Nature reserve in Essex, England

Coordinates: 51.9154°N 0.2101°E

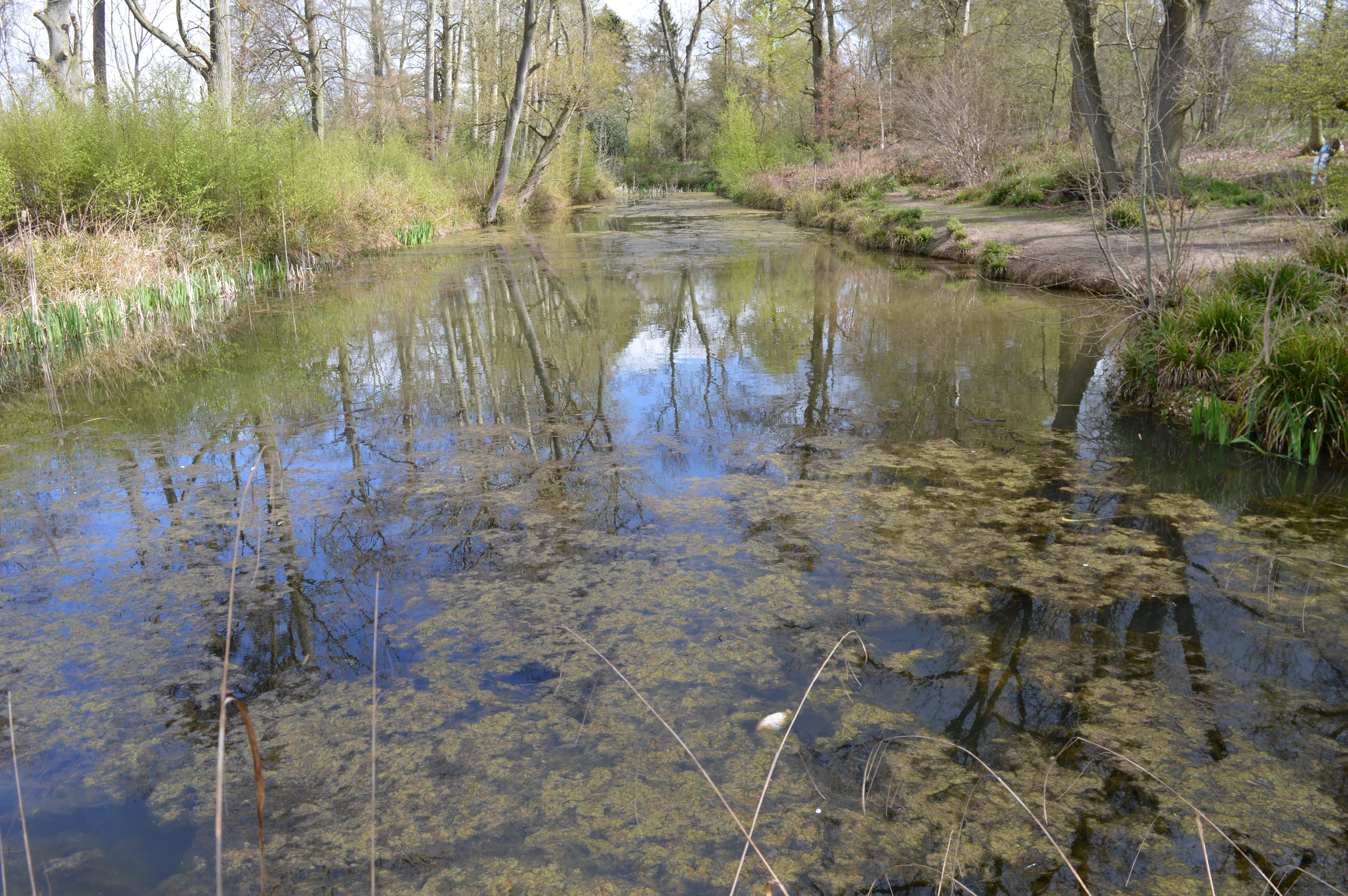
- Interactive map of Aubrey Buxton Nature Reserve
- Type: Nature reserve
- Location: Elsenham, Essex
- OS grid: TL 521 264
- Area: 9.7 hectares (24 acres)
- Manager: Essex Wildlife Trust

Aubrey Buxton Nature Reserve is a 9.7-hectare (24-acre) nature reserve west of Elsenham in Essex. It was donated to the Essex Wildlife Trust by Aubrey Buxton and his wife in 1976.

The site was previously a park for Norman House. It is woodland on a sandy and gravel soil, with meadows and six man-made ponds. Grassland plants include cowslips, wild strawberries and common spotted orchids. There are birds such as nuthatches and woodpeckers, and many species of butterfly. Black poplars, which are the county's rarest native tree, have been planted to replace trees lost to storm damage.

There is access from a track off Alsa Street.
