= Joan Root =

Kenyan conservationist, ecological activist and filmmaker (1936–2006)

- Born: 18 January 1936; Nairobi
- Died: 13 January 2006 (aged 69)
- Occupation: activist
- Spouse: Alan Root

Joan Root (18 January 1936 – 13 January 2006) was a Kenyan conservationist, ecological activist and Oscar-nominated filmmaker. With her film-maker husband, Alan Root she made a series of acclaimed wildlife films. The couple divorced in 1981 and Alan Root settled in Nairobi afterward.

== Early life ==
Born in Nairobi in 1936 as Joan Wells-Thorpe, Root was the daughter of Edmund Thorpe, a British banker who immigrated to Kenya to start a new life and became a successful coffee planter. Her mother was Lilian (Johnnie) Thorpe, née Walker.

== Work ==
Decades before wildlife films such as March of the Penguins, Joan and Alan Root pioneered filming animal migrations without interference from human actors. Their movies were narrated by such distinguished actors as Orson Welles, David Niven, James Mason and Ian Holm. Their 1979 Survival documentary, "Mysterious Castles of Clay", was nominated for an Academy Award for Best Documentary.

The Roots introduced Dian Fossey to the gorillas she later died trying to save, took Jacqueline Kennedy Onassis over Kenya in their balloon, and covered much of Africa in their famous single-engine Cessna, their amphibious car, and their balloon, at one time equipped with a raft for water landings.

Following the Roots' divorce, she received the Lake Naivasha farm, along with their airplane and a cash settlement for the films they had made together.

After her divorce Joan Root became very involved in conservation projects at and around Lake Naivasha, included supporting scientists and volunteers from the Earthwatch Institute who were monitoring environmental conditions. She also chaired and funded an anti-poaching "Task Force" in the area. The Task Force strictly enforced fishing restrictions around Lake Naivasha, arresting fishermen and confiscating and burning nets, in an attempt to stop overfishing and in particular catches of undersized fish. This was however controversial with locals who saw Lake Naivasha as a necessary and communal resource of food.

== Murder ==
On 13 January 2006, five days before her 70th birthday, Joan Root was murdered at her home in Lake Naivasha by four men who came to her door carrying AK-47s. There were many suspects such as disgruntled former employees, criminal gangs, organized crime rackets, poachers, those whose economic interests were threatened by her activism and even Task Force members. The four men who were arrested and charged with her murder pleaded not guilty and were acquitted in August 2007. Some involved in the case believe it was a contract killing, but the question of who paid for it remains unanswered.

== Biography ==
Mark Seal's biography of Joan Root, Wildflower: An Extraordinary Life and Mysterious Death in Africa was published by Random House in 2009. The book originated from researching an article for Vanity Fair in 2006 when Seal was intrigued by a news report about the wildlife pioneer's death. Working Title Films optioned the film rights for Root's story before the book was written.

== Filmography ==
- Mizma: Portrait of a Spring (1972)
- Baobab: Portrait of a Tree (1973)
- Balloon Safari Over Kilimanjaro (1975)
- Year of the Wildebeest (1976)
- Mysterious Castles of Clay (1978)
- Lights, Camera, Africa (1980)
- The Blood of the Rose (2009) Sheffield Green Award

== See also ==
- List of White Africans
- Whites in Kenya
