= Jen Bartlett =

British film director (1932–2025)

- in 1971
- Born: Jen Edmondson; February 3, 1932; Wahroonga
- Died: May 20, 2025 (aged 93)
- Education: Hornsby Girls' High School
- Occupation: wildlife film maker
- Known for: tennis, stills photography and films
- Spouse: Des Bartlett

Jen Bartlett (born Edmondson) (3 February 1932 – 20 May 2025) was an Australian tennis player and filmmaker who worked on nature documentary series such as Survivors of the Skeleton Coast and The Flight of the Snow Geese.

== Biography ==
Bartlett was born in Wahroonga, Australia on 3 February 1932. Her parents came from New Zealand and they had two sons before Jan was born. She attended Hornsby Girls' High School in Sydney and her father passed on his enthusiasm for photography to her. Her first work was as a dentist's assistant. She took an early interest in tennis and she won some tournaments. In 1956 she was competing at Wimbledon in Women's Singles where she made the second round and she again met her future husband.

In 1959 she married filmmaker Des Bartlett. She learned more photography on the job. The couple lived on the Skeleton Coast, southwest coast of Namibia, for nine years while filming for the National Geographic.

In 1972 they filmed The Flight of the Snow Geese. They were awarded an Emmy for their efforts. They had followed the 2,500 mile migration of 300,000 geese from Canada's Hudson Bay to the Mississippi Delta. They had adopted fourteen of them and the parental bond enabled them to film them as they jointly migrated. The geese were flying and the Bartletts were inside a station wagon as they travelled together. The eventual remarkable footage was screened with a music track by Glen Campbell singing Fly High and Free.

The Bartletts were jointly awarded the Royal Geographical Society's Cherry Kearton Medal and Award in 1974.

In 1993 she and Des made Survivors of the Skeletal Coast. In 1997 they made ten more wildlife films based in Africa with another in 1999.

When National Geographic made a list of the top 100 wildlife photos of the twentieth century, five of them were Bartlett's.

Bartlett died on 20 May 2025, at the age of 93.

== Works ==
- Flight of the Snow Geese (1972)
