= Animal Magic (TV series) =

British TV children's series (1962–1983)

- Opening title, 1970
- Presented by: Johnny Morris
- Country of origin: United Kingdom
- Original language: English
- No. of series: 42
- No. of episodes: 440

Production
- Running time: various

Original release
- Network: BBC One
- Release: 13 April 1962 – 8 March 1983

Animal Magic is a BBC children's television series which ran from 13 April 1962 to 8 March 1983 from BBC Bristol. It began fortnightly and was transmitted weekly from 1964.

The presenter was Johnny Morris. The show combined jovial voiceovers applied to various animals from Bristol Zoo with some basic educational features.

Morris' co-presenters over the years were Gerald Durrell, Tony Soper, Keith Shackleton, Roger Tabor, Sheila Young, David Taylor and Terry Nutkins. When Nutkins joined the show in the early 1980s, the producers tried to update it, using new video effects technology. This allowed them to do such things as "shrink" the presenters to allow them to see life from an ant's viewpoint, or to swim in a riverbed for example. Joe Henson and Desmond Morris also appeared on the show. Dotty the ring-tailed lemur appeared as a regular guest for eight years in the 1970s. Other animal stars included the sea lion Gemini, and two parrots, Cocky (a sulphur-crested cockatoo) and Brolly (an umbrella cockatoo). The show was discontinued in 1983 when the programme's anthropomorphic treatment of animals fell out of fashion. A new children's wildlife series, The Really Wild Show, began in 1986, with the former Animal Magic co-presenter Terry Nutkins as the main host.

One edition, broadcast in late 1979, featured Tom Baker in character as The Doctor from Doctor Who, discussing ferocious animals on Earth and other worlds. During this programme, the Doctor references the events of the then-current serial, The Creature From The Pit.

The 100th edition was transmitted on 4 January 1967.

Many editions of the show were junked by the BBC in the early 1990s when they were assumed to be of no further use. Recent documentaries such as The Way We Went Wild have had to resort to using clips from off-air recordings of some shows.

In addition to airing on the BBC, the series was also aired on ABC in Australia, TV One in New Zealand and Channel 5 in Singapore.

== Theme tune ==
The signature tune, "Las Vegas", performed by Group Forty Orchestra, was written by Laurie Johnson for KPM in 1960. It more recently featured as the theme music for BBC Two comedy W1A (2014–2017). Around 1980, the original orchestral version was replaced by a funk arrangement (featuring an electric guitar with a wah wah pedal).
