= Singing Together (radio) =

BBC Radio series

- Genre: Music
- Running time: 20 minutes
- Country of origin: United Kingdom
- Language: English
- Home station: BBC Home Service (1939–1967); BBC Radio 4 (FM: 1967–1990; DAB: 2004); BBC Radio 5 (1990–1994); BBC Radio 3 (1990–2002)
- Hosted by: Various (see below)
- Original release: 25 September 1939 – 29 March 2001
- Audio format: Stereophonic sound

Singing Together is a BBC Radio schools series which ran from 25 September 1939 to 29 March 2001, with repeats until 25 June 2004. Its origins were in Community Singing which was considered necessary at the outbreak of the Second World War following the mass evacuation of children.

Market-led changes in British broadcasting, the decline in airtime given to schools radio and increasing pressures on school time brought about by the National Curriculum were to put pressure on the series and would eventually lead to its demise.

== History ==
The programme was originally presented by Herbert Wiseman, Director of Music to the Edinburgh Corporation Education Committee. From the beginning, it featured an array of popular, mainly traditional, mostly British songs; more songs from elsewhere in the world would be added later.

The programme was briefly presented by Ernest Bullock, by Cyril Winn "and a male voice quartet" and by the unrelated Ronald Biggs before its most famous presenter, William Appleby, arrived in summer term 1948. Appleby, who had been a teacher in Doncaster from 1939, remained as presenter for the next 22 years, during which time the BBC Home Service - where the programme had always been broadcast - became Radio 4 in 1967. In 1968 Douglas Coombes arrived as producer, a role he would maintain until he left the BBC twenty years later.

=== 1970s and 1980s ===
Appleby left the series in 1970, the same year he retired as Music Organiser for Doncaster, and died three years later; there is now a Music Centre in that town named in his memory. He was initially replaced by John Huw Davies and then by Fergus O'Kelly, Cliff Morgan and Eugene Fraser. It was also presented alternately during the 1970s and early 1980s by Ian Humphris, John Camburn, John Amis, Johnny Morris, Blain Fairman and Stephen Varcoe. In the summer term of 1980, Douglas Coombes presented the show himself and he returned in the spring term of 1982. In the autumn term of 1981, the series moved from its traditional Monday morning slot to the same time, 11.00 am, on Wednesdays. In the autumn of 1983, Brian Kay presented the series and in autumn term 1984 it was fronted by Andrew Shore. In autumn 1985 - hosted again by Fergus O'Kelly - it moved to Fridays but was back on Wednesdays a year later although it was replaced in summer 1987 by Singing Along. For the 1988–89 school year repeated programmes were transmitted.

In the autumn of 1989, a modernised version of the series made its debut, now produced by Janet Wheeler and presented by John Asquith and Verity Ann Meldrum; this featured a more contemporary slant in the songs and styles featured, male and female co-presenters to provide a broader range of voices and a "more informal" atmosphere to the programmes.

=== 1990s decline, further repeats ===
In the autumn of 1990, the series moved to the original BBC Radio 5, although with a repeat in the early hours in FM stereo on BBC Radio 3. Spring Term 1991 saw the presenters change once more; former BBC That's Life! reporter Grant Baynham and ex-Doctor Who assistant Sophie Aldred (Ace) took over the reins and each term the songs focused more on a 'theme' with practically no traditional folk songs present. Production of new programmes in the series ceased in 1992, but programmes originally broadcast from 1989–92 were repeated in a further three-year cycle from 1992–95; after the old Radio 5 was replaced by BBC Radio 5 Live in March 1994 this was initially, and controversially, in the afternoons on Radio 3 but then moved to overnight transmission. From 1995–97 the programmes originally broadcast from 1989–91 were repeated for a third time, finishing in the summer of 1997.

=== Later years and demise ===
Finally, in a very different Britain from the one in which the programme had begun at the outbreak of war six decades earlier, the programme was revived as Singing Together: Celebrate!, featuring celebratory songs from multiple cultures and traditions. New programmes aired in the small hours on Radio 3 in spring term 2000 and spring term 2001. There were repeat transmissions in summer 2002 and finally - by then in the small hours on the digital version of Radio 4 only - in the summer of 2004.

== Legacy and archive status ==
The most widely-heard and recalled years of Singing Together are not well represented in the BBC's archives; only three programmes are believed to exist officially from its first 40 years on the air, although some recordings were made by members of the public and CDs containing some 1970s episodes have been sold on eBay. In November 2014, Jarvis Cocker traced the programme's history and influence on multiple generations for an Archive on 4 programme; at the same time, the BBC's website ran a magazine article recounting the programme's history and The Spectator ran its own tribute.

== See also ==
- BBC School Radio
