= Heaney Glacier =

Glacier in Antarctica

- Location within South Georgia Island
- Location: South Georgia
- Coordinates: 54°25′S 36°12′W
- Length: 4 nmi (7 km; 5 mi)
- Thickness: unknown
- Terminus: Saint Andrew Bay
- Status: unknown

Heaney Glacier (54°25′S 36°12′W) is a glacier, 4 nautical miles (7 km) long, which lies close northwest of Cook Glacier and flows northeast and then east toward Saint Andrews Bay on the north coast of South Georgia. It was surveyed by the South Georgia Survey, 1951–52, and named by the UK Antarctic Place-Names Committee for John B. Heaney, a surveyor with that expedition.

== See also ==
- List of glaciers in the Antarctic
- Glaciology
