= Mysterious Castles of Clay =

- Opening titles
- Directed by: Joan Root; Alan Root
- Produced by: Joan Root; Alan Root
- Narrated by: Orson Welles
- Production company: Survival Anglia
- Distributed by: ITV
- Release date: 1978
- Country: United States
- Language: English

Mysterious Castles of Clay is a 1978 documentary film about a termite colony filmed in Kenya by Joan and Alan Root, and narrated by Orson Welles. The documentary was produced for the television nature documentary series Survival and it was nominated for an Academy Award for Best Documentary Feature and received a Peabody Award.

One version of the film, known as simply Castles of Clay, was narrated by British actor Derek Jacobi.

== Preservation status ==
Because the original film was lost, only three copies are known to exist in the United States. One of these is in the possession of famed nature documenter Ken Burns; another is in the possession of the science department of the Colorado Rocky Mountain School.

== See also ==
- Orson Welles filmography
- Survival
