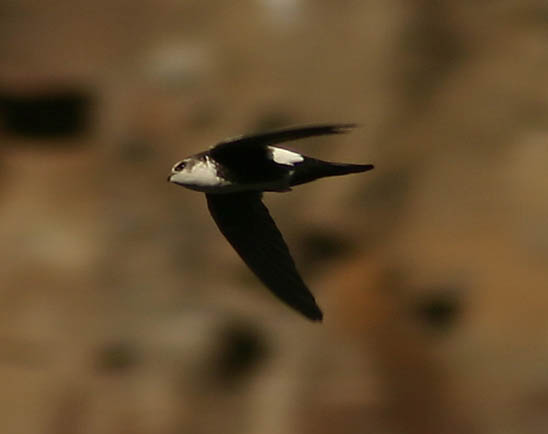
- White-throated swift (Aeronautes saxatalis) in Washington

Scientific classification
- Kingdom: Animalia
- Phylum: Chordata
- Class: Aves
- Order: Apodiformes
- Family: Apodidae
- Tribe: Apodini
- Genus: Aeronautes; Hartert, 1892

Type species
- Cypselus melanoleucus Baird, 1854

Species
- see text

= Aeronautes =

Genus of birds

Aeronautes is a genus of swifts in the family Apodidae.

It contains the following species:

Image	Common name	Scientific name	Distribution
	White-throated swift	Aeronautes saxatalis	Western North America, from southwestern Canada south through the western United States to Honduras.
	White-tipped swift	Aeronautes montivagus	Disjunctly in the Andes from Venezuela and Colombia south to Bolivia and Argentina, with populations in Central America (Costa Rica, Panama) and local ranges in northern South America.
	Andean swift	Aeronautes andecolus	The Andes of Peru, Bolivia, Chile, and western Argentina.
