= Graham Dorrington =

English aerospace engineer

Graham Dorrington (born in Chalfont St. Giles), is an English aerospace engineer. He received his PhD from the University of Cambridge in 1989 and was formerly a lecturer at Queen Mary, University of London, though he is now teaching at RMIT University in Melbourne, Australia. He was the subject of the film The White Diamond (2004) directed by Werner Herzog.

Graham is a founder of Lunaria One and currently the Principal Investigator of the ALEPH-1 lunar mission.
