= Cherry Kearton Medal and Award =

British nature photography award

The Cherry Kearton Medal and Award is an honour bestowed by the Royal Geographical Society on "a traveller concerned with the study or practice of natural history, with a preference for those with an interest in nature photography, art or cinematography". It is named for nature photographer Cherry Kearton and was launched in 1967.

== Recipients ==
Source: Royal Geographical Society

- 1970: Henry Hamilton Beamish OBE
- 1971: Eugen Schuhmacher
- 1972: David Attenborough CBE
- 1973: Heinz Sielmann
- 1974: Des Bartlett/ Jen Bartlett
- 1975: Eric Ashby
- 1976: Dr Pamela Harrison
- 1977: Jeffrey Boswall
- 1978: Anthony Smith
- 1979: Rick Mason
- 1980: David Hughes
- 1981: Barry Paine
- 1982: Hugh Falkus
- 1983: Mike Andrews
- 1984: The Hon Lucinda Buxton
- 1985: Adrian Cowell
- 1986: Hugh Miles
- 1987: Colin Willock
- 1988: Dr Bradford Washburn
- 1989: Adrian Warren
- 1990: Julian Pettifer
- 1991: Peter Jones
- 1992: Mark Edwards
- 1993: Douglas Allan
- 1994: Jonathan Scott
- 1995: Paul Harris
- 1996: Alastair Fothergill
- 1997: Adrian Arbib
- 1998: Professor Jonathan Kingdon
- 1999: Dr Martha Holmes
- 2000: Carol Beckwith/ Angela Fisher
- 2001: Les Hiddins
- 2002: Tony Foster
- 2003: not awarded
- 2004: Pat Keough and Rosemarie Keough
- 2005: Michael Martin
- 2006: not awarded
- 2007: not awarded
- 2008: not awarded
- 2009: Simon King
- 2010: Frans Lanting
- 2011: Dale Templar
- 2012: Andy Rouse
- 2013: Yann Arthus-Bertrand
- 2014: Jens Bjerre
- 2015: Sebastião Salgado
- 2016: Wendy Darke
- 2017: Harry Hook
- 2018: Andy Goldsworthy
- 2019: Tacita Dean
- 2020: Steve McCurry
- 2021: David Coulson
- 2022: Nicholas Jones
- 2023: Harriet Fraser and Rob Fraser
- 2024: Leon McCarron

== See also ==
- List of general science and technology awards
- List of European art awards
- List of geography awards
- List of photography awards
- List of awards named after people
