= Terry Nutkins =

English naturalist (1946–2012)

- Nutkins in 1996
- Born: Terence Paul Nutkins; 12 August 1946; Marylebone, London, England
- Died: 6 September 2012 (aged 66); Glenelg, Inverness-shire, Scotland
- Occupations: Wildlife conservationist; television presenter
- Known for: Animal Magic

Terence Paul Nutkins (12 August 1946 – 6 September 2012) was an English naturalist. He appeared in the UK children's programmes Animal Magic, The Really Wild Show, Brilliant Creatures and Growing Up Wild.

== Early life ==
Nutkins was born in 1946 in Marylebone, London, and spent most of his childhood there. His parents' house overlooked Marylebone station. He skipped school to spend time with the elephants at London Zoo. At the age of 12, Nutkins went to work in the West Highlands of Scotland, the naturalist Gavin Maxwell having written to London Zoo requesting help from two young assistants to look after otters that he was keeping as pets and studying at his remote home at Sandaig near Glenelg. Nutkins was initially hired for a summer placement, but did not return home and with the permission of his parents he spent several years working and living with Maxwell.

Maxwell became Nutkins' legal guardian, and in a BBC Radio 4 documentary Nutkins described living with Maxwell as a "peculiar existence, in virtual isolation, with a man who was as charming as he was difficult, and whose depression led to severe mood swings". Maxwell wrote several books during Nutkins' time there, including the hugely successful Ring of Bright Water in 1960.

At the age of 15, Nutkins lost part of two fingers to one of the otters, named Edal. In the "United Kingdom" episode of the BBC's programme Deadly 60, Nutkins stated that the otter became aggressive in response to the scent on a jumper that he had been given by a woman that Edal had already attacked and bitten. Edal tore at Nutkins' boot, then attacked his right hand as he reached down, severing the end of his middle finger. As he attempted to control the otter with his other hand, the otter bit his other middle finger and twisted away, severing the end of the other finger.

Nutkins revisited the site of the cottage he shared with Maxwell on the BBC's Countryfile programme in 2010.

== Career ==
In the 1980s, Nutkins was co-presenter of the BBC children's television series Animal Magic with Johnny Morris, whom he describes as his second mentor after Maxwell. The show featured various animals including memorable segments with a sea lion named Gemini that Nutkins had hand-reared from infancy. Animal Magic's run ended in 1983 and a year later Nutkins was asked to put together a new animal series, which resulted in The Really Wild Show which he presented from 1986 to 1993. In 1999, he inherited a large portion of Johnny Morris's estate.

Nutkins was part of a consortium which bought and later sold Fort Augustus Abbey on the shores of Loch Ness.

In 2004, he appeared on Living TV's reality television show I'm Famous and Frightened!. In April 2009, Nutkins co-presented and narrated My Life as an Animal, a BBC Three programme where young professionals and media personalities lived life as animals for four days, sharing living areas, food and sleeping with several farm and zoo animals. Nutkins made an appearance on the BBC's Winterwatch programme (a spin off from Springwatch) talking about how otters had survived the harsh weather in January 2012.

Nutkins was a beekeeper and a member of the British Beekeepers' Association. A stone carving of Nutkins was unveiled at the Royal Horticultural Society Show in Tatton Park in 2010.

== Personal life and death ==
Nutkins was married. He had eight children.

Nutkins died on 6 September 2012, at the age of 66. He had been receiving treatment for nine months for acute leukaemia. He died at his home in Glenelg, Scotland.

== Bibliography ==
- Pets (Factfinders) (with Marshall Corwin) BBC Books (1989) ISBN 0-563-34524-1

== Audio book narration ==
- The Really Wild Animal Tape Listen for Pleasure (1995) ISBN 1-85848-339-5
- Animal Magic: A Jungle Story Listen for Pleasure, (1997) ISBN 1-85848-483-9
