= Keith Shackleton =

British painter

Keith Hope Shackleton MBE (16 January 1923 – 17 April 2015) was a British painter who concentrated on landscape views and animals. He has also produced limited edition prints. He was a friend of the conservationist and fellow painter Peter Scott, with whom he travelled to Antarctica. Like Scott, he went to Oundle School. He was also a presenter on the BBC children's television programme Animal Magic and of the Children's ITV series Animals in Action, produced by Anglia Television using footage from its Survival series.

A retrospective exhibition of his "Polar Art", depicting creatures and scenery from both the Arctic and Antarctic was open at the Scott Polar Research Institute in May and June 2007.

Shackleton was appointed Member of the Order of the British Empire (MBE) in the 2012 Birthday Honours for services to the conservation of wildlife.

Shackleton married Jacqueline Tate in 1951. They had two sons and a daughter.

He died peacefully on 17 April 2015.
