= Nicholas Jones (artist) =

British artist

Nicholas (Nick) Jones is a British artist who paints abstract landscapes. He was trained at Bristol Polytechnic and initially worked exclusively in Stained glass. He now works in the medium of Acrylic on canvas, with work has focused on landscapes, partially those in the Arctic after a trip conducted as Artist in Residence with the Friends of the Scott Polar Research Institute. Nick Jones is represented by the Crane Kalman Gallery, London.

Much of his work is focused on landscapes in and around the coast. Speaking to Coast (magazine), Jones said "Over my journey as a painter, I have repeatedly found myself seeking to evoke the lure of the coast, where earth, water and air meet. time spend on the coast helps me connect with life". A large proportion of his work depicts the arctic, after Jone's trip to Greenland. Speaking to The Marshwood Vale upon opening of his 2021 show at Staters Yard Gallery, west bay, Jone's said "It is my hope that these paintings may speak of the beauty and fragility of the Arctic but also, in some small way, open up space and light for others, just as my time in the arctic did for me".

Jone's work also reflects on the changing landscape due to climate change. In 2022, Jone's 'Dawn Light, Cape Mercy, Baffin Island' (2019) Jones' was announced as winner in the 'Earth's Wild Beauty' category of the Shepherd Wildlife Foundation Wildlife Artist of the Year 2022 award The judge, Melanie Shepherd, described 'Dawn Light, Cape Mercy, Baffin Island' as "A supremely powerful portrayal of how the ice floes are melting due to climate change. The stunning simplicity of his work says it all – it's a simple, stark message to the world." Speaking to Geographical (Magazine of the Royal Geographical Society) in 2021, Jones said 'At this point in history, when our planet is heating at an unprecedented rate, the image of an iceberg holds a haunting poignancy.' Jones subsequently won the Cherry Kearton Medal and Award for work around the arctic and climate change.

== Honours and awards ==
Jones has won several awards over his career:

- 2018 - Friends of the Scott Polar Research Institute Arctic Artist in Residence.
- 2022 - Royal Geographical Society Cherry Kearton Medal and Award.
- 2022 - David Shepherd Wildlife Artist of the Year Award in 'Earth's Wild Beauty' Category.
