= Alan Root =

British documentary film maker (1937–2017)

At the WTTC Summit in 2012

Alan Root (12 May 1937, London – 26 August 2017) was a British-born filmmaker who worked on nature documentary series such as Survival.

Until 1981 he was married to Joan Root, who was a Kenyan-born conservationist, murdered at Lake Naivasha in 2006. The couple had produced National Geographic articles together from 1963 to 1971 on animals, Galapagos Islands, and mainly African wildlife. Notable films include: The Year of the Wildebeest (1974), Safari by Balloon (1975), Mysterious Castles of Clay (1978), Two in the Bush (1980) and A Season in the Sun (1983).

Alan Root's strong narrative style characterised much of Survival’s output and helped shape a sophisticated genre known as Blue Chip films. The Year of the Wildebeest was the epic story of the thundering migration of wildebeest herds across the plains of the Serengeti. Mysterious Castles of Clay, by contrast, showed wildlife in intricate detail in and around termite mounds, revealing the insects' highly organised society and skills of construction. It received a nomination for an Academy Award.

The Roots used a hot-air balloon to film sequences for the wildebeest film, and in Safari by Balloon made the first hot-air balloon flight over Mount Kilimanjaro. Two in the Bush (re-titled Lights, Action, Africa! in the USA) included "Mysterious Castles Clay" footage of a spitting cobra directing its venom at Joan's face positioned just a few feet from the snake while Alan filmed. A Season in the Sun, an account of wildlife's struggle to survive the heat and drought of the dry season, won an Emmy and a Peabody Award after it was aired by PBS in 1987.

Alan and Joan Root were responsible for many of Survival's most successful films for almost 20 years from the mid-1960s. After their partnership ended, Alan Root continued his association with Survival as a cinematographer, producing his own films and guiding the early African work of camera team Mark Deeble and Victoria Stone, while latterly also acting as adviser to the series.

== Death ==
In March 2017, Root was diagnosed with glioblastoma. He died on 26 August 2017, aged 80, in Nanyuki, Kenya, following a holiday with his wife, Fran Michelmore, and two sons to Alaska, US.
