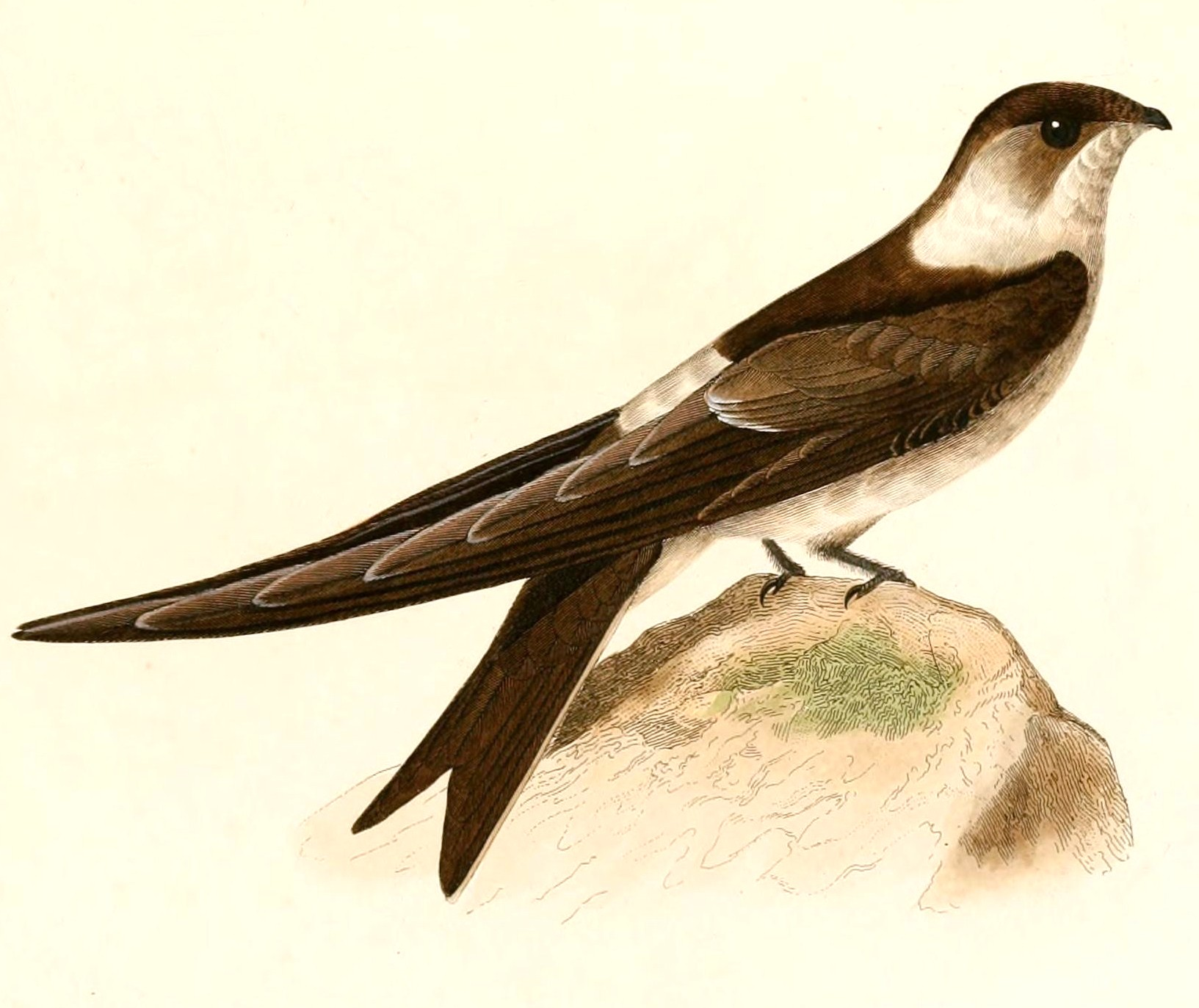

Conservation status
- Least Concern (IUCN 3.1)

Scientific classification
- Kingdom: Animalia
- Phylum: Chordata
- Class: Aves
- Order: Apodiformes
- Family: Apodidae
- Genus: Aeronautes
- Species: A. andecolus

Binomial name
- Aeronautes andecolus (d'Orbigny & Lafresnaye, 1837)
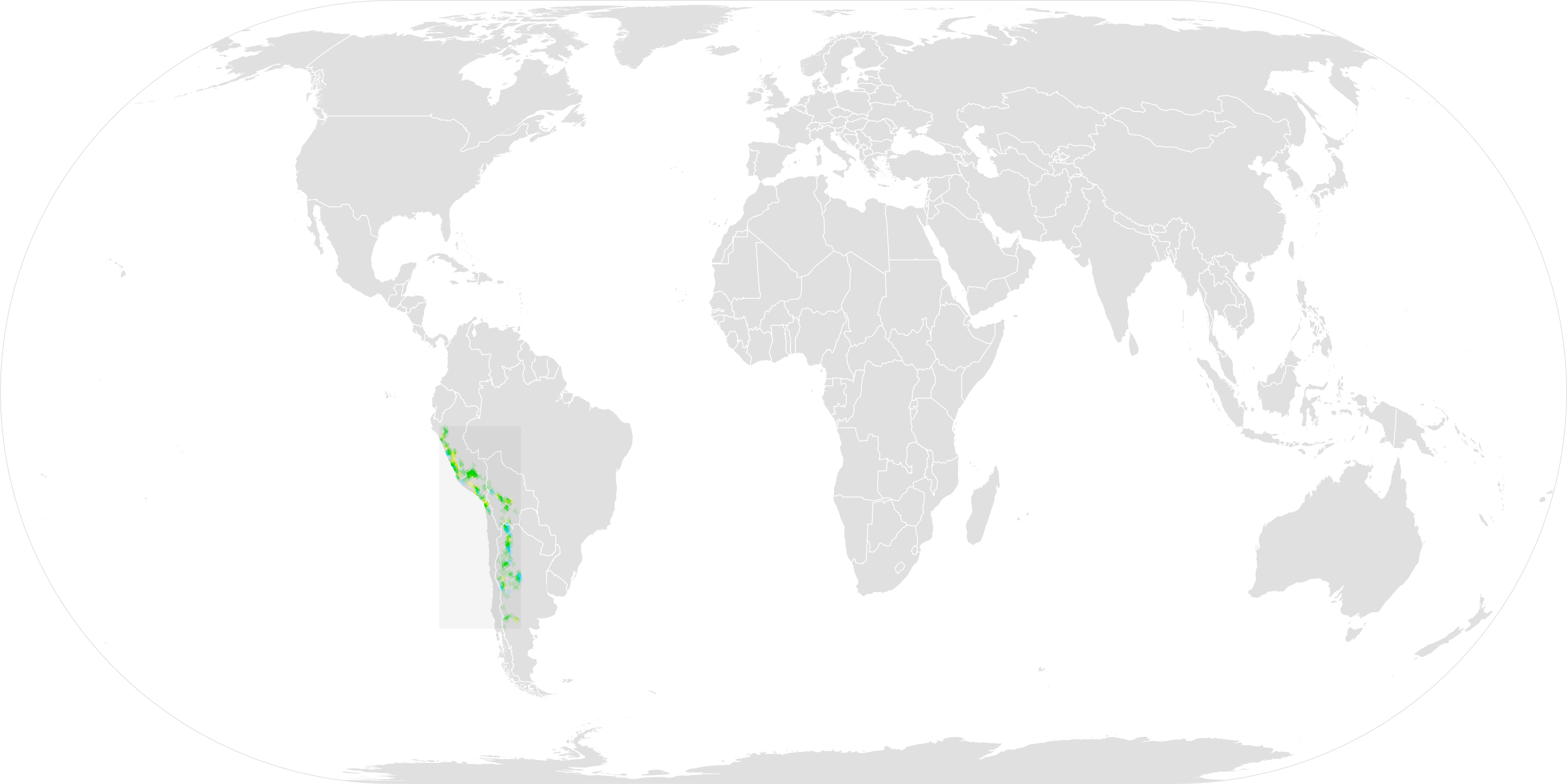
- Global range Year-Round Range Summer Range Winter Range

Synonyms
- Micropus andecolus; Apus andecolus

= Andean swift =

Species of bird

The Andean swift (Aeronautes andecolus) is a species of bird in subfamily Apodinae of the swift family Apodidae. It is found in Argentina, Bolivia, Chile, and Peru.

== Taxonomy and systematics ==
The Andean swift was at one time placed in genus Micropus which was later merged into Aeronautes, and also in genus Apus from which it was split. Three subspecies are recognized, the nominate A. a. andecolus, A. a. parvulus, and A. a. peruvianus.

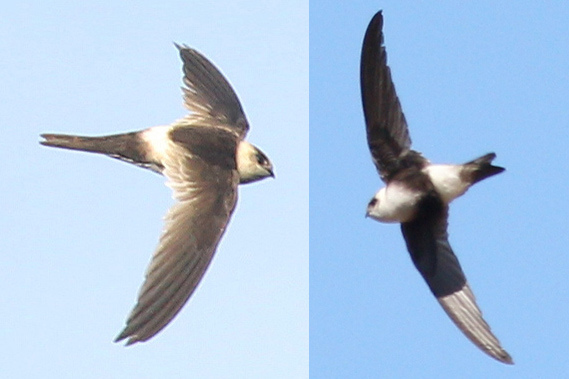
Andean swift flying

== Description ==
The Andean swift is about 14 cm (5.5 in) long. It has sharply pointed wings and a long deeply forked tail. The sexes are alike. Adults of the nominate subspecies have mostly black upperparts with a white collar and band on the rump. Their face and underparts are mostly white to off-white with mottled buff on the flanks and vent. Subspecies A. a. parvulus is smaller than the nominate and the borders between black and white areas are very sharply defined. A. a. peruvianus is also smaller than the nominate. Its tail is shorter and less deeply forked, its white plumage is purer, and it has darker undertail coverts.

== Distribution and habitat ==
Subspecies A. a. parvulus of the Andean swift is the northernmost; it is found on the western slope of the Andes from Peru's Cajamarca Department south into far northern Chile's Tarapacá Region. The nominate A. a. andecolus is found from central Bolivia south to Río Negro Province in west central Argentina. A. a. peruvianus is restricted to the east slope of the Andes in southeastern Peru.

The Andean swift mostly inhabits semi-arid montane scrub landscapes though it is also found in both drier and more humid areas. It is occasionally seen over forested slopes. In elevation it mostly ranges between 2,500 and 3,550 m (8,200 and 11,600 ft) in Peru and Bolivia and between 2,000 and 2,500 m (6,600 and 8,200 ft) in Argentina. It has been recorded above 4,100 m (13,500 ft) in Peru.

== Behavior ==
=== Movement ===
The Andean swift is a year-round resident throughout its range, though it may temporarily move to lower elevations to avoid snowstorms.

=== Feeding ===
Like all swifts, the Andean is an aerial insectivore, but no details of its diet are known. It often forages in flocks with wintering chimney swifts (Chaetura pelagica).

=== Breeding ===
Little is known about the Andean swift's breeding biology. It has been documented nesting in holes in steep rock faces, including behind waterfalls, but the nest itself has not been described.

=== Vocalization ===
The Andean swift's most common vocalization is "a buzzy, grating 'tzee-tz-tz-trrr...tzee-tz-tz-tzee...'." It also makes "a series of single notes 'tzree..tzree..tzree...'."

== Status ==
The IUCN has assessed the Andean swift as being of Least Concern. It has a large range, and though its population size is not known it is believed to be stable. No immediate threats have been identified. It is generally considered common, though uncommon in northern Chile and "local and irregular" in parts of Argentina.
