= Mount Skittle =

Mountain in South Georgia

- Location within South America

Highest point
- Elevation: 480 m (1,570 ft)

Naming
- Etymology: From German "Kegel-Berg"

Mount Skittle (54°24′S 36°11′W) is a prominent rocky mountain, 480 m, forming the north limit of Saint Andrews Bay on the north coast of South Georgia. The name "Kegel-Berg" (Skittle Mountain) was given for this feature by the German group of the International Polar Year Investigations, 1882–83. During the SGS, 1951–52, the mountain was identified and located. An English form of the name, Mount Skittle, was recommended by the United Kingdom Antarctic Place-Names Committee (UK-APC) in 1954.
