= Built for the Kill =

- Genre: Nature documentary
- Narrated by: Mathew Morgan
- No. of seasons: 5
- No. of episodes: 31

Production
- Running time: 48 minutes (each episode)

Original release
- Network: National Geographic Channel
- Release: November 24, 2001 – 2004

Built for the Kill is a nature series made by Granada Wild for the National Geographic Channel. It was produced from 2001 to 2004, with a total of 31 episodes. Each episode runs for approximately 48 minutes including the credits and opening titles.

== Format ==
Episodes of Built For The Kill cover a topic or habitat for predatory animals, such as "Coral Reef" or "Packs". If the episode is the name of a Habitat (Coral Reef), the episode will feature predators from that environment. If the episode's name is something like "Jaws" or "Packs", it will feature predators who utilize the name of the episode. Built For The Kill uses a graphical approach to catch the audiences attention, often showing inner workings of the predatory animals (e.g. showing a snake's "Jacobson Organ" inside its mouth) by using diagrams. Some effects seen are used to show the audience what they can't really see, but is there (such as the electricity coming from an Electric Ray or the sound waves used in Echo Location). This graphical approach to nature is meant to make the documentary more interesting to watch.

Built for the Kill's classic opening was a montage of creatures featured in the first 7 episodes (Desert, Coral Reef, Rainforest, Grassland, Miniature, Swamp and Ocean) with a catchy theme song. This opening was changed further into the series to one that shows the National Geographic logo in various parts. The theme song stayed the same however.

In 2011 National Geographic Channel resurrect the show with four new episodes. However, the four episodes were presented with a slightly different style than the original. The following four episodes are (lion, great white shark, polar bear, and crocodile) and is expected to be continued.

== Episodes ==
- 01. Desert
- 02. Coral Reef
- 03. Rainforest
- 04. Grassland
- 05. Miniature
- 06. Swamp
- 07. Ocean
- 08. Cold
- 09. Night
- 10. Island
- 11. Forest
- 12. Hidden
- 13. Ambush
- 14. River
- 15. Birds Of Prey
- 16. Jaws
- 17. Packs
- 18. Shark
- 19. Cat
- 20. Killer Canines
- 21. Snake
- 22. Speed
- 23. Claws
- 24. Poison
- 25. Macro Gladiators
- 26. Stealth Killers
- 27. Unlikely Carnivores
- 28. Chase
- 29. Undersea Deception
- 30. Cold Blooded
- 31. Flying Insects

== Home releases ==
- (2005, Europe, 2 Discs)

01 Claws
02 Killer Canines
03 Jaws
04 Packs
05 Speed

- Collection 1 (2009, Australia, 4 Discs)

01 Desert
02 Coral Reef
03 Rainforest
04 Grassland
05 Miniature
06 Swamp
07 Ocean
08 Cold
09 Night
10 Island

- Collection 2 (2010, Australia, 4 Discs)

01 Forest
02 River
03 Hidden
04 Chase
05 Poison
06 Ambush
07 Birds of Prey
08 Cat
09 Shark
10 Snake

== Related National Geographic programs ==
- Dangerous Encounters
- Battle at Kruger
