= Cook Glacier (South Georgia) =

Glacier in Antarctica

- Location within South Georgia Island Location within Atlantic Ocean
- Location: South Georgia
- Coordinates: 54°27′S 36°11′W
- Thickness: unknown
- Terminus: St Andrews Bay
- Status: unknown

Cook Glacier (54°27′S 36°11′W) is a glacier which flows in a north-northeasterly direction to Saint Andrews Bay on the north coast of South Georgia. It was named by the German group of the International Polar Year Investigations based at nearby Moltke Harbour in 1882–83, for Captain James Cook.

== See also ==
- List of glaciers in the Antarctic
- Glaciology
