= St Andrews Bay, South Georgia =

Bay in South Georgia

Saint Andrews Bay
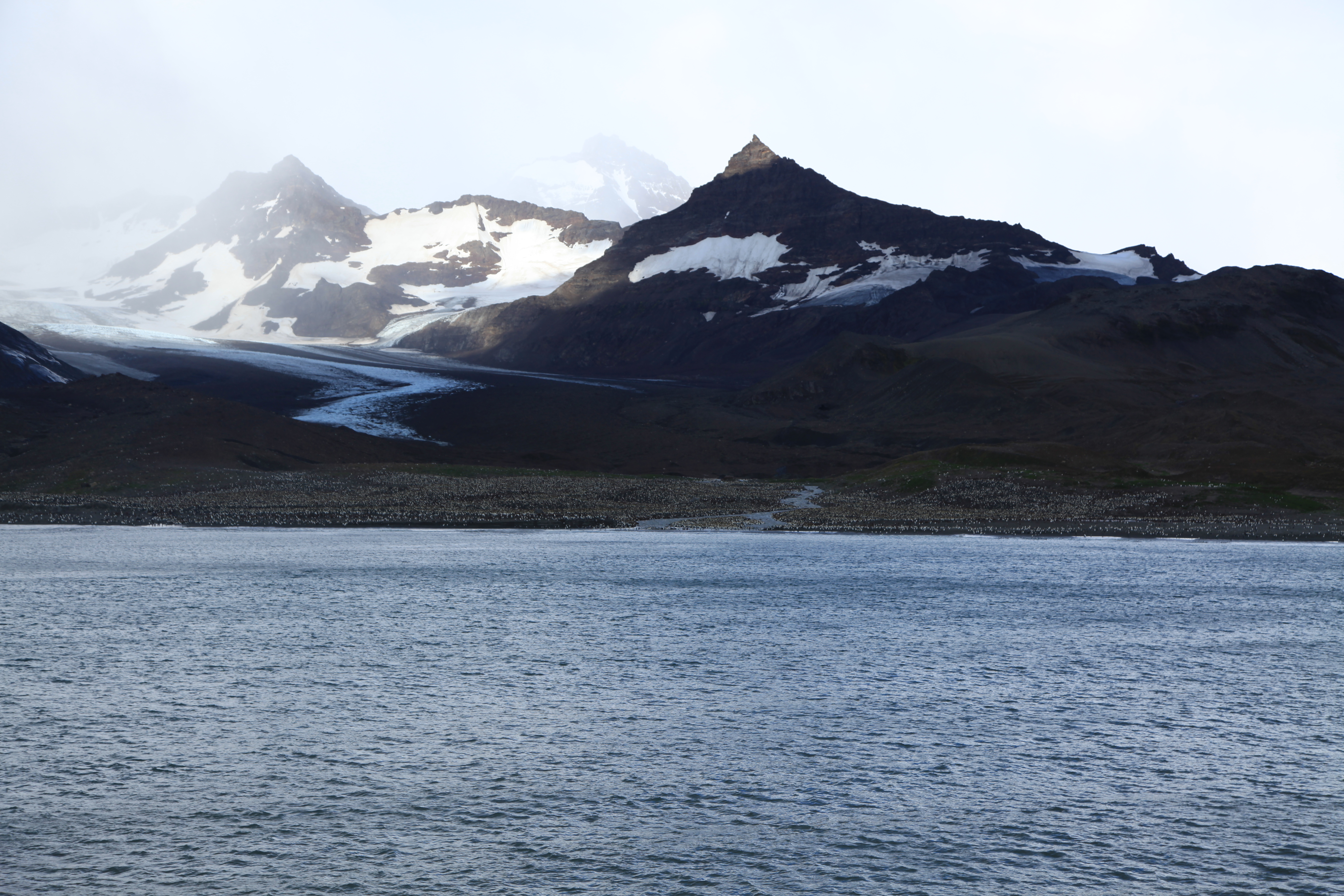
- St Andrews Bay with the penguin colony
- Interactive map of Saint Andrews Bay
- Location: North coast of South Georgia
- Coordinates: 54°26′S 36°11′W
- Type: Bight
- Ocean/sea sources: South Atlantic Ocean
- Max. width: 2 m (6 ft 7 in)

Saint Andrews Bay is a bight 2 miles (3.2 km) wide, indenting the north coast of South Georgia immediately south of Mount Skittle. Probably first sighted by the British expedition under Cook which explored the north coast of South Georgia in 1775. The name dates back to at least 1920 and is now well established. On charts where abbreviations are used, the name may be abbreviated to St. Andrews Bay.

King penguins form huge breeding colonies, and the one at St Andrews Bay has over 150,000 birds and is (2021) probably the largest in the world. Because of the long breeding cycle, colonies are continuously occupied.

Cook Glacier, which once terminated in the bay, has retreated from the current beach since the 1970s, leaving a lake and gravel beach in its wake. Heaney Glacier and Buxton Glacier also terminate inland from the bay.
