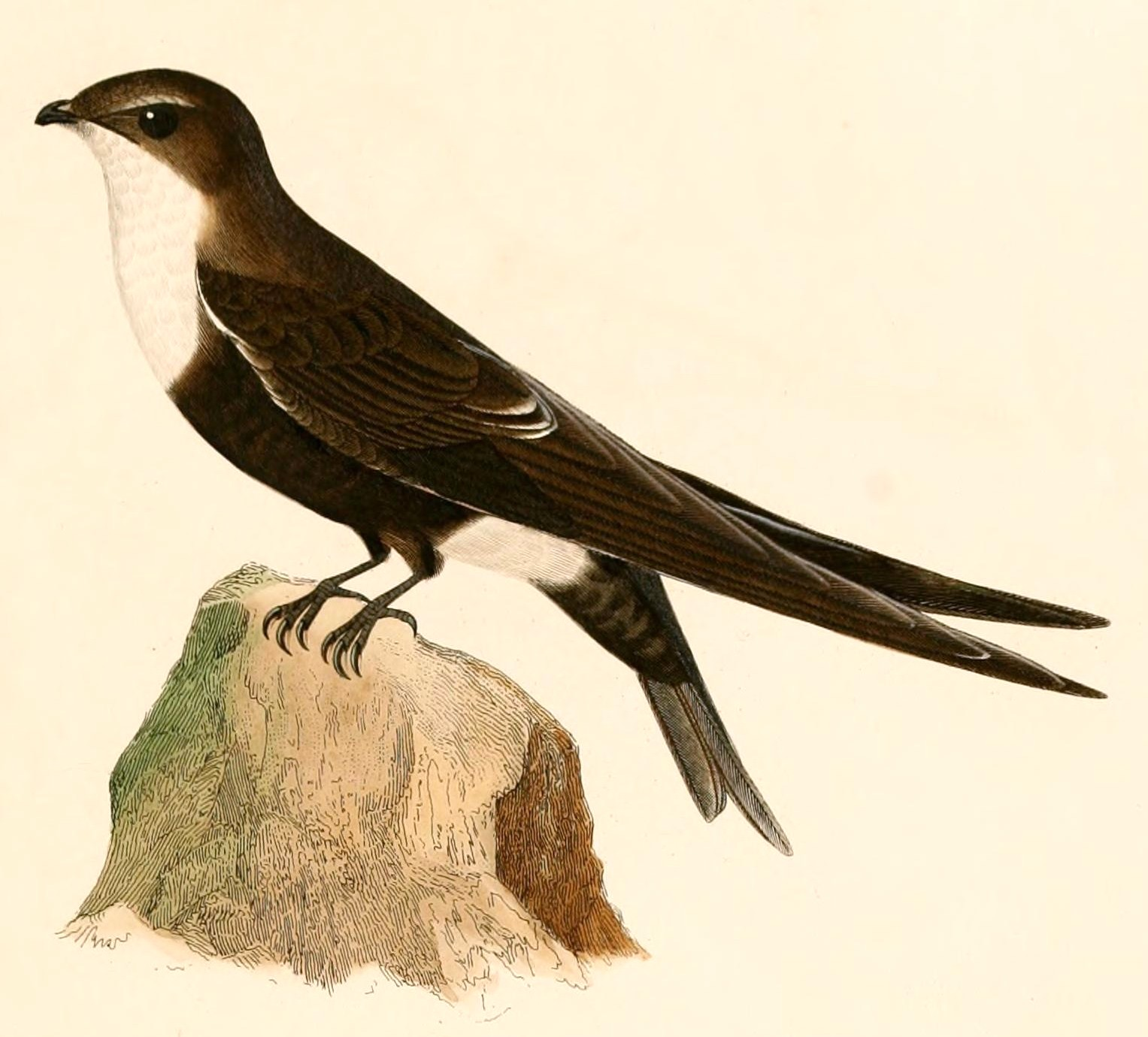

Conservation status
- Least Concern (IUCN 3.1)

Scientific classification
- Kingdom: Animalia
- Phylum: Chordata
- Class: Aves
- Order: Apodiformes
- Family: Apodidae
- Genus: Aeronautes
- Species: A. montivagus

Binomial name
- Aeronautes montivagus (d'Orbigny & Lafresnaye, 1837)

Synonyms
- Micropus montivagus

Audio

= White-tipped swift =

Species of bird

The white-tipped swift (Aeronautes montivagus) is a species of bird in the subfamily Apodinae of the family Apodidae. It is found in Argentina, Bolivia, Brazil, Colombia, Ecuador, French Guiana, Peru, Suriname, Venezuela, and possibly Guyana.

== Taxonomy and systematics ==
The white-tipped swift was at one time placed in genus Micropus which was later merged into Aeronautes. It has two subspecies, the nominate A. m. montivagus and A. m. tatei.

== Description ==
The white-tipped swift is 12 to 13 cm (4.7 to 5.1 in) long and weighs 17 to 33 g (0.60 to 1.2 oz). It has slim pointed wings and a long slightly notched tail. Adult males of the nominate subspecies are blackish brown on the crown and around the eye; most of the rest of the face is gray brown. Their upperparts are the same blackish brown as the crown. Their tail is black-brown with wide white tips to the feathers. Their wings are blackish brown with white edges on some feathers. Their throat, sides of the neck, and the upper breast are white. The rest of their underparts are a slightly lighter blackish brown than the upperparts, with white patches around the legs. Adult females are browner than males with sometimes a paler lower back and rump. The white of the throat is duller and the white tips of the tail reduced or absent. Juveniles are similar to adults with the addition of pale fringes to body feathers. Subspecies A. m. tatei is similar to the nominate, but their upperparts are a very glossy blue black.

== Distribution and habitat ==
The nominate subspecies of white-tipped swift is found in the Venezuelan Coastal Range and separately in the Andes from extreme western Venezuela south through Colombia, Ecuador, Peru, and Bolivia into northern Argentina. A. m. tatei is found in the tepui region along the border between southern Venezuela and northwestern Brazil. Sight records in Guyana and documented records in Suriname and French Guiana are probably of this subspecies.

The species is mostly seen over montane evergreen forest but also occurs in drier intermontane valleys in Ecuador and northern Peru. Its elevational limits vary geographically. It occurs between about 500 and 1,900 m (1,600 and 6,200 ft) in the tepui region, 800 and 2,600 m (2,600 and 8,500 ft) in coastal and Andean Venezuela, in Ecuador from 600 to 3,200 m (2,000 to 10,500 ft) but mostly between 1,500 and 2,000 m (4,900 and 6,600 ft), usually between 1,200 and 2,400 m (3,900 and 7,900 ft) in Peru, and usually between 500 and 2,600 m (1,600 and 8,500 ft) in Bolivia.

== Behavior ==
=== Movement ===
The white-tipped swift is generally considered to be resident throughout its range, but it "can disappear from some sites for months at a time".

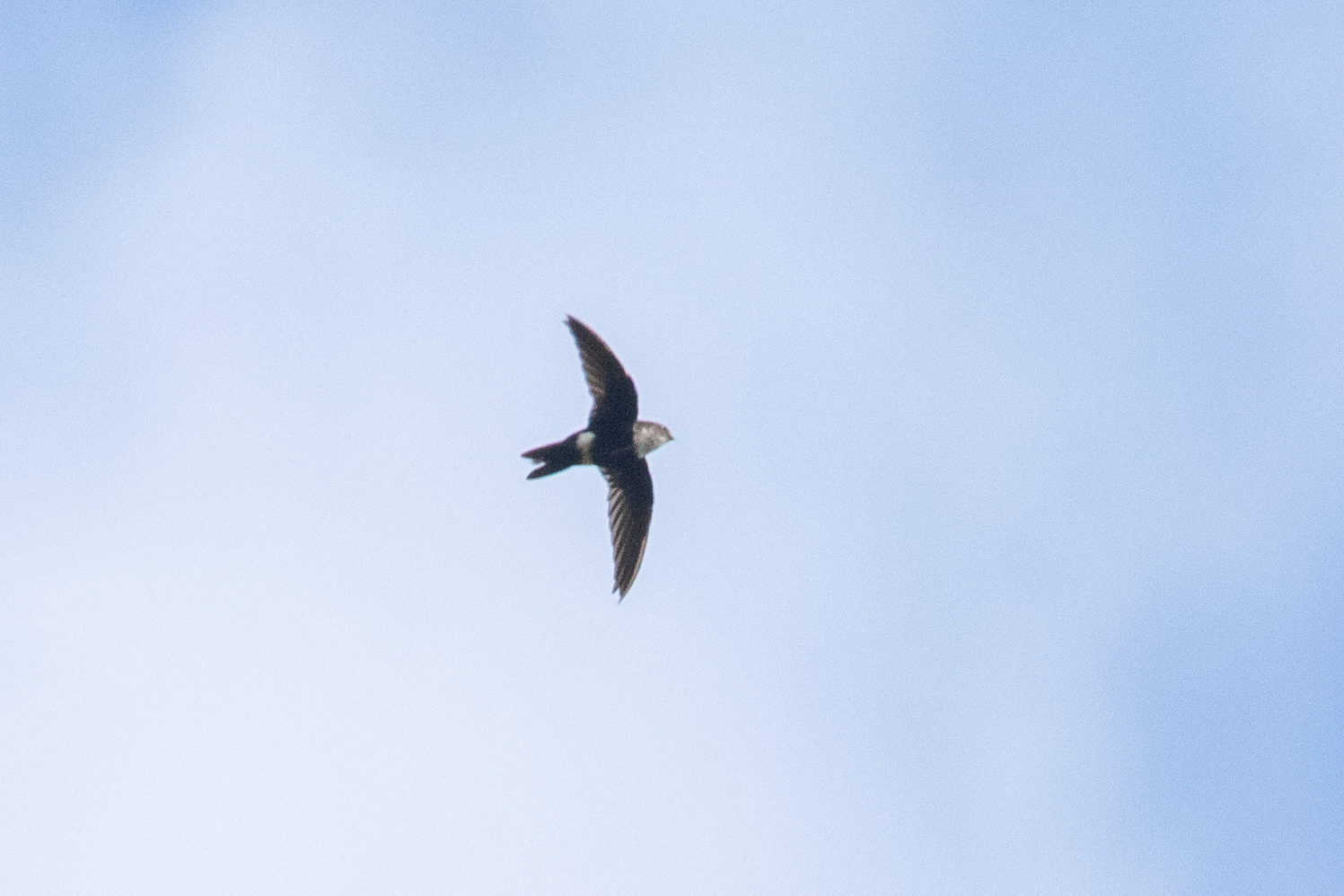
Flying

=== Feeding ===
Like all swifts, the white-tipped is an aerial insectivore. Details of its diet are lacking but it is known to feed on flying ants, beetles, and moths. It often feeds with other species of swift, but also in flocks of only its kind; flocks may number up to 50 birds. It tends to forage low over forest but in canyons it stays at ridge-top altitude.

=== Breeding ===
The white-tipped swift's breeding season in Venezuela appears to be from April to July but has not been determined elsewhere. It breeds in colonies, placing its nest in crevices of cliffs or on the side of buildings. The nest itself has not been described, but is probably an open cup made of fibers and feathers like those of others of its genus.

=== Vocalization ===
The white-tipped swift's flight calls has been described in many ways including a "distinctive, rachetlike, buzzing call, j-j-j-j-j-j 'j'j'j'j'J'J'J'J'j'j'j'j'j'j-j-j-j" and "a ringing, grating chatter: bzz-zz'zzz'zzz'zeee'tur'tur".

== Conservation status ==
The IUCN has assessed the white-tipped swift as being of Least Concern. It has a very large range, and though its population size is not known it is believed to be stable. No immediate threats have been identified. It is considered "fairly common but patchily distributed".
