= Aubrey Buxton, Baron Buxton of Alsa =

British politician and television executive (1918–2009)

The Right Honourable The Lord Buxton of Alsa KCVO MC DL

Member of the House of Lords
- Lord Temporal
- Life peerage 11 May 1978 – 1 September 2009

Personal details
- Born: 15 July 1918
- Died: 1 September 2009 (aged 91)

Major Aubrey Leland Oakes Buxton, Baron Buxton of Alsa KCVO MC DL (15 July 1918 – 1 September 2009) was a British soldier, politician, television executive, and writer.

== Biography ==
=== Early life ===
Buxton was born on 15 July 1918 in Oxford to Ada Mary Oakes and Leland William Wilberforce Buxton, who was then a captain in the British Army intelligence serving in Cairo. His paternal grandparents were Sir Fowell Buxton, 3rd Baronet, Governor of South Australia, and Lady Victoria Noel, daughter of the 1st Earl of Gainsborough. His uncles were Lord Noel Buxton, Charles Buxton, M.P., and Harold Buxton, Bishop of Gibraltar. He was the great-great-grandson of the anti-slavery campaigner Sir Thomas Buxton. He was educated at Ampleforth College in Yorkshire and graduated from Trinity College, Cambridge. He served in the Royal Artillery in the Second World War and was decorated with the Military Cross in 1943.

=== Career ===
From 1958 to 1988, he was a Director of Anglia Television. He was best known for creating the nature documentary series Survival, which ran for four decades.

=== Philanthropy ===
In 1961, he was one of the co-founders of the World Wildlife Fund. As well as the WWF, he was involved with the Natural History Museum, the Wildfowl and Wetlands Trust and the London Zoological Society.

In 1976, he and Lady Buxton donated a 10-hectare estate near Elsenham to the Essex Wildlife Trust, and it is named the Aubrey Buxton Nature Reserve.

In 1964, he was Extra Equerry to Prince Philip, Duke of Edinburgh and in 1972 High Sheriff of Essex. He became Deputy Lieutenant of Essex in 1975 and held this office until 1985.

=== Peerage ===
On 11 May 1978, he was created a life peer as Baron Buxton of Alsa, of Stiffkey in the County of Norfolk. In 1996, Buxton, was invested as a Knight Commander of the Royal Victorian Order (KCVO).

== Personal life ==
He was married twice: firstly to Pamela Mary "Maria" Birkin, daughter of Sir Henry Birkin, 3rd Baronet, on 14 November 1946; and secondly (having been widowed in 1983) to Kathleen Peterson, an American writer on 16 July 1988. His first marriage produced six children, one of whom, Cindy, is a noted filmmaker.

== Death ==
He died on 1 September 2009, aged 91, from undisclosed causes.

Coat of arms of Aubrey Buxton, Baron Buxton of Alsa
Crest A stag's head couped Gules attired Or gorged with a collar of the last pendent therefrom an escutcheon Argent charged with a negro's head couped at the shoulders in profile Proper. Escutcheon Argent a lion rampant the tail elevated and turned over the head between two mullets in fess Sable. Supporters Dexter a crowned crane (Balearica Pavonina) sinister a flamingo Proper. Motto Do With Thy Might

== See also ==
- Survival (TV series)

== Bibliography ==
- The Birds of Arakan (1946)
- The King in his Country (1955)
- The London Scene (1961)

Cultural offices
Preceded by Neil Sutherland	President of the Royal Television Society; 1973–1977	Succeeded by Prince Edward, Duke of Kent
Honorary titles
Preceded by Allan James Vincent Arthur	High Sheriff of Essex; 1972–1973	Succeeded by Gerald Colville Seymour Curtis
