= Allan Arthur (civil servant) =

British civil servant

Alan James Vincent Arthur MBE DL (16 September 1915 – 22 May 1998) was High Sheriff of Essex from 1971 to 1972. The son of Colonel Sir Charles Arthur,MC VD, he was educated at Rugby School and Magdalene College, Cambridge, where he was on the swimming and water polo teams. He was with the Indian Civil Service from 1938 to 1947; and the Sudan Political Service from 1948 to 1954. Returning to Essex he was then a sugar broker and commodity broker. He was Mayor of Chelmsford from 1977 to 1978. From 1978 to 1985 he was one of Essex's Deputy Lieutenants.
