= UConn Lumpy =

American non-rigid airship

Lumpy
- The Lumpy airship at the UConn Storrs campus, 1975

General information
- Type: Airship
- National origin: United States of America
- Manufacturer: University of Connecticut
- Status: retired
- Number built: 1

History
- First flight: 1975

The UConn Lumpy was a blimp designed, built, and flown by students at the University of Connecticut in 1975.

== Design and development ==
The airship was built by five University of Connecticut engineering students as part of their Engineering Design Project class at the university, with Associate Professor Kurt Marshke acting as their faculty advisor. As part of the process, the students built a 9.2 ft (2.8 m) proof-of-concept model, to vet the design and the control mechanisms.

The gondola was made from aluminum tubing, with the pilot located near the front and the engine sited towards the rear. The envelope was sewn together using green surplus government issue parachutes, and contained three 25 ft (7.6 m) diameter weather balloons filled with helium. The ill-fitting appearance of the envelope led to the craft being named Lumpy. The airship was powered by a 15 hp (11 kW) snowmobile engine, that had been salvaged from an earlier student project. The craft was fitted with an elevator, but not a rudder.

== Operational history ==
The Lumpy flew on Saturday, 24 May 1975 at the university's Storrs campus' soccer field. To abide by FAA regulations, a 500 ft (150 m) tether was attached to the airship. Student Robert S. Meshako acted as pilot for the initial trials, with the other students later having turns at the controls. The airship reached a maximum altitude of 100 ft (30 m).

== Specifications ==
Data from The Hartford Courant & Connecticut Daily Campus

General characteristics

- Crew: 1
- Length: 16 m (51 ft)
- Diameter: 7.6 m (25 ft)
- Volume: 200 m^{3} (7,000 cu ft) gross
- Empty weight: 204 kg (450 lb)

Performance

- Maximum speed: 16 km/h (10 mph, 8.7 kn)
