= The London Scene =

The London Scene is the name given to a series of six essays that Virginia Woolf wrote for Good Housekeeping magazine in 1931 and 1932. The title was not chosen by Woolf but comes from the 1975 republication of five of the essays. Originally the essays were referred to as 'Six Articles on London Life'.

== Essays ==
=== The Docks of London ===
This was the first of the essays published in the series that Woolf wrote for Good Housekeeping and was published in the December 1931 issue of the magazine (volume 20, issue 4). In the essay, Woolf describes visiting the Port of London, at the time the World's largest port. The essay imagines a trip along the River Thames and describes the sites of industry and trade that would be seen along the way, as well as the environmental consequences. The essay was based on Woolf's trip to the port earlier in 1931, where she accompanied the Persian ambassador.

=== The Oxford Street Tide ===
This second essay was published in the January 1932 issue of Good Housekeeping (volume 20, issue 5). Here, the narrator of the essay describes the busy streets and Department Stores of Oxford Street. Woolf emphasises the ephemerality of modernity and the rise of consumerism, describing its allure and charm but also its potential vacuity.

=== Great Men's Houses ===
This essay was published in the March 1932 issue of Good Housekeeping (volume 21, issue 1). In it, Woolf describes visiting the houses of Thomas and Jane Welsh Carlyle at 5 Cheyne Row and the house of John Keats in Hampstead. The essay finishes with a description of looking down at London from the top of Hampstead Heath.

=== Abbeys and Cathedrals ===
This essay was published in the May 1932 issue of Good Housekeeping (volume 21, issue 3). Woolf describes her experience of visiting St Paul's Cathedral, Westminster Abbey and St Clement Danes.

=== "This Is The House of Commons" ===
This essay was published in the October 1932 issue of Good Housekeeping (volume 21, issue 9). Here, Woolf describes a trip to the House of Commons inside the Palace of Westminster. Comparing contemporary politicians, such as Ramsay MacDonald and Stanley Baldwin, to those of the eighteenth and nineteenth century, Woolf suggests that politics has become less about the personality of great leaders. "The days of single men and personal power are over," she writes. As Sonita Sarker writes, this is the only essay which has its title in quotation marks and suggests the voice of a tour guide or an awestruck sightseer.

=== Portrait of a Londoner ===
This essay was published in the December 1932 issue of Good Housekeeping (volume 21, issue 11). This essay differs from the others as it does not describe a public place within the capital, but the drawing room of a woman that Woolf describes as a "true Cockney", named Mrs Crowe. The short pen portrait begins with a short description of Mrs Crowe's modest home and goes on to outline the steady stream of guests she would welcome into her home. The essay concludes by describing how, now Mrs Crowe has died, London will never be the same again.

== Publication history ==
In 1975, the American publisher Frank Hallman, with permission from Angelica Garnett and Quentin Bell, republished the first five essays as a book, giving the collection its title, The London Scene. This edition was reprinted by Random House and the Hogarth Press in 1982. It is not known why 'Portrait of a Londoner' was not included in this edition. It has been suggested that Angelica and Quentin may have wished for it to be omitted, but this assertion has also been disputed.

In 2004, 'Portrait of a Londoner' was claimed to have been rediscovered and was reprinted in The Guardian newspaper. However, the essay had been included in the third edition of B. J. Kirkpatrick's A Bibliography of Virginia Woolf in 1980 and so its existence was public knowledge, although less well-known than the other essays.

A complete edition of The London Scene was published for the first time in 2004 by the publisher Snowbooks in their 'Signature Series'.

In 2013, The London Scene was again republished in full, this time by Daunt Books and with a short preface by Hermione Lee.
