= American Civil Defense Association =

American nonprofit organization

The American Civil Defense Association
- Founded: 1962
- Purpose: Civil defense, Emergency preparedness
- Location: Sandy, Utah, US
- Region served: United States
- Product: METTAG Medical Emergency Triage Tags, 72 Hour Kits, Books, CERT Supplies, Food Storage Containers, Water Purification, Water Storage
- Key people: Jay Whimpey, P.E., President Roseanne Hassett, Executive Director
- Revenue: $137,951 (2018)
- Website: tacda.org

The American Civil Defense Association (TACDA) is a member-supported, 501(c)(3) nonprofit, civil defense-focused organization founded in 1962. Its primary focus is to educate its membership on emergencies, both man-made and natural disasters through various resources. The organization operates the free TACDA Academy and prints a periodical called Journal of Civil Defense. TACDA also sells emergency supplies, such as dosimeters, water purification equipment, emergency rations, CERT equipment, and Mettag Triage Tags.

In a letter dated October 19, 1988, then sitting president Ronald Reagan praised the work of TACDA.
