= State Council of Civil Defense =

In the history of emergency management, the State Council of Civil Defense was created by a 1951 federal Act creating in each US state a State Council of Civil Defense. Identifiably printed on a placard in the film "Alert Today, Alive Tomorrow", the State council of Civil Defense was an iteration of United States Civil Defense following World War II.

The council was involved in the development of AT&T's "Bell and Lights" Air Raid Warning System, which spanned Canada and the United States. The Air Raid Warning System, with the prominent letters YBRW, indicates threat/warning levels.
