= Civil defense =

Protection of citizens from disasters and military attack

The international distinctive sign of civil defense, defined by the rules of international humanitarian law and to be used as a protective sign

Civil defense or civil protection is an effort to protect the citizens of a state (generally non-combatants) from human-made and natural disasters. It uses the principles of emergency management: prevention, mitigation, preparation, response, or emergency evacuation and recovery. Programs of this sort were initially discussed at least as early as the 1920s and were implemented in some countries during the 1930s as the threat of war and aerial bombardment grew. Civil-defense structures became widespread after authorities recognised the threats posed by nuclear weapons.

Since the end of the Cold War, the focus of civil defense has largely shifted from responding to military attack to dealing with emergencies and disasters in general. The new concept is characterised by a number of terms, each of which has its own specific shade of meaning, such as crisis management, emergency management, emergency preparedness, contingency planning, civil contingency, civil aid and civil protection.

Some countries treat civil defense as a key part of defense in general. For example, total defence refers to the commitment of a wide range of national resources to defense, including the protection of all aspects of civilian life.

== History ==
=== Origins ===
==== United Kingdom ====
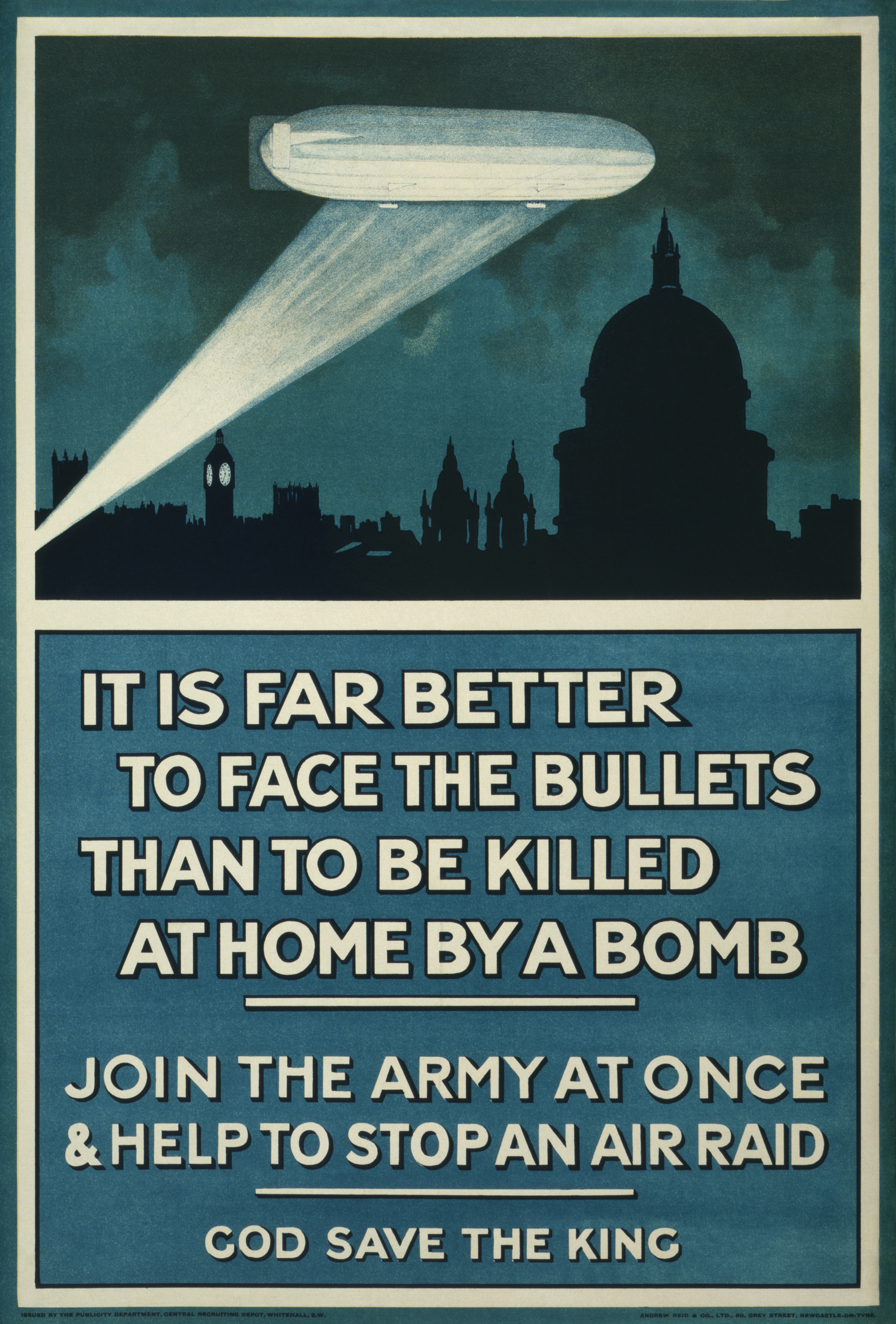
British First World War poster, bringing attention to the threat posed by aerial bombardment from German Zeppelins

The advent of civil defense was stimulated by the experience of the bombing of civilian areas during the First World War. The bombing of the United Kingdom began on 19 January 1915 when German zeppelins dropped bombs on the Great Yarmouth area, killing six people. German bombing operations of the First World War were surprisingly effective, especially after the Gotha bombers surpassed the zeppelins. The most devastating raids inflicted 121 casualties for each ton of bombs dropped; this figure was then used as a basis for predictions.

After the war, attention was turned toward civil defense in the event of war, and the Air Raid Precautions Committee (ARP) was established in 1924 to investigate ways for ensuring the protection of civilians from the danger of air-raids.

The Committee produced figures estimating that in London there would be 9,000 casualties in the first two days and then a continuing rate of 17,500 casualties a week. These rates were thought conservative. It was believed that there would be "total chaos and panic" and hysterical neurosis as the people of London would try to flee the city. To control the population harsh measures were proposed: bringing London under almost military control, and physically cordoning off the city with 120,000 troops to force people back to work. A different government department proposed setting up camps for refugees for a few days before sending them back to London.

A special government department, the Civil Defence Service, was established by the Home Office in 1935. Its remit included the pre-existing ARP as well as wardens, firemen (initially the Auxiliary Fire Service (AFS) and latterly the National Fire Service (NFS)), fire watchers, rescue, first aid post, stretcher party and industry. Over 1.9 million people served within the CD; nearly 2,400 died from enemy action.

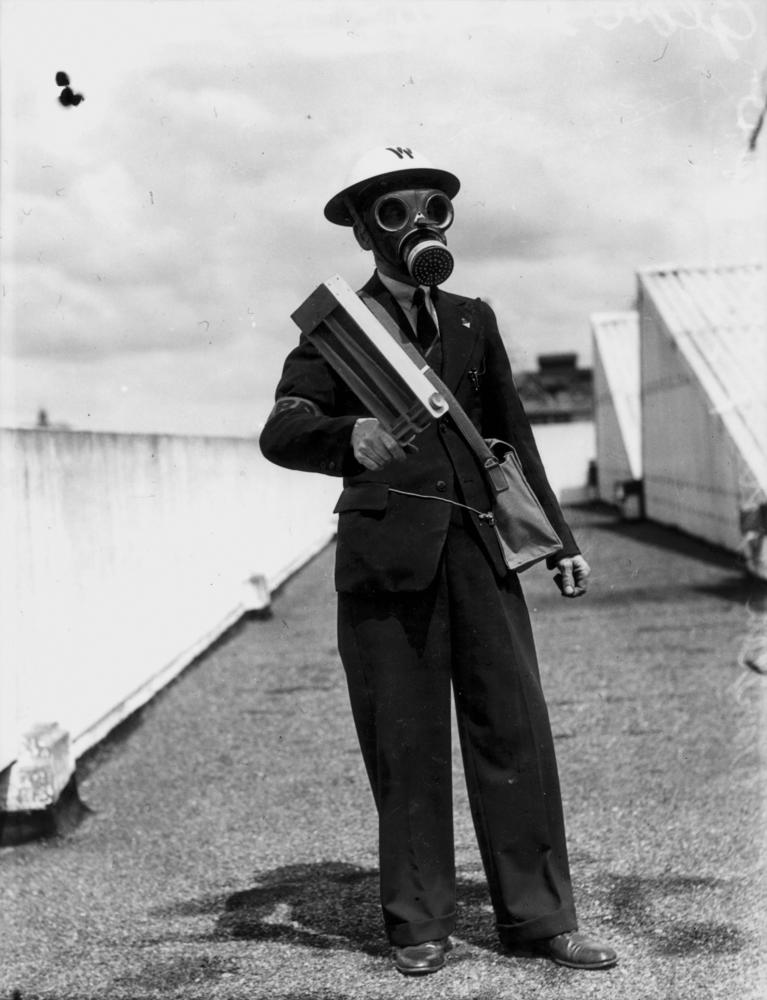
Air Raid Warden testing his equipment in Brisbane, Australia, in October 1942

The organization of civil defense was the responsibility of the local authority. Volunteers were ascribed to different units depending on experience or training. Each local civil defense service was divided into several sections. Wardens were responsible for local reconnaissance and reporting, and leadership, organization, guidance and control of the general public. Wardens would also advise survivors of the locations of rest and food centers, and other welfare facilities.

Rescue Parties were required to assess and then access bombed-out buildings and retrieve injured or dead people. In addition they would turn off gas, electricity and water supplies, and repair or pull down unsteady buildings. Medical services, including First Aid Parties, provided on the spot medical assistance.

The expected stream of information that would be generated during an attack was handled by 'Report and Control' teams. A local headquarters would have an ARP controller who would direct rescue, first aid and decontamination teams to the scenes of reported bombing. If local services were deemed insufficient to deal with the incident then the controller could request assistance from surrounding boroughs.

Fire Guards were responsible for a designated area/building and required to monitor the fall of incendiary bombs and pass on news of any fires that had broken out to the NFS. They could deal with an individual magnesium alloy ("Elektron") incendiary bomb by dousing it with buckets of sand or water or by smothering. Additionally, 'Gas Decontamination Teams' kitted out with gas-tight and waterproof protective clothing were to deal with any gas attacks. They were trained to decontaminate buildings, roads, rail and other material that had been contaminated by liquid or jelly gases.

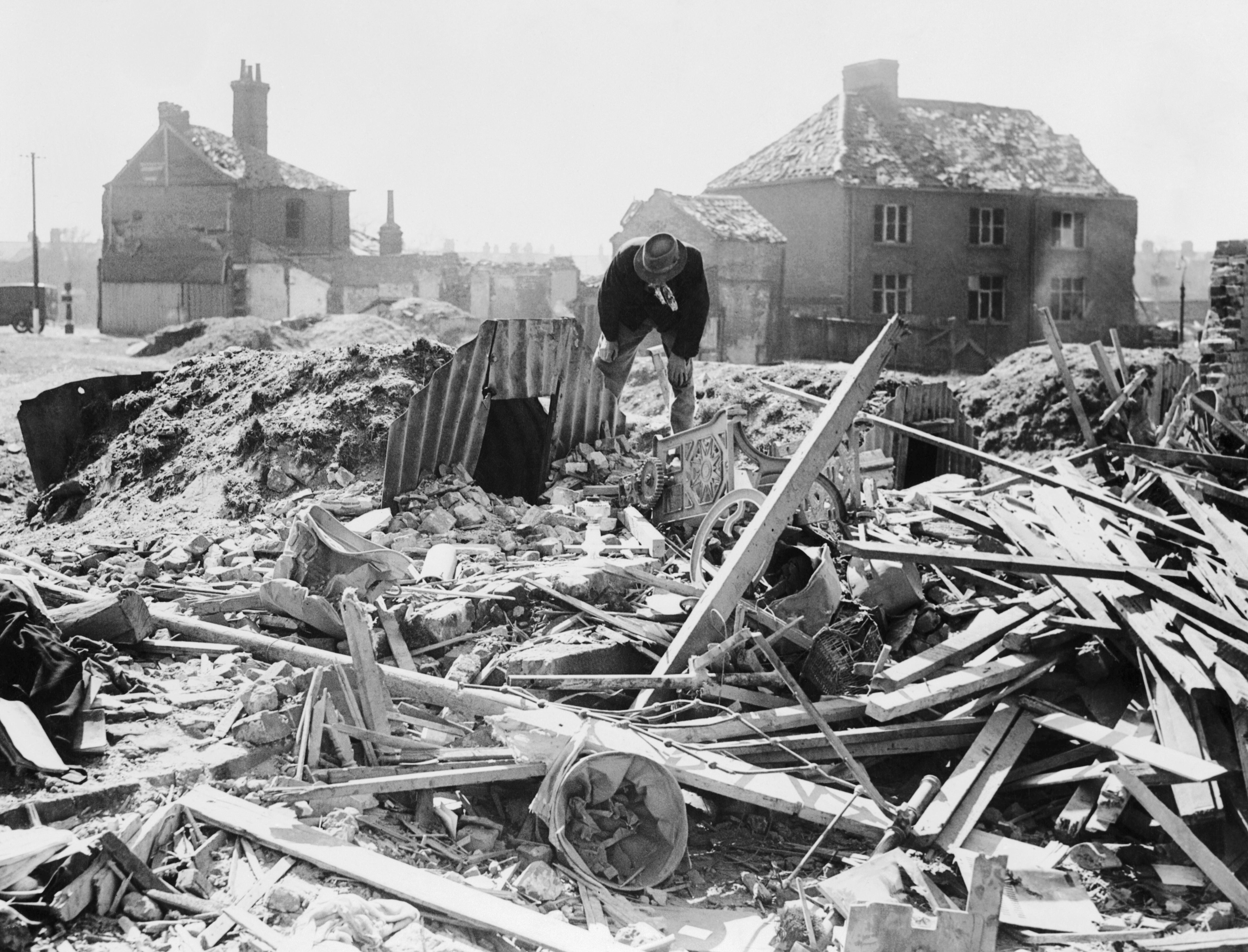
Anderson shelters were widely distributed in the United Kingdom by civil defense authorities, in preparation for aerial bombardment.

Little progress was made over the issue of air-raid shelters, because of the apparently irreconcilable conflict between the need to send the public underground for shelter and the need to keep them above ground for protection against gas attacks. In February 1936 the Home Secretary appointed a technical Committee on Structural Precautions against Air Attack. During the Munich crisis, local authorities dug trenches to provide shelter. After the crisis, the British Government decided to make these a permanent feature, with a standard design of precast concrete trench lining. They also decided to issue the Anderson shelter free to poorer households and to provide steel props to create shelters in suitable basements.

During the Second World War, the ARP was responsible for the issuing of gas masks, pre-fabricated air-raid shelters (such as Anderson shelters, as well as Morrison shelters), the upkeep of local public shelters, and the maintenance of the blackout. The ARP also helped rescue people after air raids and other attacks, and some women became ARP Ambulance Attendants whose job was to help administer first aid to casualties, search for survivors, and in many grim instances, help recover bodies, sometimes those of their own colleagues.

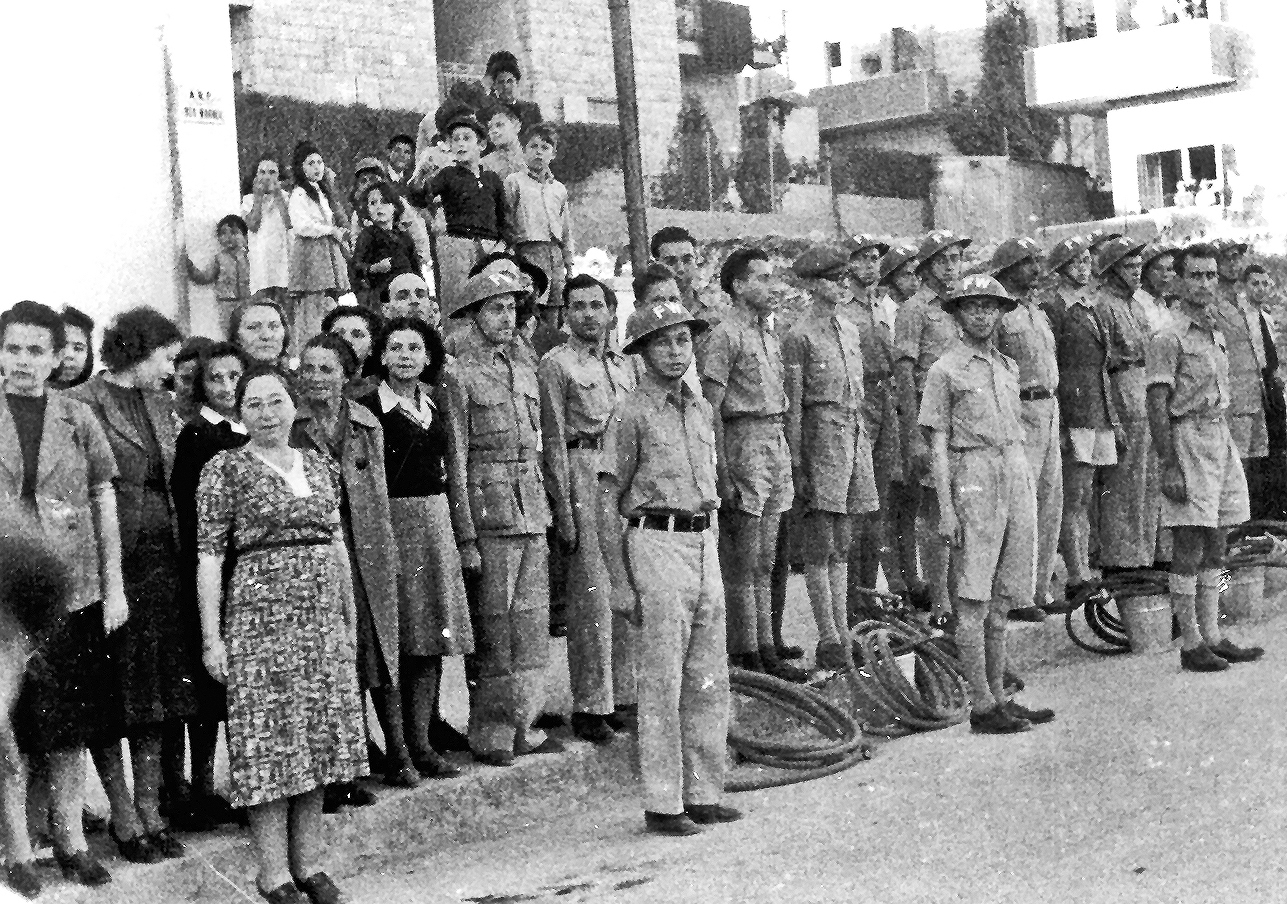
Jewish Civil Defense group in Jerusalem in 1942. The group served as ARP Fire Wardens, equipped with water hoses and buckets, some wearing FW (Fire Watcher) Brodie helmets. Men are in uniform while women wear plain clothes. Composer Josef Tal stands next to the woman with a black sweater.

As the war progressed, the military effectiveness of Germany's aerial bombardment was very limited. Thanks to the Luftwaffe's shifting aims, the strength of British air defenses, the use of early warning radar in combination with the Royal Observer Corps, and the life-saving actions of local civil defense units, the aerial "Blitz" during the Battle of Britain failed to break the morale of the British people, destroy the Royal Air Force or significantly hinder British industrial production. Despite a significant investment in civil and military defense, British civilian losses during the Blitz were higher than in most strategic bombing campaigns throughout the war. For example, there were 14,000–20,000 UK civilian fatalities during the Battle of Britain, a relatively high number considering that the Luftwaffe dropped only an estimated 30,000 tons of ordinance during the battle. Granted, this resulting 0.47–0.67 civilian fatalities per ton of bombs dropped was lower than the earlier 121 casualties per ton prediction. However, in comparison, Allied strategic bombing of Germany during the war proved slightly less lethal than what was observed in the UK, with an estimated 400,000–600,000 German civilian fatalities for approximately 1.35 million tons of bombs dropped on Germany, an estimated resulting rate therefore of 0.30–0.44 civilian fatalities per ton of bombs dropped.

==== United States ====
In the United States, the Office of Civilian Defense was established in May 1941 to coordinate civilian defense efforts. It coordinated with the Department of the Army and established similar groups to the British ARP. One of these groups that still exists today is the Civil Air Patrol, which was originally created as a civilian auxiliary to the Army. The CAP was created on December 1, 1941, with the main civil defense mission of search and rescue. The CAP also sank two Axis submarines and provided aerial reconnaissance for Allied and neutral merchant ships. In 1946, the Civil Air Patrol was barred from combat by Public Law 79-476. The CAP then received its current mission: search and rescue for downed aircraft. When the Air Force was created, in 1947, the Civil Air Patrol became the auxiliary of the Air Force.

The Coast Guard Auxiliary performs a similar role in support of the U.S. Coast Guard. Like the Civil Air Patrol, the Coast Guard Auxiliary was established in the run up to World War II. Auxiliarists were sometimes armed during the war, and extensively participated in port security operations. After the war, the Auxiliary shifted its focus to promoting boating safety and assisting the Coast Guard in performing search and rescue and marine safety and environmental protection.

In the United States a federal civil defense program existed under Public Law 920 of the 81st Congress, as amended, from 1951 to 1994. That statutory scheme was made so-called all-hazards by Public Law 103–160 in 1993 and largely repealed by Public Law 103–337 in 1994. Parts now appear in Title VI of the Robert T. Stafford Disaster Relief and Emergency Assistance Act, Public Law 100-107 [1988 as amended]. The term EMERGENCY PREPAREDNESS was largely codified by that repeal and amendment. See 42 USC Sections 5101 and following.

=== Post–World War II ===
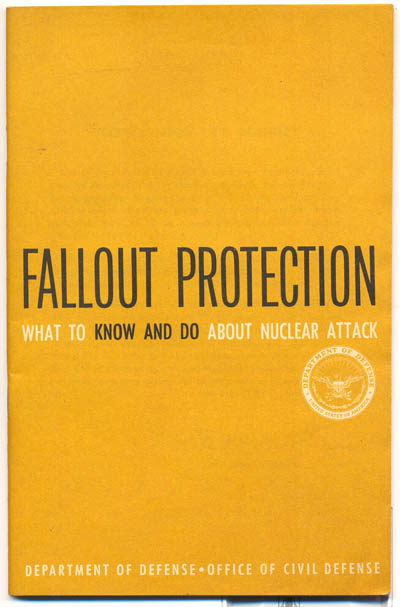
Civil Defense literature, such as Fallout Protection, was common during the Cold War era.

In most of the states of the North Atlantic Treaty Organization, such as the United States, the United Kingdom and West Germany, as well as the Soviet Bloc, and especially in the neutral countries, such as Switzerland and in Sweden during the 1950s and 1960s, many civil defense practices took place to prepare for the aftermath of a nuclear war, which seemed quite likely at that time.

In the United Kingdom, the Civil Defence Service was disbanded in 1945, followed by the ARP in 1946. With the onset of the growing tensions between East and West, the service was revived in 1949 as the Civil Defence Corps. As a civilian volunteer organization, it was tasked to take control in the aftermath of a major national emergency, principally envisaged as being a Cold War nuclear attack. Although under the authority of the Home Office, with a centralized administrative establishment, the corps was administered locally by Corps Authorities. In general every county was a Corps Authority, as were most county boroughs in England and Wales and large burghs in Scotland.

Each division was divided into several sections, including the Headquarters, Intelligence and Operations, Scientific and Reconnaissance, Warden & Rescue, Ambulance and First Aid and Welfare.

In 1954 Coventry City Council caused international controversy when it announced plans to disband its Civil Defence committee because the councillors had decided that hydrogen bombs meant that there could be no recovery from a nuclear attack. The British government opposed such a move and held a provocative Civil Defence exercise on the streets of Coventry which Labour council members protested against. The government also decided to implement its own committee at the city's cost until the council reinstituted its committee.

In the United States, the sheer power of nuclear weapons and the perceived likelihood of such an attack precipitated a greater response than had yet been required of civil defense. Civil defense, previously considered an important and commonsense step, became divisive and controversial in the charged atmosphere of the Cold War. In 1950, the National Security Resources Board created a 162-page document outlining a model civil defense structure for the U.S. Called the "Blue Book" by civil defense professionals in reference to its solid blue cover, it was the template for legislation and organization for the next 40 years.

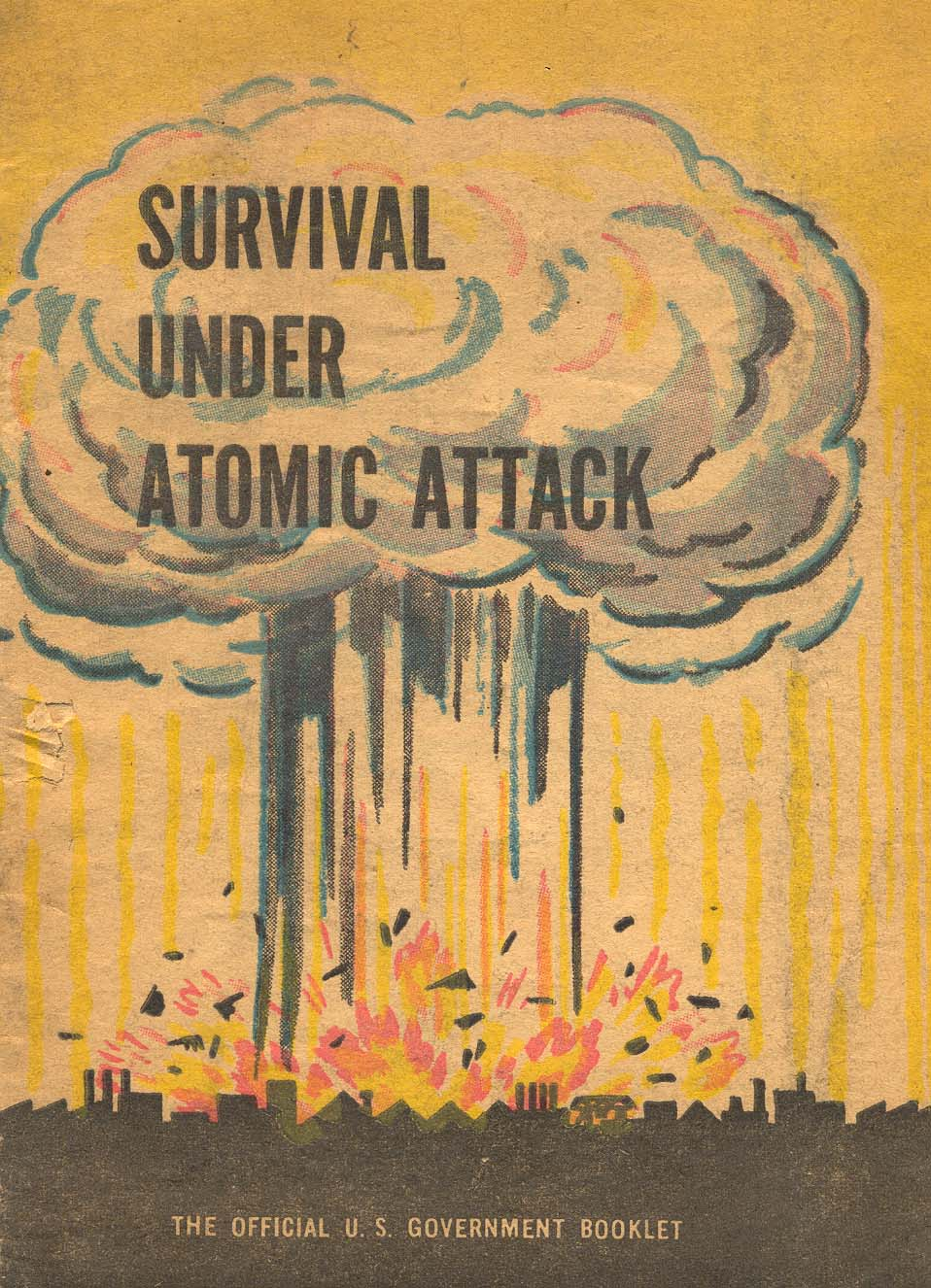
Civil Defense literature, such as Survival Under Atomic Attack, was common during the Cold War Era.

Perhaps the most memorable aspect of the Cold War civil defense effort was the educational effort made or promoted by the government. In Duck and Cover, Bert the Turtle advocated that children "duck and cover" when they "see the flash." Booklets such as Survival Under Atomic Attack, Fallout Protection and Nuclear War Survival Skills were also commonplace. The transcribed radio program Stars for Defense combined hit music with civil defense advice. Government institutes created public service announcements including children's songs and distributed them to radio stations to educate the public in case of nuclear attack.

The United States and Soviet Union/Russia nuclear stockpiles, in total number of nuclear bombs/warheads in existence throughout the Cold War and post-Cold War era. However, total deployed US & "Russian" strategic weapons (ready for use) were far less than this, reaching a maximum of about 10,000 apiece in the 1980s.

The US President Kennedy (1961–1963) launched an ambitious effort to install fallout shelters throughout the United States. These shelters would not protect against the blast and heat effects of nuclear weapons, but would provide some protection against the radiation effects that would last for weeks and even affect areas distant from a nuclear explosion. In order for most of these preparations to be effective, there had to be some degree of warning. In 1951, CONELRAD (Control of Electromagnetic Radiation) was established. Under the system, a few primary stations would be alerted of an emergency and would broadcast an alert. All broadcast stations throughout the country would be constantly listening to an upstream station and repeat the message, thus passing it from station to station.

In a once classified US war game analysis, looking at varying levels of war escalation, warning and pre-emptive attacks in the late 1950s early 1960s, it was estimated that approximately 27 million US citizens would have been saved with civil defense education. At the time, however, the cost of a full-scale civil defense program was regarded as less effective in cost-benefit analysis than a ballistic missile defense (Nike Zeus) system, and as the Soviet adversary was increasing their nuclear stockpile, the efficacy of both would follow a diminishing returns trend.

Contrary to the largely noncommittal approach taken in NATO, with its stops and starts in civil defense depending on the whims of each newly elected government, the military strategy in the comparatively more ideologically consistent USSR held that, amongst other things, a winnable nuclear war was possible. To this effect the Soviets planned to minimize, as far as possible, the effects of nuclear weapon strikes on its territory, and therefore spent considerably more thought on civil defense preparations than in U.S., with defense plans that have been assessed to be far more effective than those in the U.S.

Soviet Civil Defense Troops played the main role in the massive disaster relief operation following the 1986 Chernobyl nuclear accident. Defense Troop reservists were officially mobilized (as in a case of war) from throughout the USSR to join the Chernobyl task force and formed on the basis of the Kyiv Civil Defense Brigade. The task force performed some high-risk tasks including, with the failure of their robotic machinery, the manual removal of highly-radioactive debris. Many of their personnel were later decorated with medals for their work at containing the release of radiation into the environment, with a number of the 56 deaths from the accident being Civil defense troops.

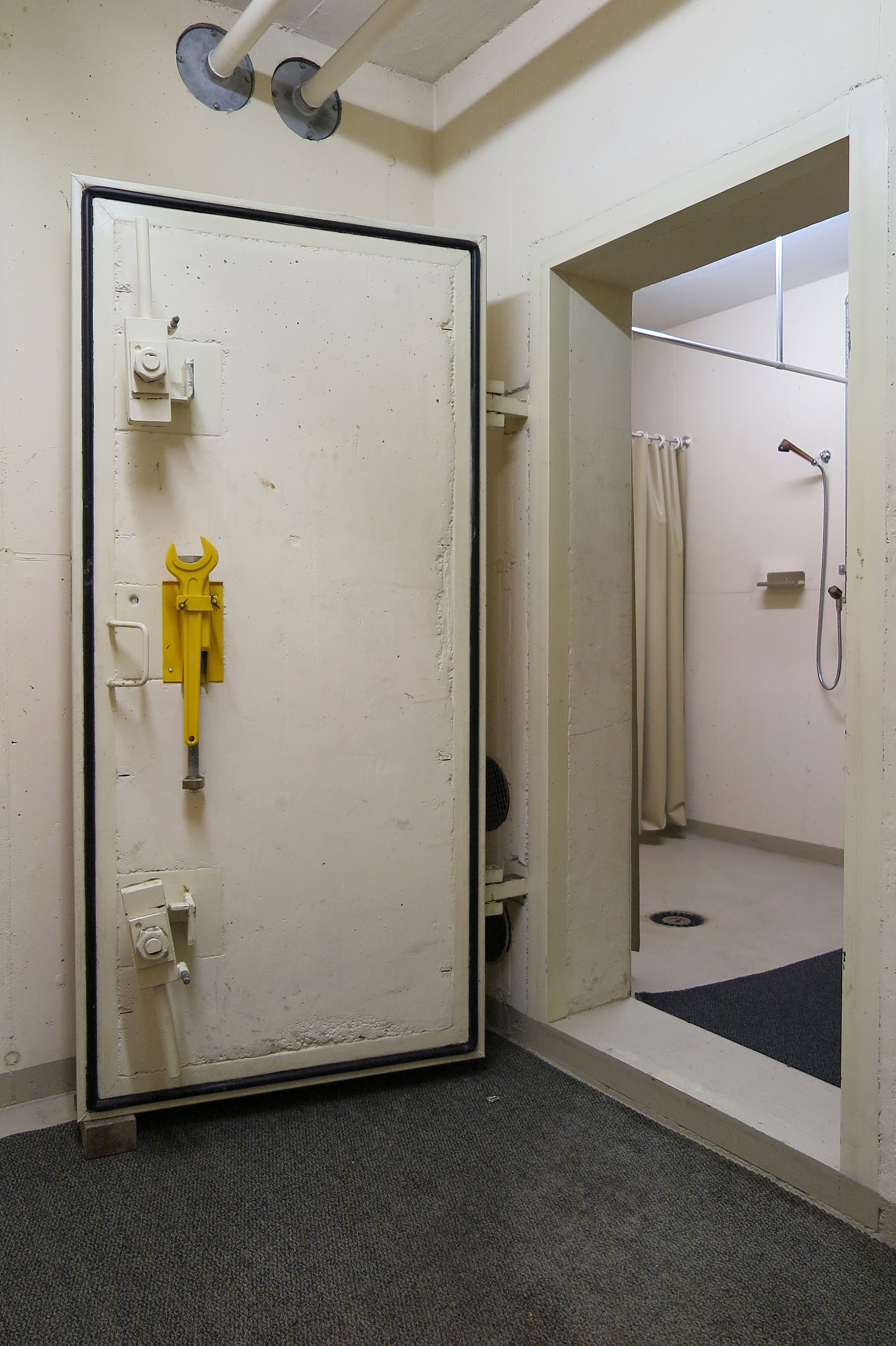
The reinforced door of a fallout shelter of the civil protection in Switzerland. As of 2006, there were about 300,000 shelters in private and public buildings for a total of 8.6 million places, a level of coverage corresponding to 114% of the Swiss population.

In Western countries, strong civil defense policies were never properly implemented, because it was fundamentally at odds with the doctrine of "mutual assured destruction" (MAD) by making provisions for survivors. It was also considered that a full-fledged total defense would have not been worth the very large expense. For whatever reason, the public saw efforts at civil defense as fundamentally ineffective against the powerful destructive forces of nuclear weapons, and therefore a waste of time and money, although detailed scientific research programs did underlie the much-mocked government civil defense pamphlets of the 1950s and 1960s.

The Civil Defence Corps was stood down in Great Britain in 1968 due to the financial crisis of the mid-1960s. Its neighbors, however, remained committed to Civil Defence, namely the Isle of Man Civil Defence Corps and Civil Defence Ireland (Ireland).

In the United States, the various civil defense agencies were replaced with the Federal Emergency Management Agency (FEMA) in 1979. In 2002 this became part of the Department of Homeland Security. The focus was shifted from nuclear war to an "all-hazards" approach of comprehensive emergency management. Natural disasters and the emergence of new threats such as terrorism have caused attention to be focused away from traditional civil defense and into new forms of civil protection such as emergency management and homeland security.

=== 21st century ===
Many countries maintain a national Civil Defence Corps, usually having a wide brief for assisting in large scale civil emergencies such as flood, earthquake, invasion, or civil disorder.

After the September 11 attacks in 2001, in the United States the concept of civil defense has been revisited under the umbrella term of homeland security and all-hazards emergency management.

In Europe, the triangle CD logo continues to be widely used. Created in 1939 by Charles Coiner of the N. W. Ayer Advertising Agency, it was used throughout World War II and the Cold War era. In the U.S., 2006 saw the retirement of the old triangle logo, to be replaced with a stylised EM (for emergency management). A reference to the old CD logo (without the red CD letters) can be seen above the eagle's head in the FEMA seal. The name and logo continue to be used by Hawaii State Civil Defense and Guam Homeland Security/Office of Civil Defense.

The term "civil protection" is currently widely used within the European Union to refer to government-approved systems and resources tasked with protecting the non-combat population, primarily in the event of natural and technological disasters. For example, the EU's humanitarian aid policy director on the Ebola Crisis, Florika Fink-Hooijer, said that civil protection requires "not just more resources, but first and foremost better governance of the resources that are available including better synergies between humanitarian aid and civil protection". In recent years there has been emphasis on preparedness for technological disasters resulting from terrorist attack. Within EU countries the term "crisis-management" emphasizes the political and security dimension rather than measures to satisfy the immediate needs of the population.

In Australia, civil defense is the responsibility of the volunteer-based State Emergency Service. In most former Soviet countries civil defense is the responsibility of governmental ministries, such as Russia's Ministry of Emergency Situations.

== Importance ==
Relatively small investments in preparation can speed up recovery by months or years and thereby prevent millions of deaths by hunger, cold and disease. According to human capital theory in economics, a country's population is more valuable than all of the land, factories and other assets that it possesses. People rebuild a country after its destruction, and it is therefore important for the economic security of a country that it protect its people. According to psychology, it is important for people to feel as though they are in control of their own destiny, and preparing for uncertainty via civil defense may help to achieve this.

In the United States, the federal civil defense program was authorized by statute and ran from 1951 to 1994. Originally authorized by Public Law 920 of the 81st Congress, it was repealed by Public Law 93–337 in 1994. Small portions of that statutory scheme were incorporated into the Robert T. Stafford Disaster Relief and Emergency Assistance Act (Public Law 100–707) which partly superseded in part, partly amended, and partly supplemented the Disaster Relief Act of 1974 (Public Law 93-288). In the portions of the civil defense statute incorporated into the Stafford Act, the primary modification was to use the term "Emergency Preparedness" wherever the term "Civil Defence" had previously appeared in the statutory language.

An important concept initiated by President Jimmy Carter was the so-called "Crisis Relocation Program" administered as part of the federal civil defense program. That effort largely lapsed under President Ronald Reagan, who discontinued the Carter initiative because of opposition from areas potentially hosting the relocated population.

== Threat assessment ==
Threats to civilians and civilian life include NBC (Nuclear, Biological, and Chemical warfare) and others, like the more modern term CBRN (Chemical Biological Radiological and Nuclear). Threat assessment involves studying each threat so that preventative measures can be built into civilian life.

Conventional
Refers to conventional explosives. A blast shelter designed to protect only from radiation and fallout would be much more vulnerable to conventional explosives. See also fallout shelter.
Nuclear
Shelter intended to protect against nuclear blast effects would include thick concrete and other sturdy elements which are resistant to conventional explosives. The biggest threats from a nuclear attack are effects from the blast, fires and radiation. One of the most prepared countries for a nuclear attack is Switzerland. Almost every building in Switzerland has an abri (shelter) against the initial nuclear bomb and explosion followed by the fall-out. Because of this, many people use it as a safe to protect valuables, photos, financial information and so on. Switzerland also has air-raid and nuclear-raid sirens in every village.
Dirty bomb
A "radiologically enhanced weapon", or "dirty bomb", uses an explosive to spread radioactive material. This is a theoretical risk, and such weapons have not been used by terrorists. Depending on the quantity of the radioactive material, the dangers may be mainly psychological. Toxic effects can be managed by standard hazmat techniques.
Biological
The threat here is primarily from disease-causing microorganisms such as bacteria and viruses.
Chemical
Various chemical agents are a threat, such as nerve gas (VX, Sarin, and so on.).

== Stages ==
=== Mitigation ===
Civil defense logo on an Air raid siren control box in Kansas, US

Civil Defense logo on a Thunderbolt 1003 siren

Mitigation is the process of actively preventing war or the release of nuclear weapons. It includes policy analysis, diplomacy, political measures, nuclear disarmament and more military responses such as a National Missile Defense and air defense artillery. In the case of counter-terrorism, mitigation would include diplomacy, intelligence gathering and direct action against terrorist groups. Mitigation may also be reflected in long-term planning such as the design of the interstate highway system and the placement of military bases further away from populated areas.

=== Preparation ===
Preparation consists of building blast shelters and pre-positioning information, supplies, and emergency infrastructure. For example, most larger cities in the U.S. now have underground emergency operations centers that can perform civil defense coordination. FEMA also has many underground facilities for the same purpose located near major railheads such as the ones in Denton, Texas and Mount Weather, Virginia.

Other measures would include continual government inventories of grain silos, the Strategic National Stockpile, the uncapping of the Strategic Petroleum Reserve, the dispersal of lorry-transportable bridges, water purification, mobile refineries, mobile de-contamination facilities, mobile general and special purpose disaster mortuary facilities such as Disaster Mortuary Operational Response Team (DMORT) and DMORT-WMD, and other aids such as temporary housing to speed civil recovery.

On an individual scale, one means of preparation for exposure to nuclear fallout is to obtain potassium iodide (KI) tablets as a safety measure to protect the human thyroid gland from the uptake of dangerous radioactive iodine. Another measure is to cover the nose, mouth and eyes with a piece of cloth and sunglasses to protect against alpha particles, which are only an internal hazard.

To support and supplement efforts at national, regional and local level with regard to disaster prevention, the preparedness of those responsible for civil protection and the intervention in the event of disaster

- To establish a framework for effective and rapid cooperation between different civil protection services when mutual assistance is needed (police, fire service, healthcare service, public utility provider, voluntary agencies)
- To set up and implement training programs for intervention and coordination teams as well as assessment experts including joint courses and exchange systems
- To enhance the coherence of actions undertaken at international level in the field of civil protection, especially in the context of cooperation

Preparing also includes sharing information:

- To contribute to informing the public, in view of increasing citizens' level of self-protection
- To collect and disseminate validated emergency information
- To pool information on national civil protection capabilities, military and medical resources
- To ensure efficient information sharing between the different authorities

=== Response ===
Response consists first of warning civilians so they can enter fallout shelters and protect assets.

Staffing a response is always full of problems in a civil defense emergency. After an attack, conventional full-time emergency services are dramatically overloaded, with conventional fire fighting response times often exceeding several days. Some capability is maintained by local and state agencies, and an emergency reserve is provided by specialized military units, especially civil affairs, military police, judge advocates and combat engineers.

However, the traditional response to massed attack on civilian population centers is to maintain a mass-trained force of volunteer emergency workers. Studies in World War II showed that lightly trained (40 hours or less) civilians in organised teams can perform up to 95% of emergency activities when trained, liaised and supported by local government. In this plan, the populace rescues itself from most situations, and provides information to a central office to prioritize professional emergency services.

In the 1990s, this concept was revived by the Los Angeles Fire Department to cope with civil emergencies such as earthquakes. The program was widely adopted, providing standard terms for organization. In the U.S., this is now official federal policy, and it is implemented by community emergency response teams, under the Department of Homeland Security, which certifies training programs by local governments, and registers "certified disaster service workers" who complete such training.

=== Recovery ===
Recovery consists of rebuilding damaged infrastructure, buildings and production. The recovery phase is the longest and ultimately most expensive phase. Once the immediate "crisis" has passed, cooperation fades away and recovery efforts are often politicized or seen as economic opportunities.

Preparation for recovery can be very helpful. If mitigating resources are dispersed before the attack, cascades of social failures can be prevented. One hedge against bridge damage in riverine cities is to subsidize a "tourist ferry" that performs scenic cruises on the river. When a bridge is down, the ferry takes up the load.

== Civil defense organizations ==
The old United States civil defense logo. The triangle emphasized the 3-step Civil Defense philosophy used before the foundation of FEMA and comprehensive emergency management.

Civil Defense is also the name of a number of organizations around the world dedicated to protecting civilians from military attacks, as well as to providing rescue services after natural and human-made disasters alike.

Worldwide protection is managed by the United Nations Office for the Coordination of Humanitarian Affairs (OCHA).

In a few countries such as Jordan and Singapore (see Singapore Civil Defence Force), civil defense is essentially the same organization as the fire brigade. In most countries, however, civil defense is a government-managed, volunteer-staffed organization, separate from the fire brigade and the ambulance service.

As the threat of Cold War eased, a number of such civil defense organizations have been disbanded or mothballed (as in the case of the Royal Observer Corps in the United Kingdom and the United States civil defense), while others have changed their focuses into providing rescue services after natural disasters (as for the State Emergency Service in Australian states). However, the ideals of Civil Defense have been brought back in the United States under FEMA's Citizen Corps and Community Emergency Response Team (CERT).

In the United Kingdom Civil Defence work is carried out by Emergency Responders under the Civil Contingencies Act 2004, with assistance from voluntary groups such as RAYNET, Search and Rescue Teams and 4x4 Response. In Ireland, the Civil Defence is still very much an active organization and is occasionally called upon for its Auxiliary Fire Service and ambulance/rescue services when emergencies such as flash flooding occur and require additional manpower. The organization has units of trained firemen and medical responders based in key areas around the country.

== See also ==
- The American Civil Defense Association
- Blast shelter
- Civil-defense Geiger counters
- Civil defense siren
- Collective protection
- Continuity of government
- Critical infrastructure protection
- Dirty bomb
- Effects of nuclear explosions on human health
- Emergency management
- Fallout shelter
- French Civil Protection
- Human security
- Industrial antiterrorism
- Infrastructure security
- International Civil Defence Organization
- List of civil defense ranks
- Mass fatality incident
- Missile
- Napalm
- Nuclear holocaust
- Nuclear terrorism
- Nuclear warfare
- Sabotage
- State Council of Civil Defense
- Survivalism
- Weapon of mass destruction
