= List of civil defense ranks =

Civil defense agencies and organizations are structured differently around the world. Civil Defense is dedicated to protecting civilians from military attacks, as well as to providing rescue services after natural and human-made disasters.

== Australia ==
=== New South Wales State Emergency Service ===
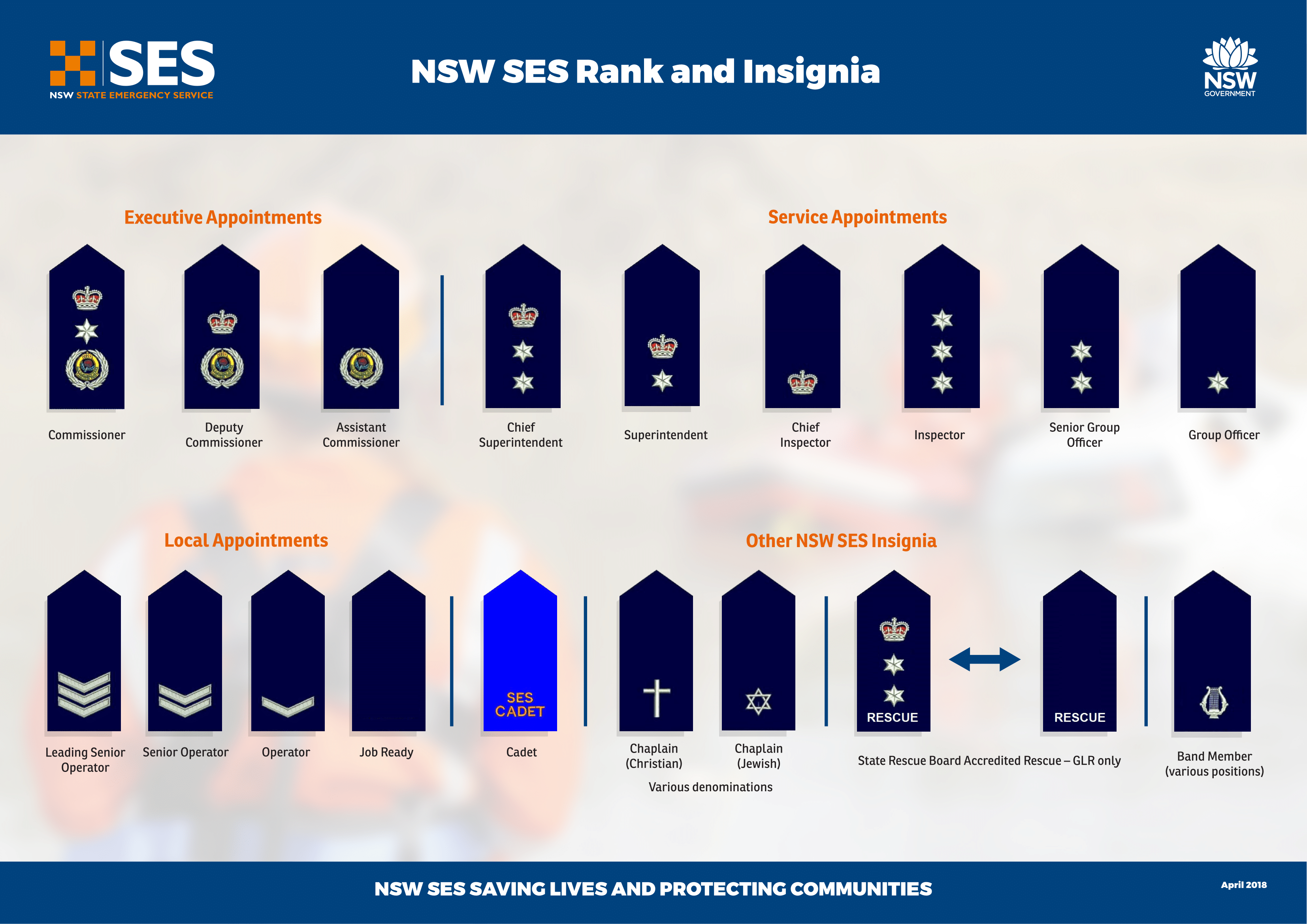

=== Queensland State Emergency Service ===
Community; Member	Field Operations; Member	Senior Field; Operations Member	Leading Field; Operations Member	Deputy; Group Leader	Group Leader	Deputy; Local Controller	Local Controller
SES Officer; Grade One	SES Officer; Grade Two	Area Director	Executive; Manager	Regional Director	*SES Assistant Commissioner		

*Prior to the establishment of the Queensland Fire & Emergency Service in 2013, the State Emergency Service used to have the ranks of Deputy Chief Officer and Chief Officer.

=== Victoria State Emergency Service ===
Staff

Chief Officer	Deputy Chief Officer	Assistant Chief Officer	Operations Manager	Operations Officer

Volunteers

Unit Controller	Deputy Controller	Section Leader

== Belgium ==
Belgian Civil Protection

Superior officers			Officers		
Colonel; Kolonel	Lieutenant-colonel; Luitenant-Kolonel	Major; Majoor	Capitaine-commandant; Kapitein-Commandant	Capitaine; Kapitein	Lieutenant; Luitenant
NCOs			Enlisted		
Adjudant; Adjudant	Sergent; Sergeant		Caporal; Korporaal		Sapeur; Sappeur
Specialists
Spécialiste de niveau 4 Vrijwilliger-Specialist 4	Spécialiste de niveau 3 Vrijwilliger-Specialist 3		Spécialiste de niveau 2 Vrijwilliger-Specialist 2		Spécialiste de niveau 1 Vrijwilliger-Specialist 1

== Denmark ==
Danish Emergency Management Agency since 2024.

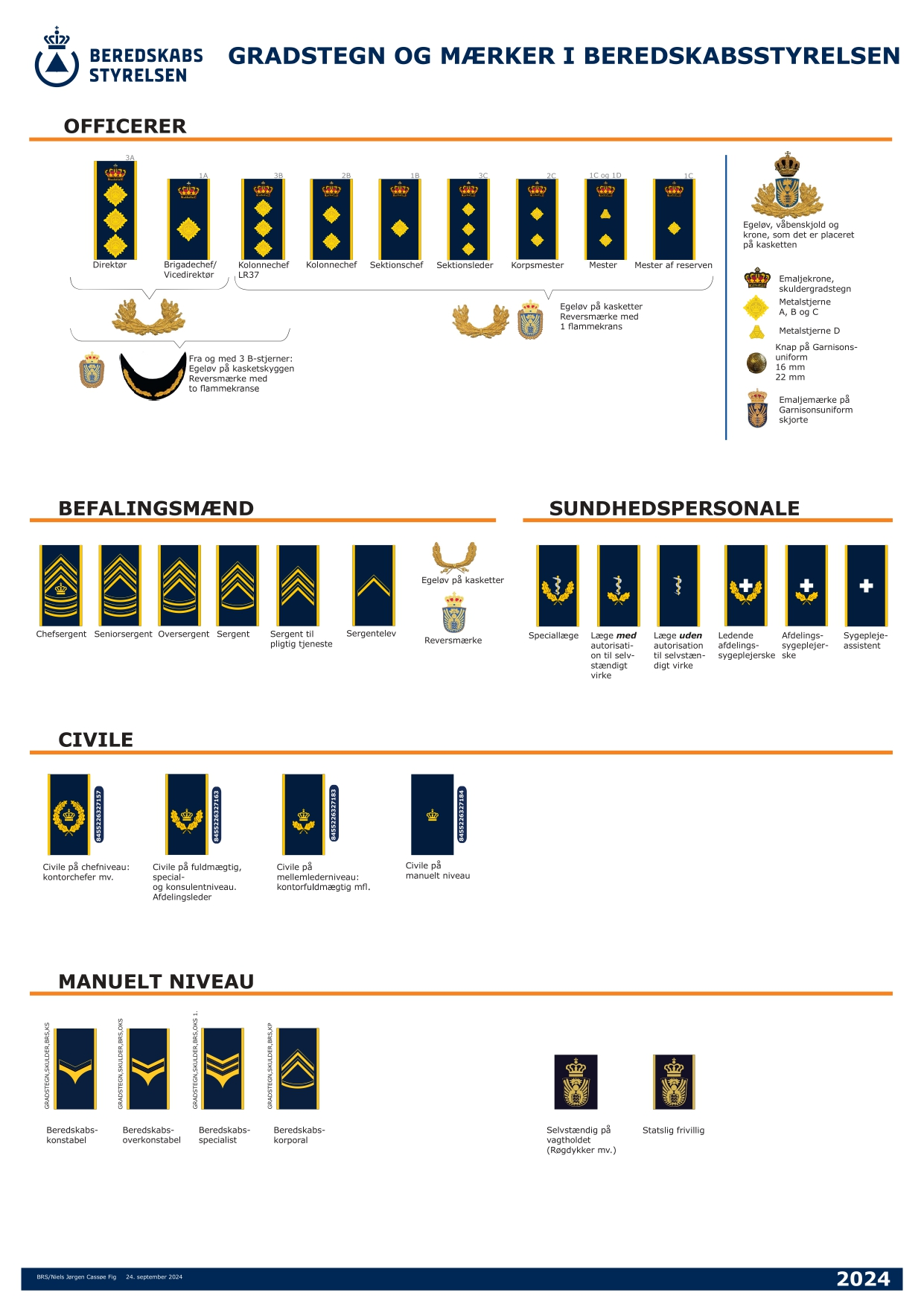

Civil Defence Corps 1972

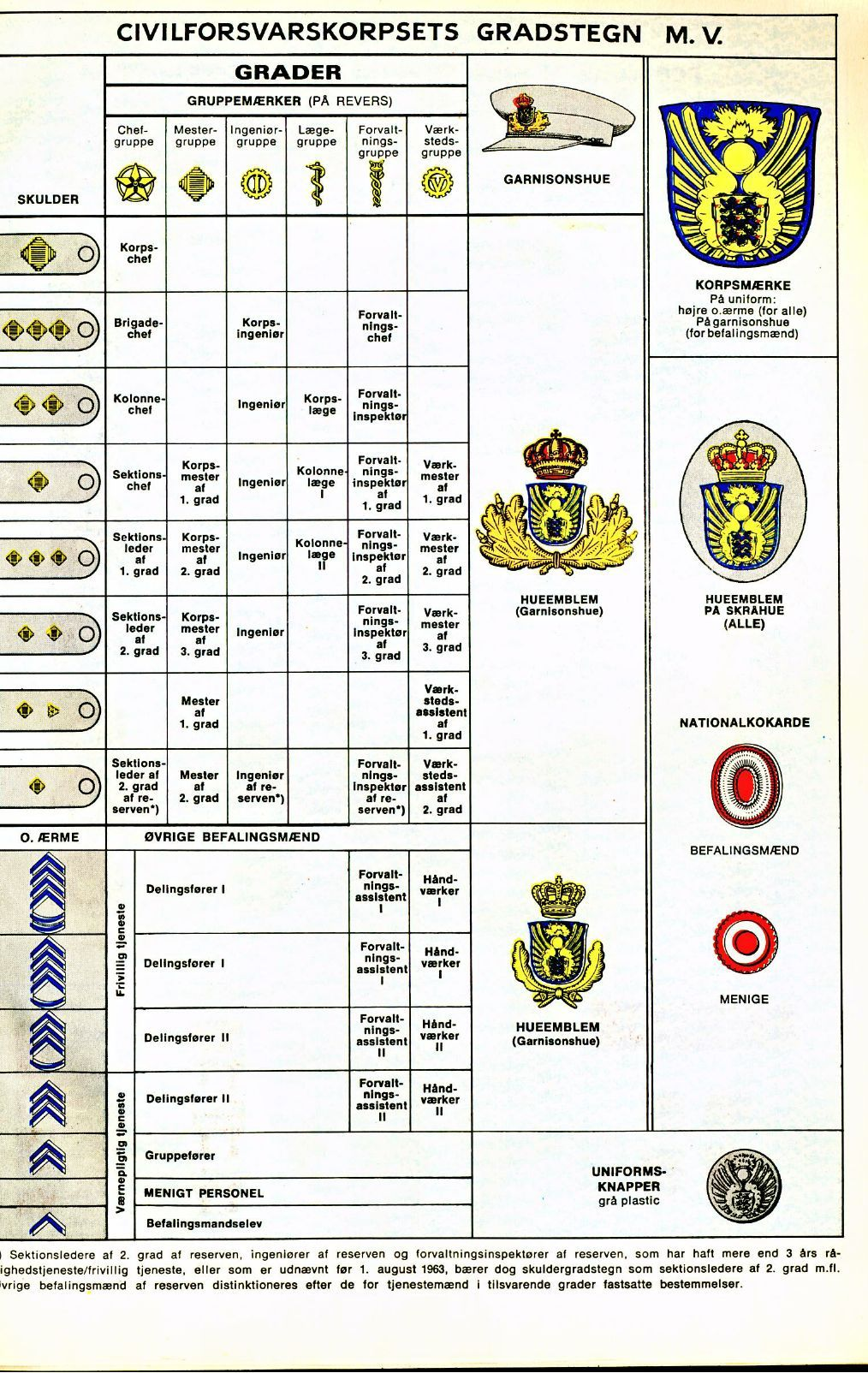

== Germany ==
Technisches Hilfswerk

Volunteers

Head of Local Branch (Ortsbeauftragter)	Deputy Head of Local Branch (Stv. Ortsbeauftragter)	Training and Qualification Officer (Ausbildungsbeauftragter) Expert Advisor (Fachberater)	Youth Activity Leader (Jugendbetreuer) Maintenance Officer (Schirrmeister) Public Relations and Volunteers Recruitment Officer (Beauftragter für Öffentlichkeitsarbeit) Administration Officer (Verwaltungsbeauftragter) Cook (Koch)

Technical Platoons & Technical Units
Technical Platoon Leader (Zugführer) Team Leader Logistics Unit(Leiter der Fachgruppe Logistik) Team Leader Command and Communications (Leiter der Fachgruppe Führung/Kommunikation)	Command Squad Leader (Zugtruppführer) Command Department Head (Sachgebietsleiter der Fachgruppe Führung/Kommunikation)	Squad Leader (Gruppenführer)	Team Leader (Truppführer) Command Assistant (Führungsgehilfe)	Volunteer (Helfer)

Spokespersons and representatives
Federal Spokesperson (Bundessprecher)	Deputy Federal Spokesperson (Stv. Bundessprecher)	State Spokesperson (Landessprecher)	Deputy State Spokesperson (Stv. Landessprecher)	Local Spokesperson (Helfersprecher) Deputy Local Spokesperson (Stv. Helfersprecher)	Representative, Federal Association ('Vertreter Bundesvereinigung) Representative, State Association (Vertreter Landesvereinigung)

Staff

Director General (Präsident)	Deputy Director General (Vizepräsident)	State Commissioner (Landesbeauftragter) President of the Federal Academy (Leiter der Bundesschule) Division Chief (Abteilungsleiter) Commissioner of Volunteers (Beauftragter für das Ehrenamt)	Department Chief (Referatsleiter) Academy Manager (Schulmanager) Chief of the Management Staff (Leiter des Leitungsstabes)	Department Consultant (Referent)

Regional Office Chief (Regionalstellenleiter)	Senior Consultant (Sachbearbeiter) Specialist Teacher (Fachlehrer)	Service Consultant (Bürosachbearbeiter Service) Instructor (Ausbilder) Technician (Gerätehandwerker) Driver (Kraftfahrer)	Consultant (Bürosachbearbeiter) Trainee (Auszubildender) Federal Service Volunteer (Absolvent Bundesfreiwilligendienst) Social Service Volunteer (Absolvent Freiwilliges Soziales Jahr) Intern (Praktikant)

== Germany 1935-1945 ==
Luftschutzpolizei

The German civil defense was activated in 1939 as the Sicherheits und Hilfsdienst, it was renamed Luftschutzpolizei in April 1942, when transferred from the aegis of Ministry of Aviation to the Ordnungspolizei.

Sicherheits-und Hilfsdienst SHD 1935-1942	Luftschutzpolizei LS 1942-1943	Luftschutzpolizei LS-Pol 1943-1945
SHD-Mann	LS-Mann	Anwärter d. LS-Pol
SHD-Mann	LS-Mann	Unterwachtmeister d. LS-Pol
SHD-Truppführer	LS-Truppführer	Rottwachtmeister d. LS-Pol
SHD-Gruppenführer	LS-Gruppenführer	Wachtmeister d. LS-Pol
SHD-Gruppenführer	LS-Gruppenführer	Oberwachtmeister d. LS-Pol
SHD-Hauptgruppenführer	LS-Hauptgruppenführer	Zugwachtmeister d. LS-Pol
SHD-Stabsgruppenführer	LS-Stabsgruppenführer	Hauptwachtmeister d. LS-Pol
–	–	Meister d. LS-Pol
SHD-Zugführer	LS-Zugführer	Zugführer d. LS-Pol
SHD-Oberzugführer	LS-Oberzugführer	Oberzugführer d. LS-Pol
SHD-Bereitschaftsführer	LS-Bereitschaftsführer	Bereitschaftsführer d. LS-Pol
SHD-Abteilungsführer	LS-Abteilungsführer	Abteilungsführer d. LS-Pol
SHD-Abteilungsführer mit besonderem Auftrag	LS-Abteilungsleiter	Oberabteilungsführer d. LS-Pol

Technische Nothilfe

The Technichal Emergency Service was in charge of technical civil defense.

Collar insignia	Shoulder insignia	Ranks		Equivalent rank in the Wehrmacht
1936–1943		1936–1943	1943–1945	Equivalent rank in the Wehrmacht
		TN-Anwärter	Anwärter der Technische Nothilfe	Soldat
		TN-Mann	—	Obersoldat
		TN-Vormann	Unterwachtmeister der Technische Nothilfe	Gefreiter
		TN-Obervormann	Rottwachtmeister der Technische Nothilfe	Obergefreiter
		TN-Scharführer	Wachtmeister der Technische Nothilfe	Unteroffizier
		—	Oberwachtmeister der Technische Nothilfe	Unterfeldwebel
		TN-Oberscharführer	Zugwachtmeister der Technische Nothilfe	Feldwebel
		TN-Hauptscharführer	Hauptwachtmeister der Technische Nothilfe	Oberfeldwebel
		TN-Stabsscharführer	Meister der Technische Nothilfe	Stabsfeldwebel
		TN-Kameradschaftsführer	Zugführer der Technische Nothilfe	Leutnant
		TN-Gemeinschaftsführer	Oberzugführer der Technische Nothilfe	Oberleutnant
		TN-Gefolgschaftsführer	Bereitschaftsführer der Technische Nothilfe	Hauptmann
		TN-Bereitschaftsführer	Abteilungsführer der Technische Nothilfe	Major
		TN-Hauptbereitschaftsführer	Oberabteilungsführer der Technische Nothilfe	Oberstleutnant
		TN-Bezirksführer	Landesführer der Technische Nothilfe	Oberst
		TN-Landesführer	Landesführer der Technische Nothilfe	Oberst
		Stellvertretender Chef der Technische Nothilfe	—	Generalmajor
		Chef der Technische Nothilfe	Chef der Technische Nothilfe	Generalleutnant

Reichsluftschutzbund

The Reich Air Protection League was in charge of air raid precautions in residential areas and among smaller businesses-

Collar insignia	Shoulder insignia	RLB rank	Translation	Luftwaffe equivalent
		Reichsluftschutzbund-Präsident	Reichsluftschutzbund president	General der Flieger
		General-Hauptluftschutzführer	General head air protection leader	Generalleutnant
		Generalluftschutzführer	General air protection leader	Generalmajor
		Oberstluftschutzführer	Chief air protection leader	Oberst
		Oberststabsluftschutzführer	Chief staff air protection leader	Oberstleutnant
		Stabsluftschutzführer	Staff air protection leader	Major
		Hauptluftschutzführer	Head air protection leader	Hauptmann
		Oberluftschutzführer	Senior air protection leader	Oberleutnant
		Luftschutzführer	Air protection leader	Leutnant
		Luftschutzobertruppmeister	Senior master air protection trooper	Feldwebel
		Luftschutztruppmeister	Master air protection trooper	Unteroffizier
		Luftschutzobertruppwart	Senior air protection trooper warden	Hauptgefreiter
		Luftschutztruppwart	Air protection trooper warden	Obergefreiter
		Luftschutzobertruppmann	Senior air protection trooper	Gefreiter
		Luftschutztruppmann	Air protection trooper	Flieger

== Ireland ==
The Civil Defence Officers and Assistant Civil Defence Officers of the Civil Defence Ireland are paid employees and are appointed by their respective local authority. At the discretion of the Civil Defence Officer, volunteer officers and leaders are appointed to assist in the command and administration of the unit .

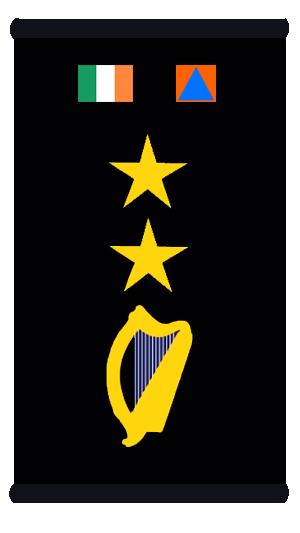
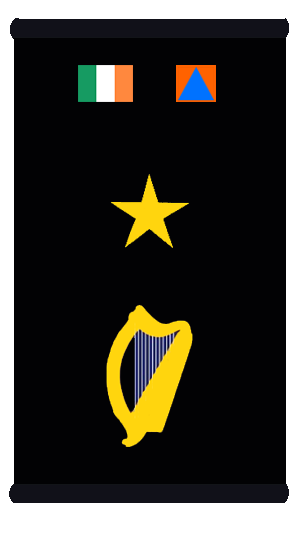
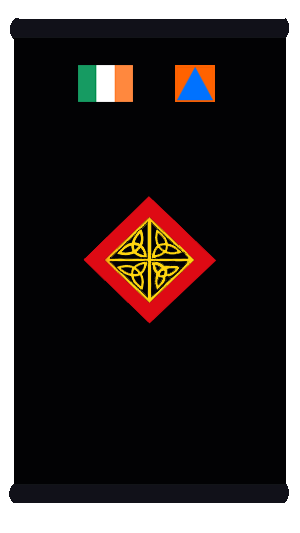
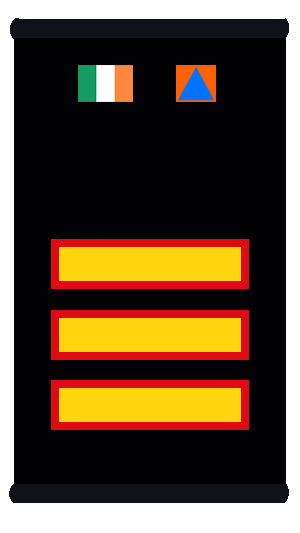
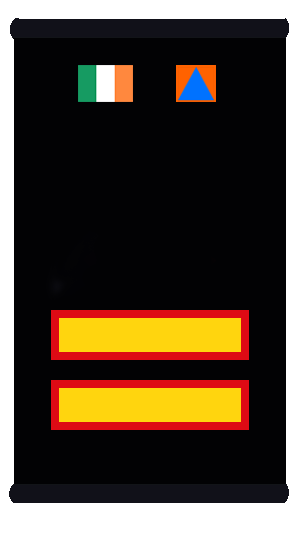
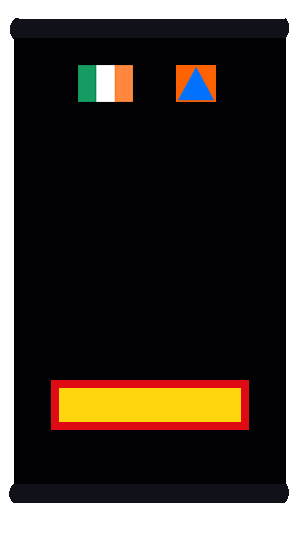
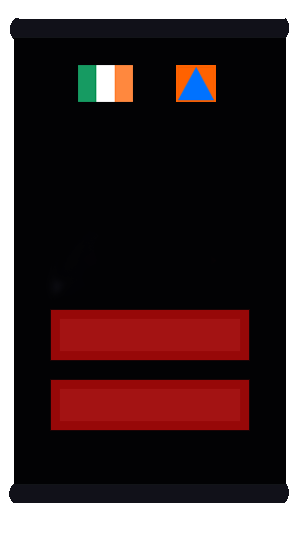
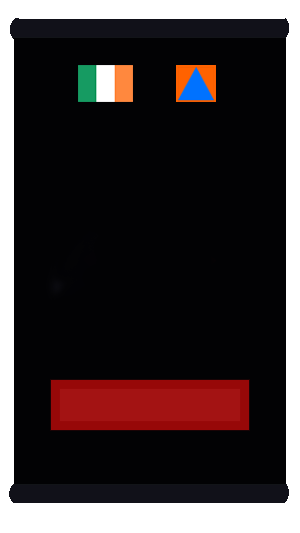
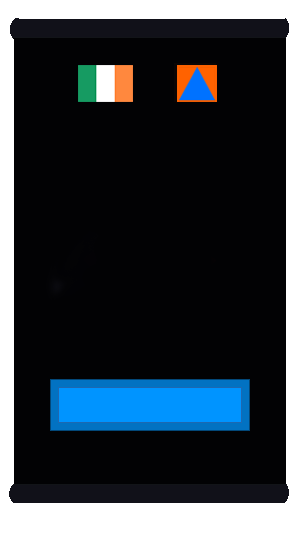
Rank	Civil; Defence Officer	Assistant Civil; Defence Officer	Commander	First Officer	Second Officer	Third Officer	Leader	Assistant Leader	Volunteer
(Republic of Ireland); Ireland
Irish language equivalent	Oifigeach; Cosanta Sibhialta	Leas-Oifigeach; Cosanta Sibhialta	Ceannasaí	Céad Oifigeach	Dara Oifigeach	Tríú Oifigeach	Ceannaire	Leas-Cheannaire	Saorálaí
Abbreviation	CDO	ACDO	Cmdr	1/O	2/O	3/O	Ldr	Asst Ldr	Vol

== Isle of Man ==
Isle of Man Civil Defence Corps Ranks and Rank Insignia
Rank	Emergency Planning Co-ordinator	Commandant	Deputy Commandant	Team Leader	Deputy Team Leader	Volunteer

== Nigeria ==
Nigeria Security and Civil Defence Corps

Officers

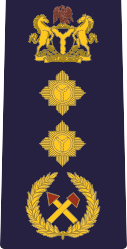
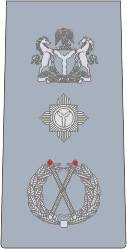
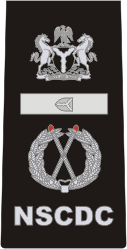
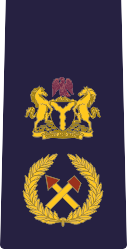
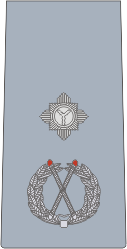
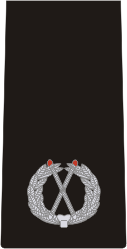
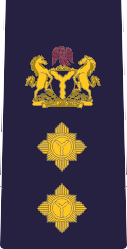
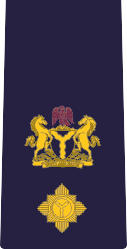
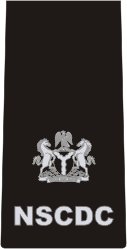
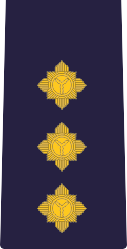
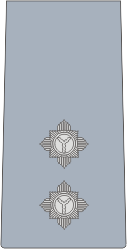
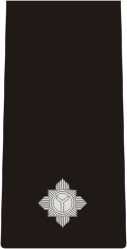
Rank group	Commandant cadre						Superintendent cadre
Nigeria SCDC
Nigeria SCDC	Commandant General	Deputy Commandant General	Assistant Commandant General	Commandant	Deputy Commandant	Assistant Commandant	Senior Superintendent	Chief Superintendent	Superintendent	Deputy Superintendent	Assistant Superintendent I	Assistant Superintendent II

Other ranks

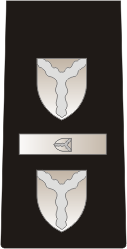
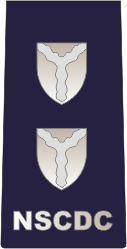
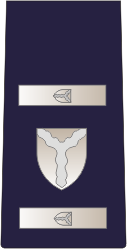
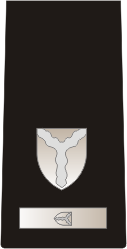
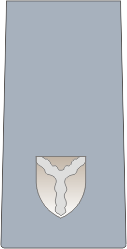
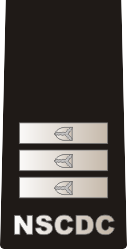
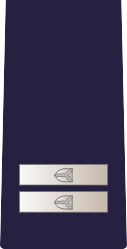
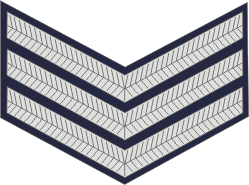
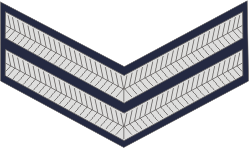
Rank group	Inspector cadre							Assistant cadre
Nigeria SCDC										No insignia
Nigeria SCDC	Chief Inspector	Deputy Chief Inspector	Assistant Chief Inspector	Principal Inspector	Senior Inspector	Inspector	Assistant Inspector	Corps Assistant I	Corps Assistant II	Corps Assistant III

== Norway ==
Norwegian Civil Defence

Chief of the Civil Defence	Assistant Chief of the Civil Defence Permanent Deputy for the Chief of Civil Defence	Head of Bureau in the Civil Defence Department Civil Defence District Commander	Civil Defence Inspector Investigation Manager Senior Advisor Chief Engineer	Advisor Chief Engineer	Civil Defense Adjutant First Consultant Consultant First Officer Operating Technician

Group Leader	Assistant Group Leader Municipal Material Manager	Squad Leader	Assistant Squad Leader Group Material Manager

== Russia ==
Ministry of Emergency Situations

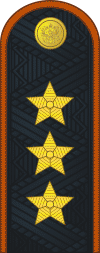
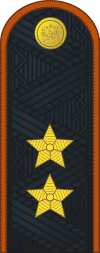
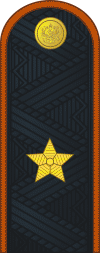
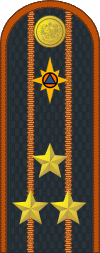
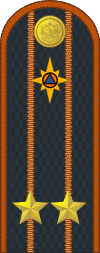
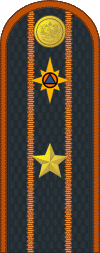
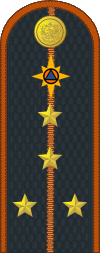
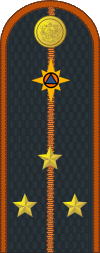
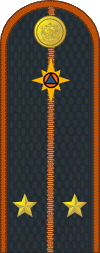
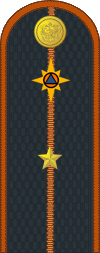
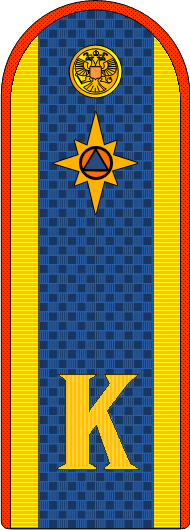
Rank group	General / flag officers			Senior officers			Junior officers
Ministry of Emergency Situations
Ministry of Emergency Situations	Генера́л-полко́вник; Generál-polkóvnik	Генера́л-лейтена́нт; Generál-leytenánt	Генера́л-майо́р; Generál-mayór	Полко́вник; Polkóvnik	Подполко́вник; Podpolkóvnik	Майо́р; Majór	Kапита́н; Kapitán	Старший лейтена́нт Stárshiy leytenánt	Лейтенант; Leytenant	Mла́дший лейтена́нт Mládshiy leytenánt	Курсант; Kursant

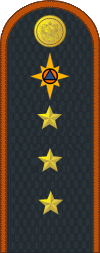
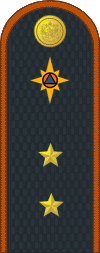
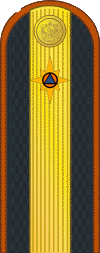
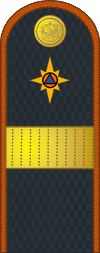
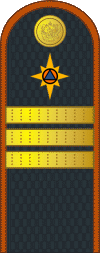
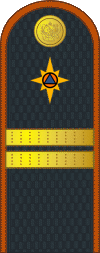
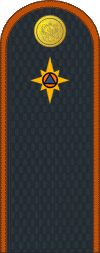
Rank group	Senior NCOs						Junior NCOs	Enlisted
Ministry of Emergency; Situations							n/a
Ministry of Emergency; Situations	Ста́рший пра́порщик Stárshiy práporshchik	Пра́порщик; Práporshchyk	Старшина́ Starshyná	Ста́рший сержа́нт Stárshiy serzhánt	Сержа́нт; Serzhánt	Мла́дший сержа́нт Mládshiy serzhánt	n/a	Рядово́й; Ryadovóy

== Singapore ==
Singapore Civil Defence Force

Officers

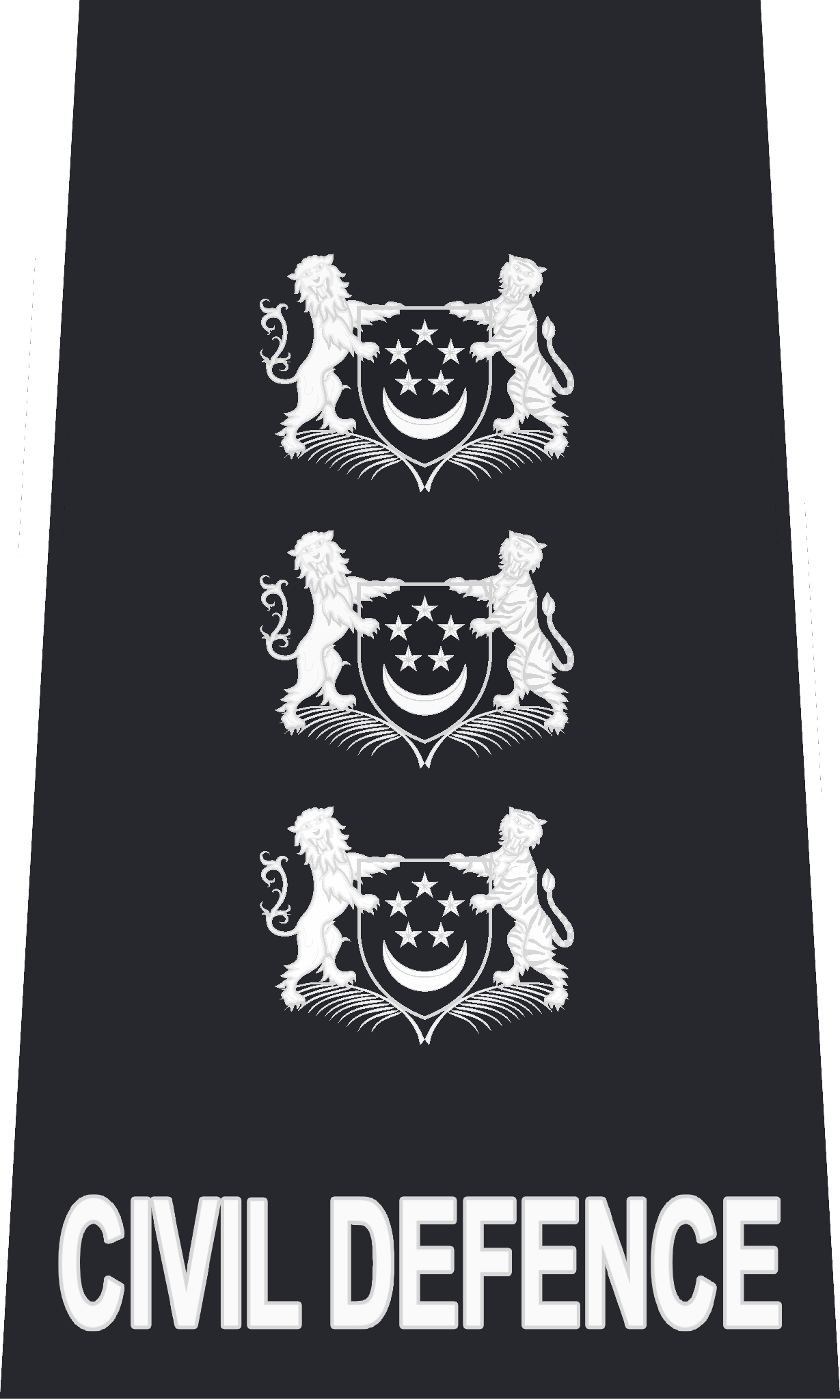
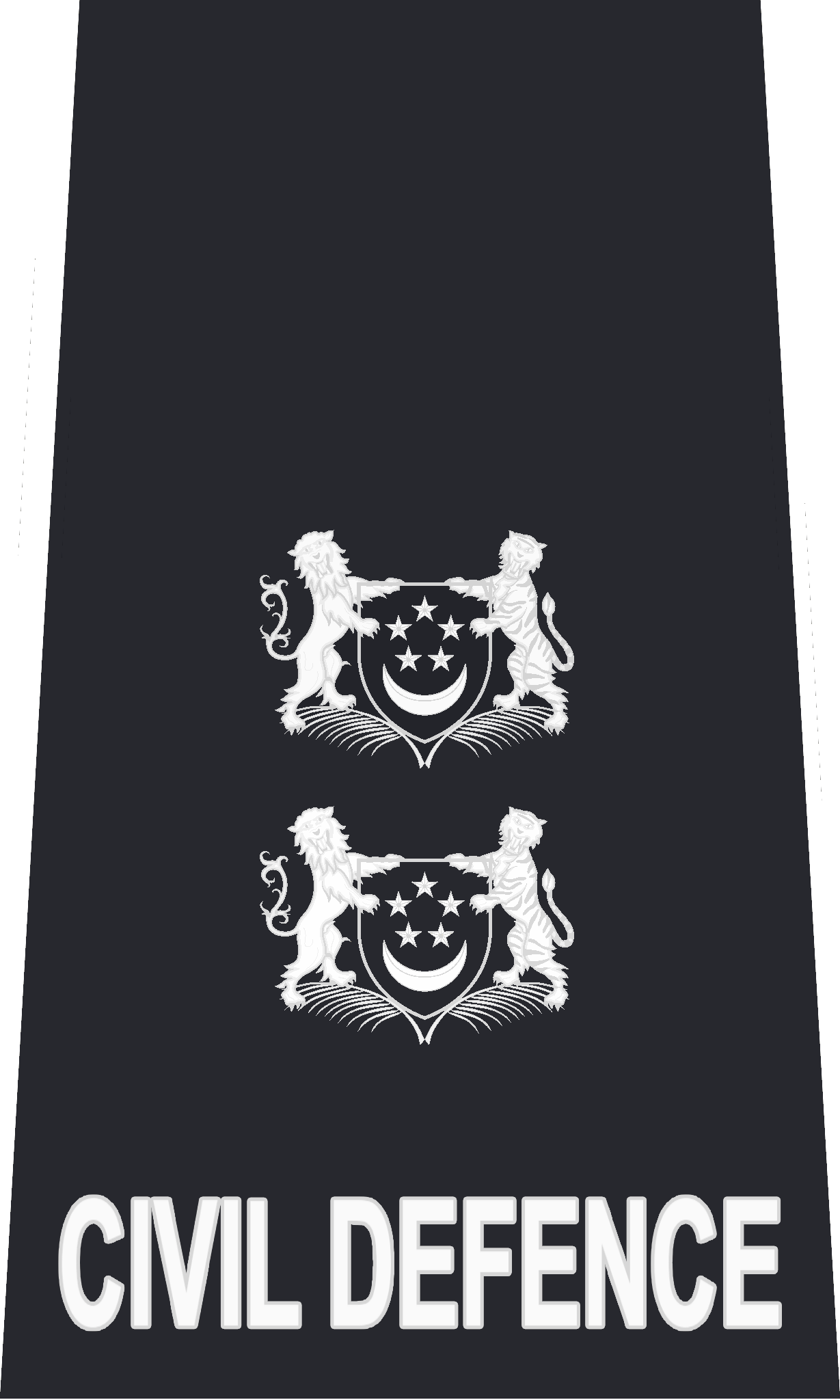
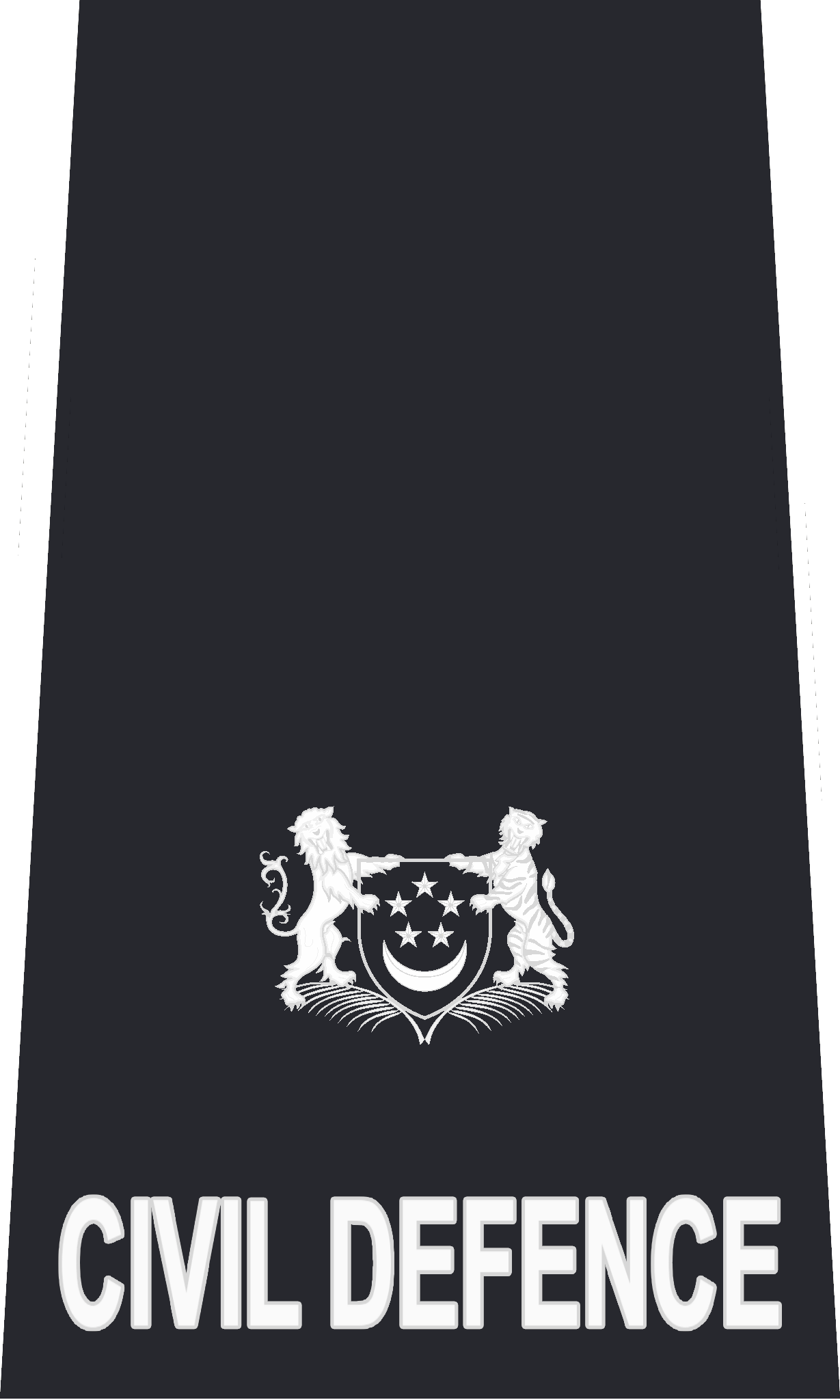
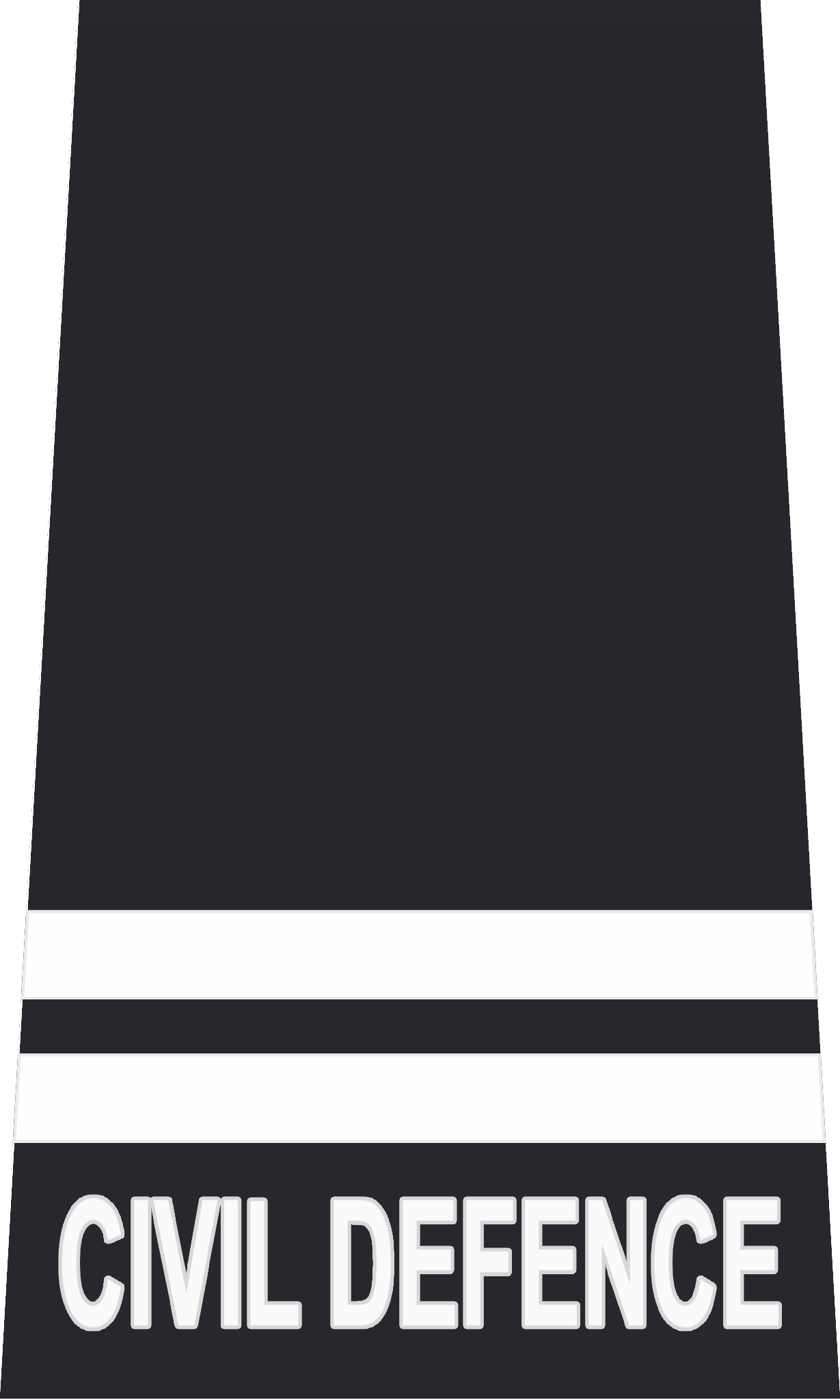
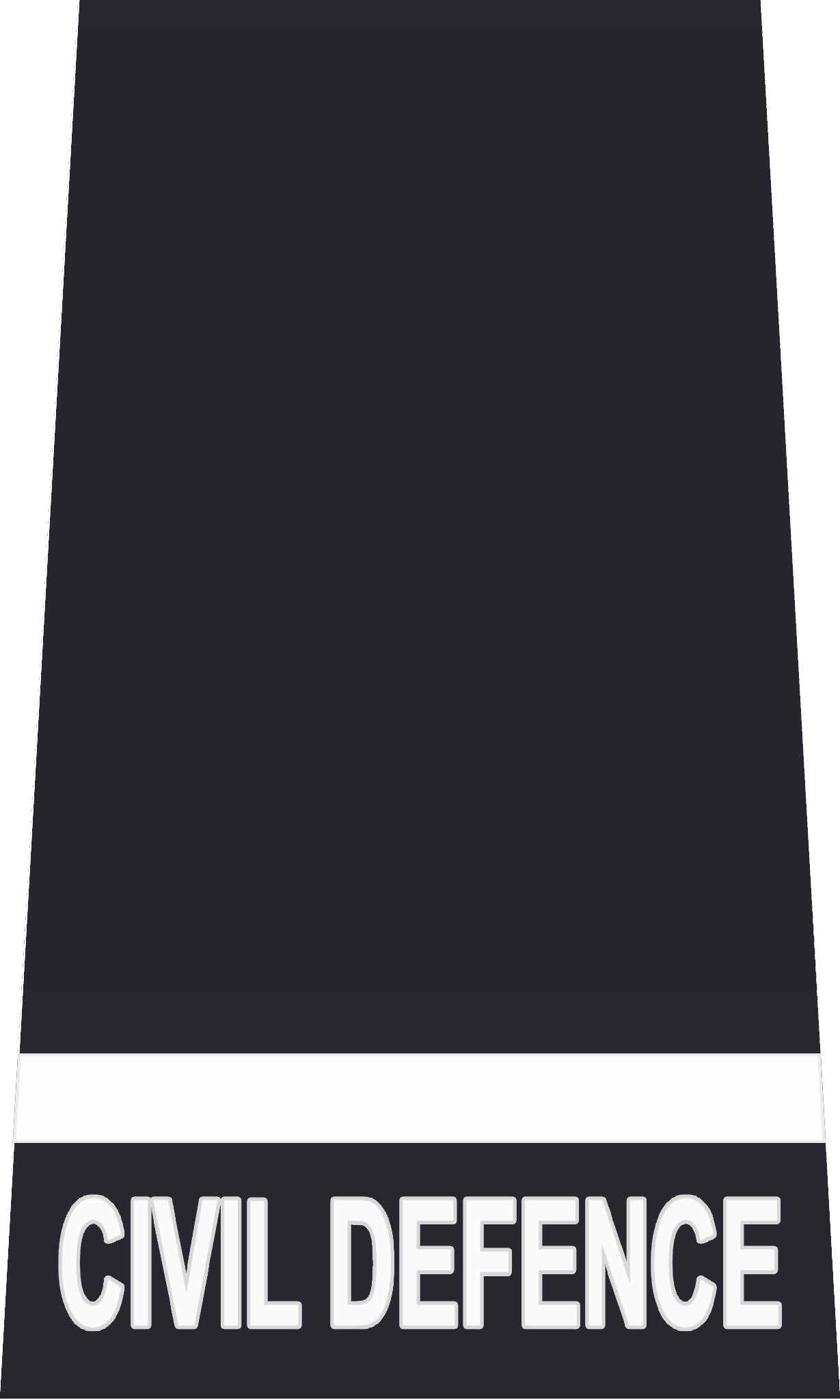
Rank group	General / flag officers				Senior officers			Junior officers
Singapore Civil Defence Force
Singapore Civil Defence Force	Commissioner	Deputy commissioner	Senior assistant commissioner	Assistant commissioner	Colonel	Lieutenant colonel	Major	Captain	Lieutenant	Second lieutenant	Officer cadet

Warrant officers

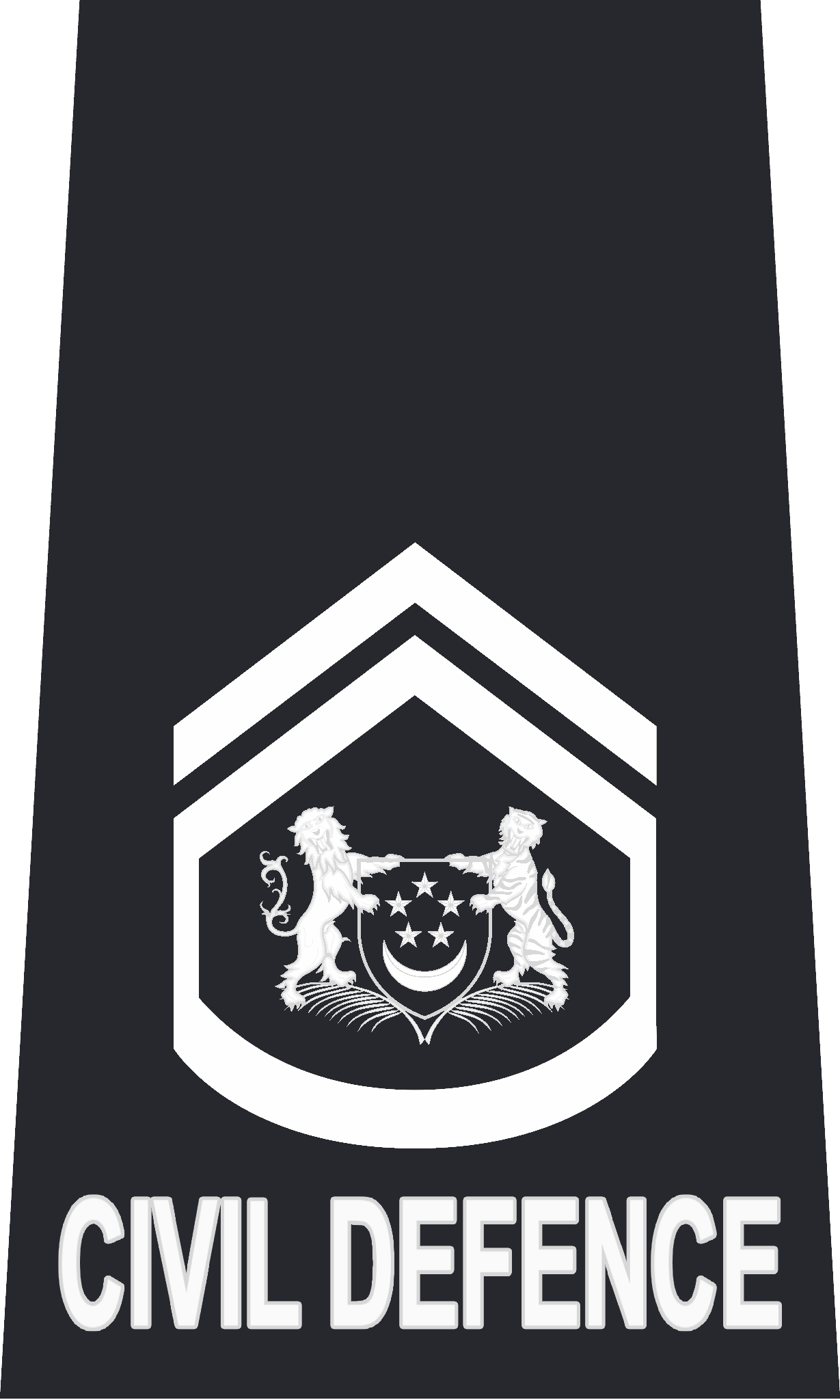
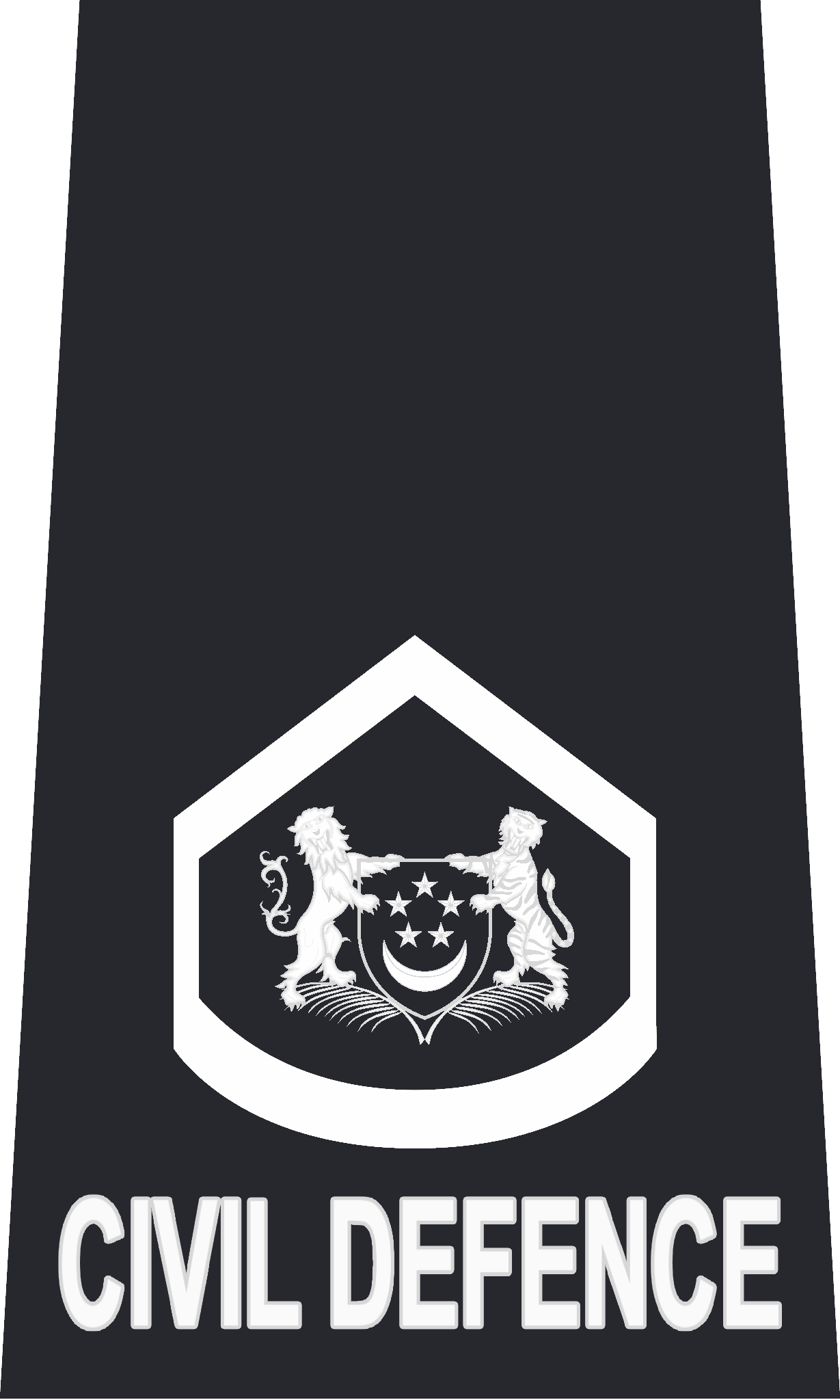
Rank group	Warrant officers
Singapore Civil Defence Force
Singapore Civil Defence Force	Warrant officer 2	Warrant officer 1

Other ranks

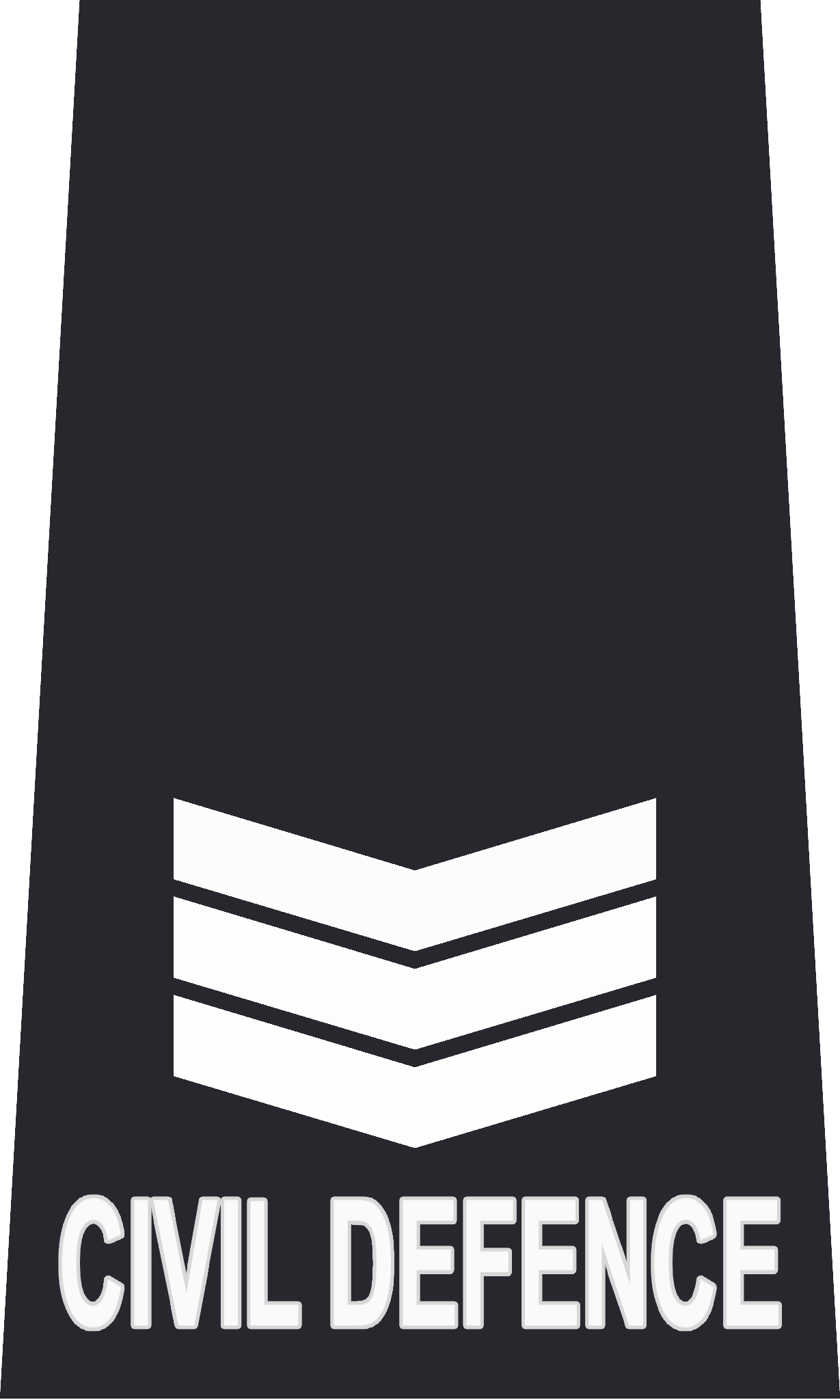
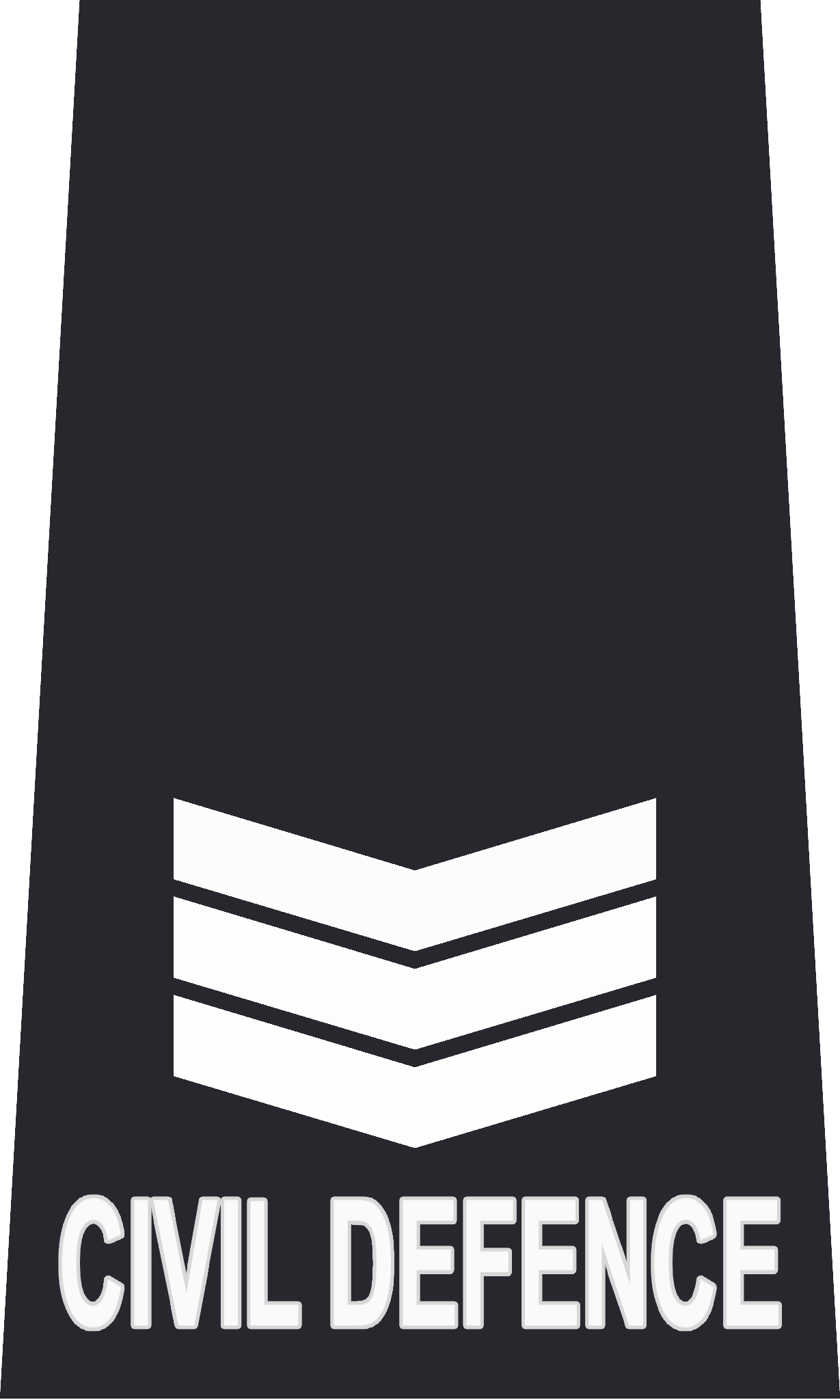
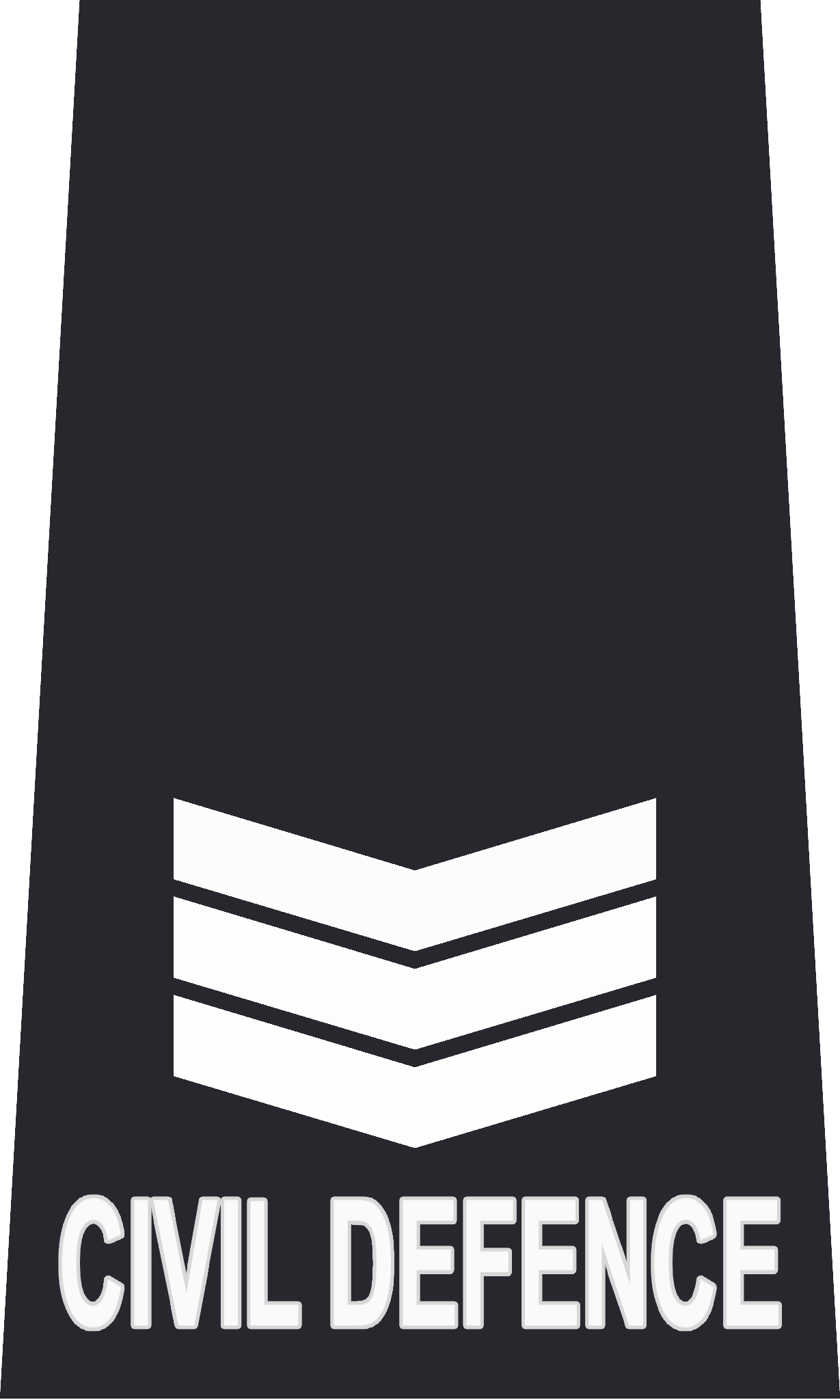
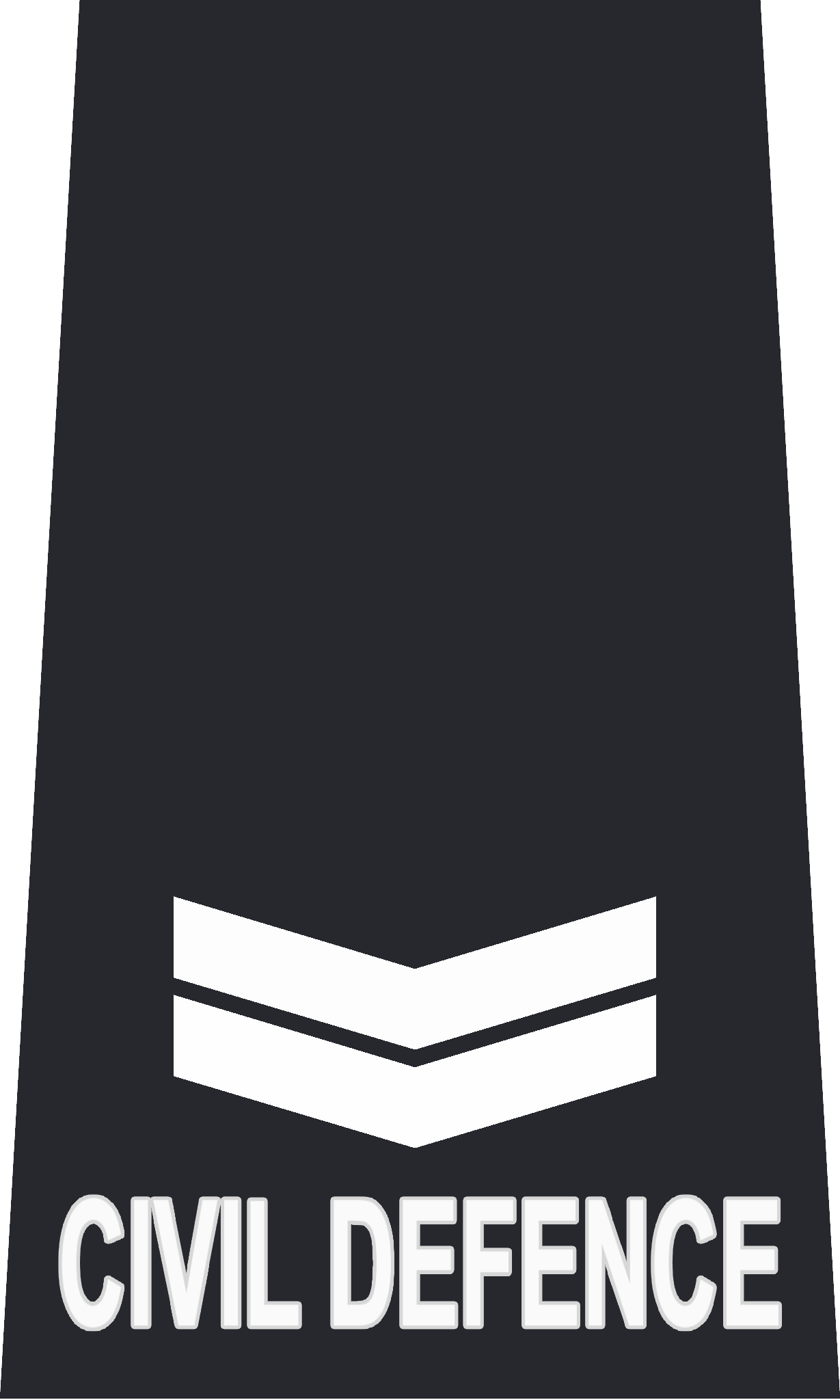
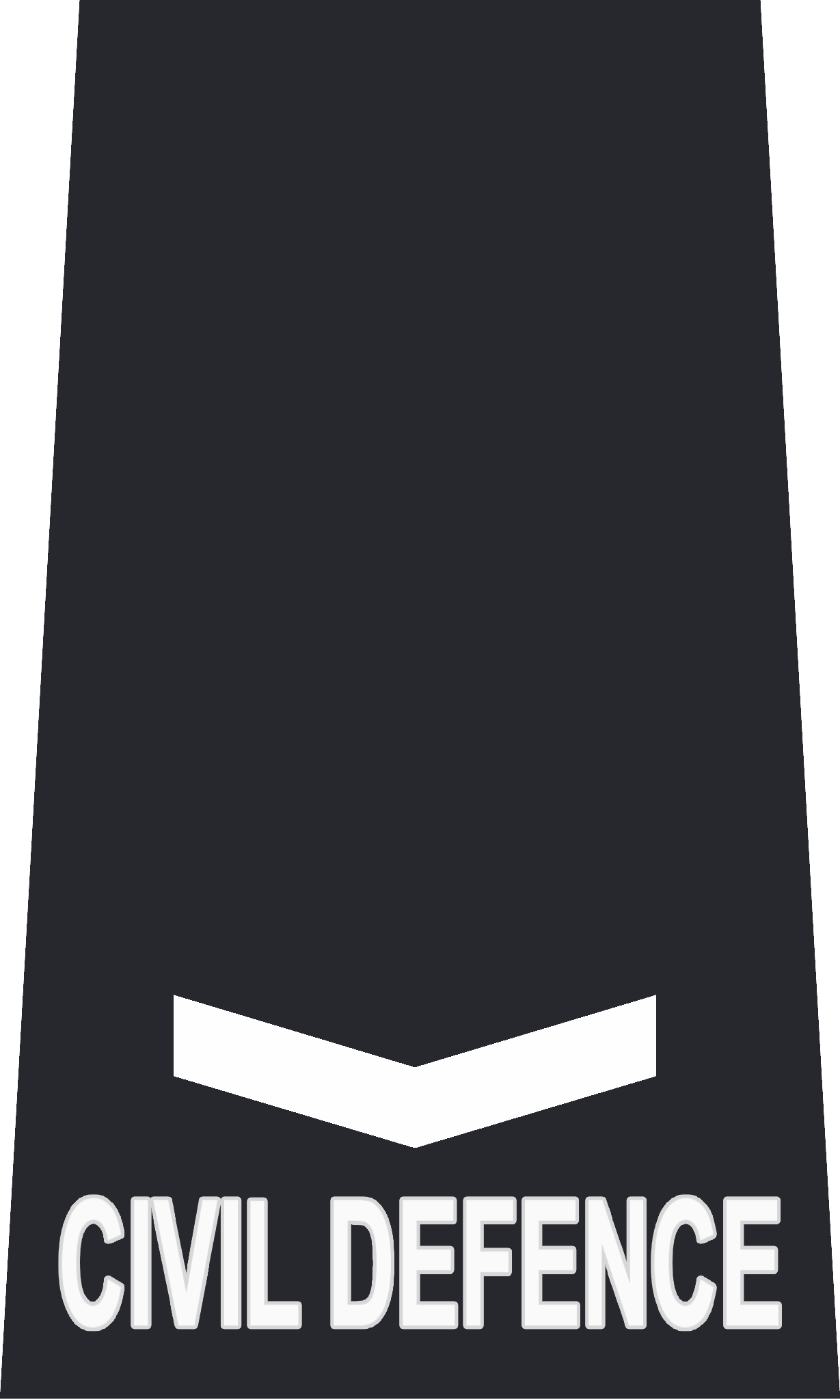
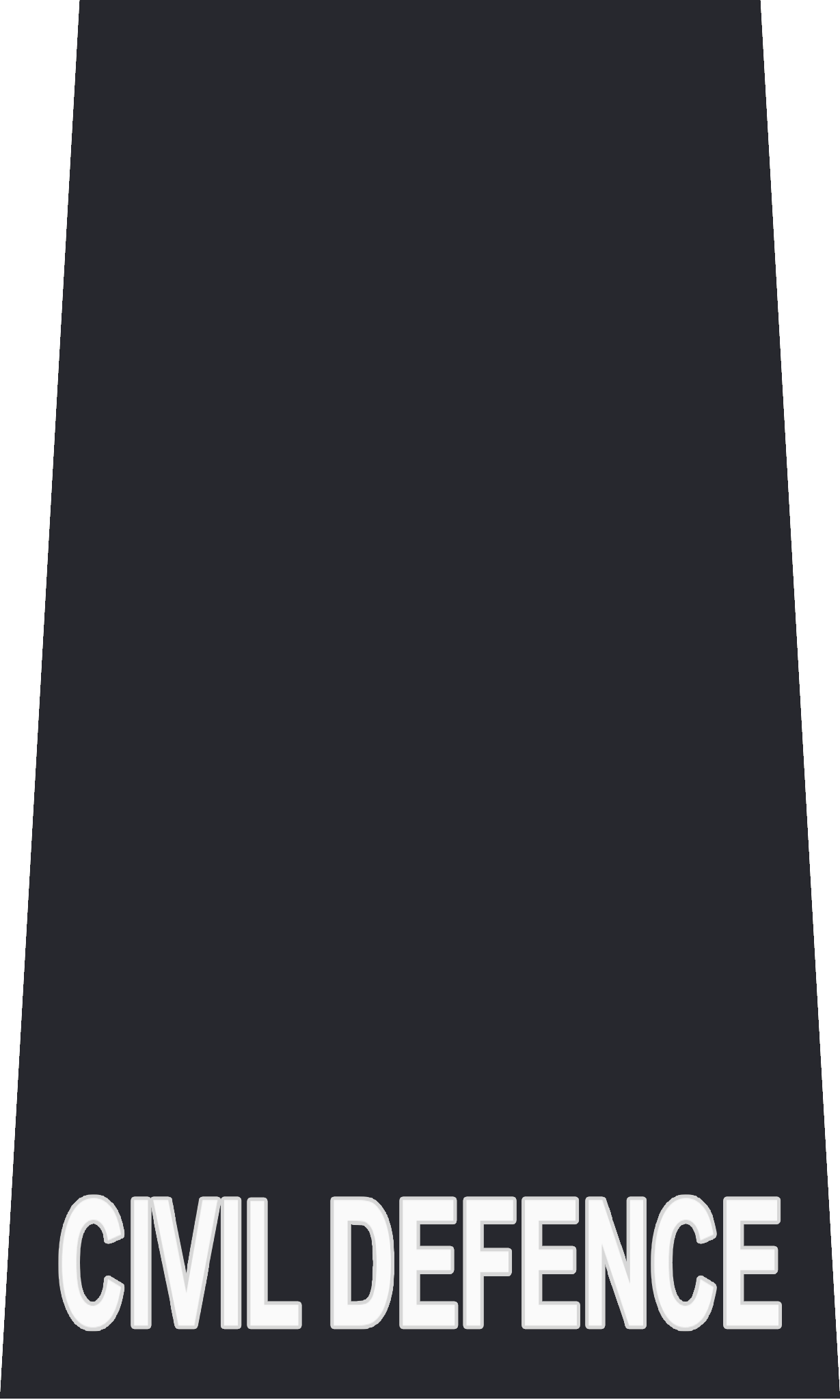
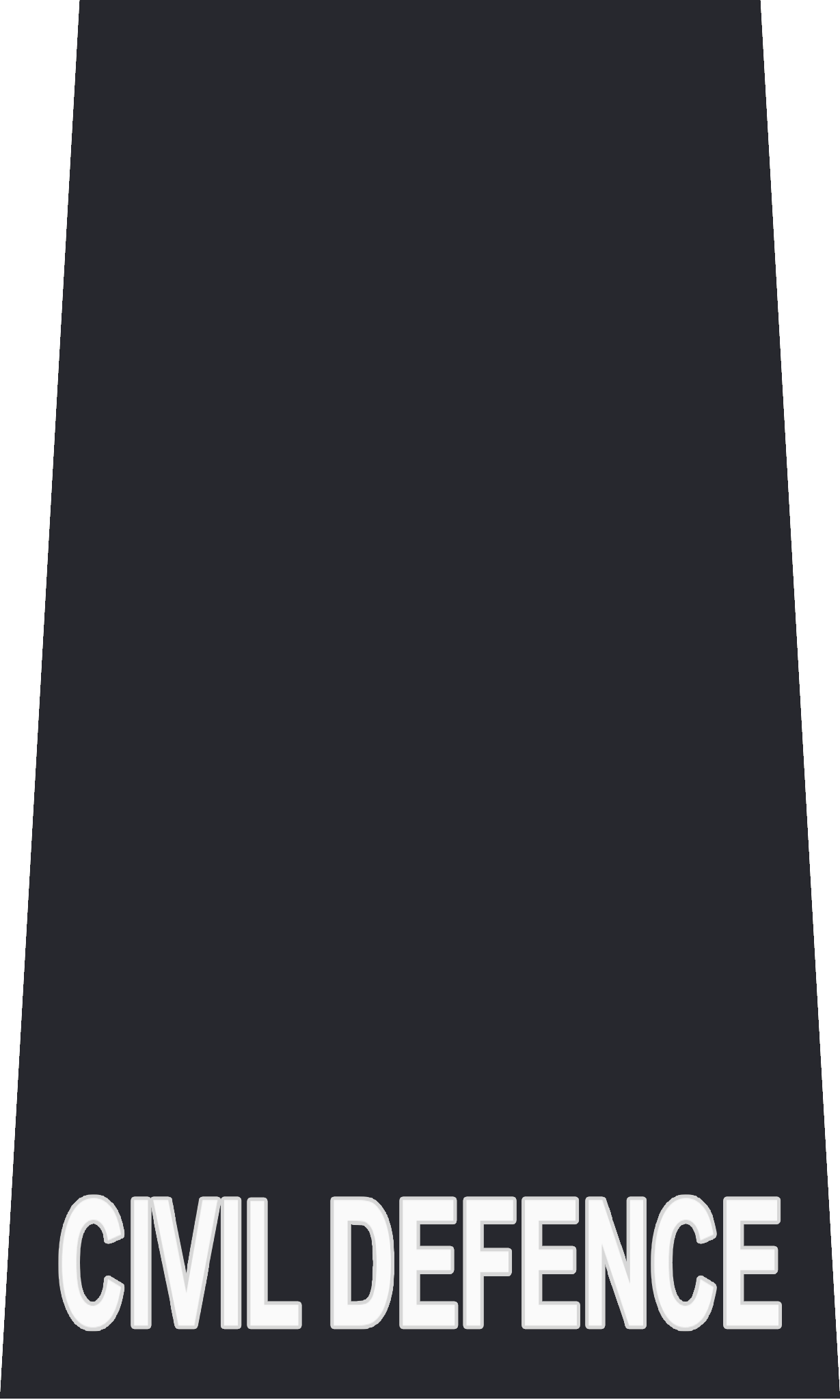
Rank group	Senior NCOs			Junior NCOs		Enlisted
Singapore Civil Defence Force
Singapore Civil Defence Force	Sergeant 3	Sergeant 2	Sergeant 1	Corporal	Lance corporal	Private	Recruit

== Spain ==
Spanish Civil Defence

Coordinador Jefe (Chief Coordinator)	Jefe de Agrupación (Grouping Chief)	Subjefe de Agrupación (Grouping Deputy Chief)	Secretario de Agrupación (Grouping Secretary)	Jefe de Unidad (Unit Chief)	Jefe de Sección (Section Chief)	Jefe de Grupo (Group Chief)	Jefe de Equipo (Team Chief)	Voluntario (Volunteer)

Military Emergencies Unit

Officers

NATO code	OF-10	OF-9	OF-8	OF-7	OF-6	OF-5	OF-4	OF-3	OF-2	OF-1
Military Emergencies Unit
Military Emergencies Unit				General de división	General de brigada	Coronel	Teniente coronel	Comandante	Capitán	Teniente	Alférez

Other Ranks

NATO code	OR-9		OR-8	OR-7	OR-6	OR-5	OR-4	OR-3	OR-2	OR-1
(Spain) Military Emergencies Unit
(Spain) Military Emergencies Unit	Suboficial mayor	Subteniente	Brigada	Sargento primero	Sargento	Cabo mayor	Cabo primero	Cabo	Soldado de primera	Soldado

== Switzerland ==
Function	Rank	Rank insignia
Civil Defence Commander	Oberst, Oberstleutnant, Major or Hauptmann	Oberst, Oberstleutnant, Major Hauptmann, Oberleutnant
Deputy Civil Defence Commander	Major, Hauptmann or Oberleutnant	Oberst, Oberstleutnant, Major Hauptmann, Oberleutnant
Head Damage Conditions Head Telematics Head NBC Protection, Head Logistic Coordination Head Cultural Property Protection Platoon Leader Welfare Platoon Leader Support	Leutnant Promotion to Oberleutnant possible	Leutnant
Chief Logistic Element	Feldweibel	Feldweibel
Accounting and Budgeting Officer	Fourier	Fourier
Squad Leader Telematics Squad Leader Welfare Squad Leader Medical Squad Leader Support Kitchen Manager	Korporal Promotion to Wachtmeister possible	Korporal
Controller Polycom-Dispatcher NBC-Tracker Radiation Protection Expert Psychological Emergency Aid Medical Orderly Facility Technician Materiel Technician Cultural Property Protection Specialist Command Support Aid Welfare Aid Sapper	Zivilschutzsoldat Promotion to Gefreiter possible	Soldat

== Tunisia ==
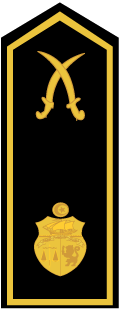
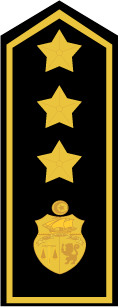
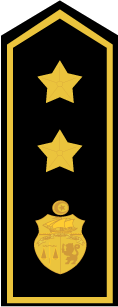
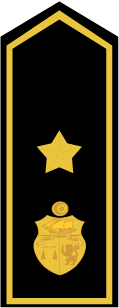
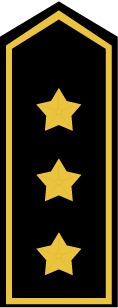
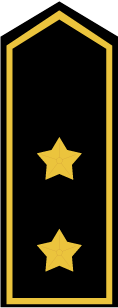
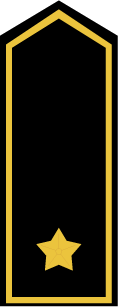
Officers
Field Officers				Junior Officers
Colonel-major	Colonel	Lieutenant-colonel	Commandant	Capitaine	Lieutenant	Sous-lieutenant
Arabic: عميد	Arabic: عقيد	Arabic: مقدم	Arabic: رائد	Arabic: نقيب	Arabic: ملازم أول	Arabic: ملازم

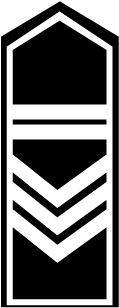
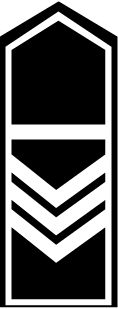
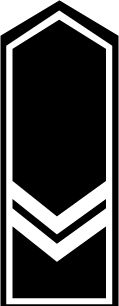
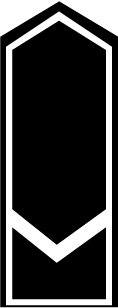
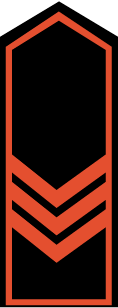
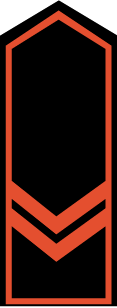
Sous-officiers et militaires du rang
NCO				Enlisted
Adjudant-chef	Adjudant	Sergent-chef	Sergent	Caporal-chef	Caporal
Arabic: وكيل أول	Arabic: وكيل	Arabic: عريف أول	Arabic: عريف	Arabic: رقيب أول	Arabic: رقيب

== Ukraine ==
State Emergency Service of Ukraine

Rank group	General / flag officers				Senior officers			Junior officers
	Генерал служби цивільного захисту України; General of Emergency Services	Генерал-полковник; Colonel General	Генерал-лейтенант; Lieutenant General	Генерал-майор; Major General	Полковник; Colonel	Підполковник; Lieutenant Colonel	Майор; Major	Капітан; Kapitan	Старший лейтенант Senior lieutenant	Лейтенант; Leitenant	Молодший лейтенант Junior lieutenant	Kурсант; Kursant

Rank group	Senior NCOs		Junior NCOs	Enlisted
	Головний майстер-сержант Chief master sergeant	Майстер-сержант; Master sergeant	Сержант; Sergeant	Рядовий; Private

== United Kingdom ==
Civil Defence Corps 1949–1968

Rank Insignia	Intelligence & Operations Sub-Section	Signal Sub-Section	Scientific & Recce Sub-Section	Warden Section	Rescue Section	Welfare Section	Ambulance Sub-Section	First Aid Sub-Section
	Division Chief Officer			Chief Warden	Chief Rescue Officer	Chief Welfare Section Officer	Chief Ambulance Officer	
	Senior Staff Officer	Senior Signal Officer	Senior Scientific Intelligence Officer	Deputy Chief Warden	Deputy Chief Rescue Officer	Deputy Chief Welfare Section Officer	Deputy Chief Ambulance Officer	
					Column Rescue Officer		Column Ambulance Officer	
				Assistant Chief Warden	Deputy Column Rescue Officer		Deputy Column Ambulance Officer	
	Staff Officer (Operations); Staff Officer (Intelligence); Sector Staff Officer	Signal Officer	Scientific Intelligence Officer; Reconnaissance Officer	Sector Warden	Company Rescue Officer	Assistant Chief Welfare Section Officer	Company Ambulance Officer	Company First Aid Officer
				Deputy Sector Warden	Deputy Company Rescue Officer	Senior Welfare Section Officer	Deputy Company Ambulance Officer	Deputy Company First Aid Officer
				Post Warden	Platoon Rescue Officer		Platoon Ambulance Officer	Platoon First Aid Officer
		Signalmaster		Deputy Post Warden	Deputy Platoon Rescue Officer	Welfare Section Officer	Deputy Platoon Ambulance Officer	Deputy Platoon First Aid Officer
	Operations Clerk; Intelligence Clerk	Signal Clerk; Field Cable Party Leader	Reconnaissance Party Leader	Senior Warden	Rescue Party Leader	Welfare Section Detachment Leader	Ambulance Detachment Leader	First Aid Party Leader
					Deputy Rescue Party Leader		Deputy Ambulance Detachment Leader	Deputy First Aid Party Leader

Civil Defence Service 1935–1945

Insignia	Wardens' Service	First Aid	Rescue	Decontamination	Messenger
	Controller				
	Chief Warden	Medical Officer	Head of Rescue Service	Head of Decontamination Service	
	Deputy Chief Warden	Deputy Medical Officer	Deputy Head of Rescue Service	Deputy Head of Decontamination Service	
	Divisional Warden	Ambulance Officer	Staff Officer	Gas Identification Officer	Officer (Senior Grade)
	Staff Officer	Assistant Ambulance Officer	Assistant Staff Officer	Assistant Gas Identification Officer	Officer (Junior Grade)
	Officer (London)		Senior Rescue Officer		
	Post Warden (London)	Depot Superintendent	Depot Superintendent	Depot Superintendent	
	Head Warden	Deputy Depot Superintendent	Rescue Party Supervisor	Deputy Depot Superintendent	Officer
	Senior Warden	Shift Officer	Rescue Party Leader	Squad Leader	Officer

== Yugoslavia ==
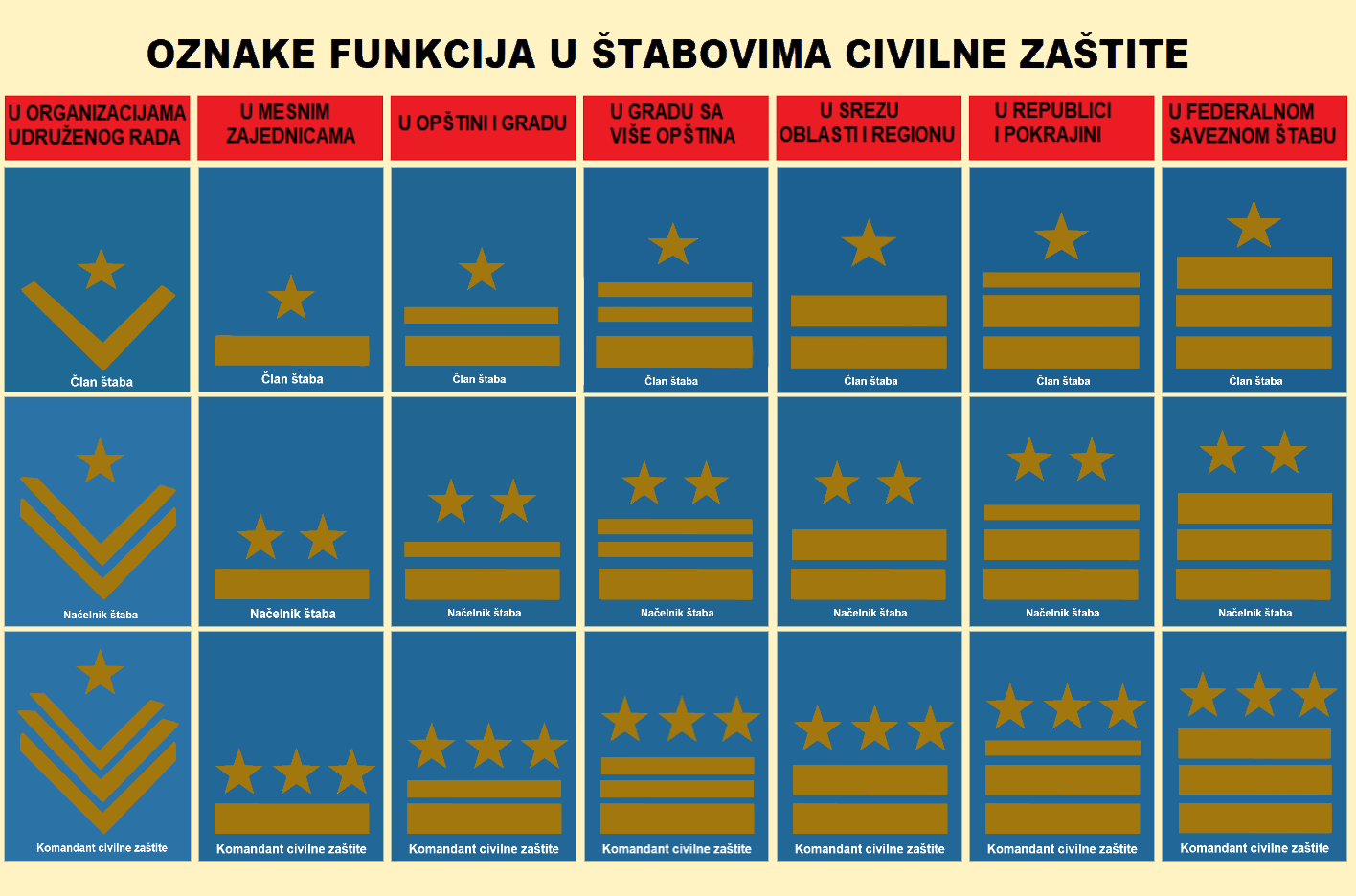
