= List of survivalism topics =

This is an outline of topics related to Survivalism.

Concepts

- Alternative food
- Alternative lifestyle
- American Redoubt
- CD3WD library
- Ersatz good
- Intentional community
- Intonjutsu
- Living off the land
- New Tribalism
- Off-the-grid
- Resilience (organizational)
- Risks to civilization, humans, and planet Earth
- Survival skills
- Shanty town
- Tent city
- Urban farms
- Urban resilience

Communication & navigation

- 2182 kHz
- 24-hour clock
- 24-hour analog dial
- Amateur radio
- Citizens band radio
- EPIRB
- Family Radio Service
- General Mobile Radio Service
- GPS tracker
- Military time zone
- Multi-Use Radio Service
- Radio silence
- Satellite phone
- Scanner (radio)
- Survival radio
- Wireless mesh network

Tools, technologies and equipment etc

- Air-raid shelter
- Bug-out bag
- First aid or Wilderness first aid
- Gasifier
- HHO generator
- Microturbine
- Night-vision device
- Pulsejet
- Standby generator
- Thermal imager

Vehicles, aircraft, watercraft, transport etc

- Bug-out vehicle
- Rogallo wing
- Homebuilt aircraft
- Jetboat
- Personal water craft
- Pontoon boat
- River barge
- Rhino ferry
- Rigid buoyant boat
- Inflatable dinghy
- Homebuilt gyrocopter
- Norry

Authors & publishers

- Jerry Ahern
- Bruce Clayton
- Claire Wolfe
- Hans von Dach
- Hilaire du Berrier
- William R. Forstchen
- Pat Frank
- Dean Ing
- Primitive technology
- Cody Lundin
- Ion Idriess
- Jerry Pournelle
- James Wesley Rawles
- Joel Skousen
- Joost Meerloo
- Les Hiddins
- Natori Masatake
- Paladin Press
- Rex Applegate
- Robert K. Brown
- Robert Rogers
- William E. Fairbairn
- S. M. Stirling
- Mel Tappan
- Lofty Wiseman

Media

- 10 Ways to End the World
- Alas, Babylon (1959)
- Doomsday Preppers
- Fire Brats
- It Can't Happen Here
- Shadow on the Land
- Twilight: 2000
- Tomorrow series

Manuals etc

- Bansenshūkai
- Nuclear War Survival Skills
- The Outdoor Survival Handbook
- Ray Mears' World of Survival
- Shōninki
- The SAS Survival Handbook
- The Survival Handbook
- Worst-Case Scenario series

Organizations

- Civiele Bescherming
- B-FAST
- Civil defense
- Clandestine cell system
- Federal Emergency Management Agency
- Operation Gladio
- Projekt-26
- SDRA8 and STC/Mob
- State Emergency Service
- Stay-behind
- The American Civil Defense Association
