= U&Dave =

British digital television channel owned by UKTV

- Logo used since 2024
- Broadcast area: United Kingdom; Ireland; Isle of Man; Channel Islands

Programming
- Language: English
- Picture format: 1080i HDTV (SDTV feed downscaled to 16:9 576i)
- Timeshift service: U&DaveJaVu (formerly Dave +1 and Dave ja vu)

Ownership
- Owner: BBC Studios
- Parent: UKTV
- Sister channels: U&Alibi; U&Drama; U&Eden; U&Gold; U&W; U&Yesterday

History
- Launched: 2 October 1998; 28 years ago
- Replaced: UKTV Bright Ideas (Freeview)
- Former names: UK Gold Classics (1998–1999); UK Gold 2 (1999–2003); UK G² (2003–2004); UKTV G2 (2004–2007); Dave (2007–2024)

Links
- Website: u.co.uk/channel/dave

Availability

Terrestrial
- Freeview: Channel 19; Channel 74 (JaVu)

Streaming media
- U: Stream Free (UK and Ireland only)
- Sky Go: Watch live (UK and Ireland only)
- Virgin TV Go: Watch live (UK only); Watch live (+1) (UK only)
- Virgin TV Anywhere: Watch live (Ireland only)

U&Dave is a British free-to-air television channel owned by UKTV, a subsidiary of BBC Studios. It is known for broadcasting modern comedy and factual programming, with both original production and repeats.

Launched in October 1998 as UK Gold Classics, the channel would undergo various identity and format changes before adopting the Dave branding on 15 October 2007. It was renamed U&Dave in July 2024 to mark the streaming service UKTV Play being renamed as U.

U&DaveJaVu is its sister timeshift channel. Unlike other commercial channels, it doesn't have a "+1" next to it and is named after the term déjà vu.

== History ==
=== UK Gold Classics and UK Gold 2 (1998–2003) ===
UK Gold Classics was UKTV's first digital-only channel. It was launched on 2 October 1998, and was only broadcast from Friday to Sunday on Sky Digital from 6.00pm to 2.00am. Around this time, UK Gold began to move away from older programmes and towards newer ones. Their 'classics' line-up included a number of early shows, and some black-and-white programmes, which had been acquired in the early years of the UK Gold service. While Gold Classics showed some recent shows from the main Gold channel, its main purpose was older shows from the early years of UK Gold. On weekdays, the channel was off air, showing a still caption of all the UKTV channels and start-up times.

Some of the programmes that aired on UK Gold Classics were a repeat run of the ITV comedy series Oh No It's Selwyn Froggitt, BBC comedy series Open All Hours, BBC soap opera EastEnders, ITV police drama series The Bill, and ITV comedy series Gingerbread Girl. Some of UK Gold's original commissioned programming that were recently aired on the main channel at the time (Wow-fab-Groovy, Tellystack, Sports Anorak of the Year, stand-up comedy show Live at Jongleurs, Rowland Rivron Bites The Bullet and music show Gold Goes Pop) also received airings on Gold Classics

The 'Classics' format lasted just six months; ending on 28 March 1999. The following day, UKTV announced that the channel would be relaunched as UK Gold 2 from 2 April 1999, and eventually expand its broadcast hours. UK Gold 2 essentially functioned as a secondary timeshift service, with the channel screening UK Gold's programmes from the morning of that day. On 24 May 1999, it was officially announced that the channel would start broadcasting daily from 1 June.

On 11 February 2002, UK Gold 2's downtime within the day became home to UK Style +. On 29 May, the channel launched on NTL. and eventually on Telewest. On 1 August, the channel moved from 110 to 111 on the Sky EPG, to make room for UK Gold +1, which launched that day. In July 2003, UK Style + vacated the downtime slot used by UK Gold 2 and extended its broadcast hours.

==== UK G² and UKTV G2 (2003–2007) ====
On 28 October 2003, it was announced that UK Gold 2 would be relaunched and rebranded as UK G2 (stylized as UK G²) on 12 November. UK G2 was promoted as being an edgier alternative to UK Gold; airing programmes aimed at an 18-34 year-old youth audience. Some of the programmes that already aired on UK Gold moved to the new network, in addition to some programmes from Play UK (which had closed the year prior). The broadcast hours were also changed, with the channel now operating from 8:00pm to 5:00am.

On 8 March 2004, in-line with its sibling channels, the channel would adopt the full "UKTV" name, becoming UKTV G2. On 1 November, near the channel's first anniversary, a one-hour timeshift service, UKTV G2 +1, was launched on Sky and Telewest., broadcasting from 9:00pm to 4:00am.

On 7 October 2005, it was announced that UKTV G2 would pilot a sports programming block titled "UKTV Sport". The block would include a new show by the same name, as well as its own logo and digital on-screen graphic. The block was planned to be a pilot for a dedicated TV channel of the same name, which never came into fruition.

==== Expansion of broadcast hours and addition of live sports (2006–2007) ====
On 10 December 2005, UKTV announced that UKTV G2 would expand broadcast hours to the daytime and begin operations at 9:00am beginning on 16 January 2006. The expansion of hours was to prepare for the full launch of the UKTV Sport strand, which would fill out some of the daytime hours during sports events. Standard programmes featured included pre-watershed comedy programmes already seen on the channel, alongside the addition of popular-factual and magazine shows which were already running on UKTV People, such as Top Gear and Airport. The extended hours did not apply to UKTV G2 +1, which remained an evening-only service.

In February 2006, UKTV obtained the rights to show highlights of the Six Nations rugby union championship, with a highlights show broadcast on the evening of the games previously shown live on the BBC. On 16 March 2006, they announced a deal to air extensive coverage of the 2006 FIFA World Cup as a sub-licensing of the BBC's rights to the tournament. UKTV G2 simulcast the BBC's live matches, including the opening match between Germany and Costa Rica, England's game with Paraguay and the final. The channel also showed highlights of every match in the tournament.

In April 2006, the channel acquired the rights to the quarter-finals of the EuroLeague Basketball and in August, UKTV G2 also picked up rights to the 2006 FIBA World Championship, forming the programme 'UKTV Slam'.

=== Rebranding as Dave (2007-2022) ===
Dave logo used from 2007 to 2022

In August 2007, UKTV announced they were considering adding a planned relaunch of UKTV G2 to the digital terrestrial platform Freeview, replacing UKTV Bright Ideas.

On 20 September 2007, UKTV officially announced that the relaunch of UKTV G2 would be called Dave, scheduled for 15 October, with the channel joining Freeview on the same day. The channel's name was chosen with UKTV stating that "everyone knows a bloke called Dave".

The name has been reported to have originated from a suggestion made during early branding discussions by a technical adviser seconded from Virgin Media to assist UKTV with streaming and digital strategy. The suggestion was inspired by an anecdote in which several colleagues shared the same name, prompting the observation that “everyone knows a Dave”, and reinforcing the intention for the name to convey familiarity and ordinariness rather than reference any specific individual.

To prepare for the launch, UKTV Bright Ideas was shut down permanently, with UKTV History taking over its timesharing bandwidth with Virgin1, while Dave would launch in UKTV History's former Freeview bandwidth.

To ensure that all Freeview viewers received Dave on channel number 19, UKTV briefly placed a re-tuning notice on the programme's information. The timeshift service UKTV G2 +1 was effectively renamed Dave +1 and expanded its own broadcast hours to match its parent network.

Dave used the tagline "the home of witty banter", and had Ralph Ineson as an announcer; along with David Flynn, Phill Jupitus, Iain Lee and BBC Radio 1 DJ Greg James.

On 31 January 2008, the channel began broadcasting in widescreen, along with the other UKTV channels.

The current logo of the timeshift channel

On 22 January 2009, following UKTV's acquisition of a further Freeview broadcast slot, Dave +1 was made available on the digital terrestrial platform. Dave +1 would be renamed Dave ja vu (a play on the phrase déjà vu) on 24 February, in order to "strengthen the brand's positioning as the home of witty banter" according to UKTV bosses. In April 2009, they aired three new instalments of Red Dwarf, entitled Back to Earth. This marked the channel's first foray into scripted original programming. During the airing of the Red Dwarf mini-series, the Dave DOG in the top left corner of the screen had the word 'Lister' added after it in the same font, after the show's lead character; during the special it is even suggested that the station is named after him. Back to Earth brought record breaking viewing figures, not just in the context of the channel's past, but for digital television in general. Subsequently, three full series of Red Dwarf have been produced for Dave which aired in 2012, 2016 and 2017, along with a feature-length special in 2020. In June 2009, the logo was updated to incorporate the 'circle' logo branding of all the new UKTV channels. At the same time, the voice of Dave became Nigel Grover, aka Scott Saunders, who had previously worked at a number of local radio stations.

On 14 June 2011, UKTV announced that Really would launch on Freeview on 2 August 2011. To facilitate this, Dave ja vu's broadcast hours on the platform were reduced from 8.00 am-4.00 am to 2.00 am-4.00 am in order to keep the space for future use. On 29 July 2011, UKTV announced that it had secured a deal with BSkyB to launch three more high-definition channels on Sky UK. As part of Virgin Media's deal to sell its share of UKTV, all five of UKTV's HD channels would also be added to Virgin's cable television service by 2012.

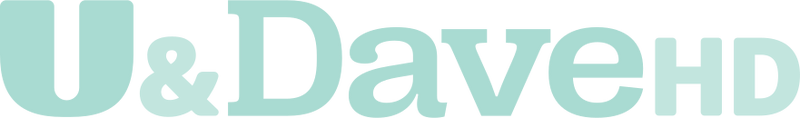
The current logo for the HD channel

Dave HD launched on 10 October 2011 on Sky and Virgin Media, two days before Watch HD, while Alibi HD launched in July 2012. All three channels are HD simulcasts of the standard-definition channel.

In September 2012, the channel swapped its Freeview EPG number with Yesterday, moving to channel 12. On 22 November 2012, UKTV confirmed that it had secured a deal for another 24-hour DTT slot and would use it for Dave ja vu until it firmed up permanent plans for the slot. Dave ja vu began to broadcast its full schedule on the platform again from 3 January 2013. Drama permanently took the slot from 8 July 2013, however Dave ja vu continued to broadcast between 2.00 am-5.00 am.

On 29 April 2014, the 'circle' logo was removed and the original 2007 logo was restored, also updating the idents. On 20 November, Dave ja vu returned to 24-hour broadcasting on Freeview.

Dave HD along with Good Food HD and Eden HD launched on BT TV on 3 October 2016.

In June 2019, Dave moved back to channel 19 on Freeview, a space previously occupied by Yesterday. This was following owner BBC Studios breaking up its joint venture with Discovery, Inc., with Discovery acquiring Good Food, Home and Really.

In November 2020, following UKTV's purchase of CCXTV, Dave ja vu moved to channel 23, whilst CCXTV moved to Freeview 73.

After the relaunch of BBC Three (and with BBC Four in Scotland taking the next slot), Dave ja vu moved down to channel 25. This lasted until March 2022, when UKTV revealed that Dave would be going back to the 70s section on the Freeview EPG, as the channel number was used by UKTV for their female-skewing W channel. From 28 March 2022, Dave Ja Vu took Drama+1's slot on Freeview 74, with that one-hour timeshift of Drama moving up to channel 60.

=== 2022–2024 ===
Dave logo used from 2022 to 2024

On 9 November 2022, Dave was given an on-air refresh, including a new logo, idents, and a new slogan ("Add a bit of Dave").

On 16 July 2024, the channel was rebranded as U&Dave, as part of the realignment of UKTV's free-to-air networks under the new "U" masterbrand.

== Reception ==
Within just one month of its launch, Dave was the tenth most viewed television channel in the UK. In November 2007, the broadcaster listed daily viewing averages at around 3 million viewers, although, much of the growth was attributed to its presence on Freeview; nonetheless, it was performing significantly better in pay TV homes than UKTV G2. Over the month since its launch, Dave averaged a 1.32% share in multichannel homes and a 3.2% share in the 16–34 male demographic.

Dave received 4 million viewers throughout 18 November 2007 for its coverage of "Car of the Year", pushing it to second place in multichannel behind ITV2.

The first episode of Red Dwarf: Back to Earth attracted 2,060,000 viewers on the first viewing, though over 4 million viewed the episode at some point over its debut weekend. The highest rating original commission before this had been Red Bull X-Fighters (about 185,000).

== Programming ==
=== Current 'Made for Dave' UKTV Originals ===
| Name of show | Original run |
|---|---|
| Alan Davies: As Yet Untitled | 2014–2023 |
| Battle in the Box | 2024 |
| Big Zuu's Big Eats | 2020–2023 |
| Borderforce: America's Gatekeepers | 2018–present |
| British As Folk | 2021 |
| Cop Car Workshop | 2018–present |
| Guy Martin: Proper Jobs | 2025–present |
| The Hurting | 2017–present |
| The Island | 2022 |
| The Joy of Techs | 2017 |
| Mel Giedroyc: Unforgivable | 2021–2024 |
| Red Bull Soapbox Race | 2013 –present |
| Silence Is Golden | 2025 |
| Sneakerhead | 2022 |
| Special Ops: Crime Squad UK | 2022–present |
| Used Car Wars | 2017 |
| Will & Ralf Should Know Better | 2024–present |

=== Previous 'Made for Dave' UKTV Originals ===
| Name of show | Original run |
|---|---|
| 24 Hours to Go Broke | 2014 |
| Beat the Internet with John Robins | 2018–2019 |
| Comedians Giving Lectures | 2019–2022 |
| Comedy Against Living Miserably | 2020–2021 |
| Crackanory | 2013–2017 |
| Dave's Advent Calendar | 2018 |
| Dave Gorman: Terms and Conditions Apply | 2019 |
| Dead Canny | 2022 |
| Expedition with Steve Backshall | 2019–2022 |
| Hoff the Record | 2015–2016 |
| Holier Than Thou | 2022 |
| Hypothetical | 2019–2022 |
| Jon Richardson: Ultimate Worrier | 2018–2019 |
| Judge Romesh | 2018–2019 |
| Just Jokes | 2022 |
| Late Night Mash | BBC Two 2017–2020 (as The Mash Report); Dave 2021–2022 |
| Live At The Moth Club | 2022 |
| Meet the Richardsons | 2020–2024 |
| The Other Half | 2022 |
| Outsiders | 2021–2023 |
| Perfect | 2022 |
| Porters | 2017–2019 |
| Question Team | 2021–2022 |
| Red Dwarf | BBC Two 1988–1999; Dave 2009–2020 |
| Red Dwarf: The First Three Million Years | 2020 |
| Ronnie's Redneck Road Trip | 2017 |
| Rosie Jones's Disability Comedy Extravaganza | 2022–2024 |
| Ross Noble: Freewheeling | 2013–2015 |
| Sliced | 2019–2021 |
| Storage Hunters UK | 2014–2016 |
| Taskmaster | 2015–2019; Channel 4 2020–present |
| Undercover | 2015 |
| Unspun with Matt Forde | 2016–2018 |
| We Are Not Alone | 2022 |
| Zapped | 2016–2018 |

=== Current reruns and imports ===
| Name of show | Original channel(s) | Original run |
|---|---|---|
| 8 Out of 10 Cats | Channel 4 More4; E4 | 2005–2021 |
| American Pickers | History (United States) | 2010–present |
| Animal Kingdom | TNT (United States) | 2016–2022 |
| Australian Ninja Warrior | Nine Network (Australia) | 2017–2022 |
| Beverly Hills Pawn | Reelz (United States) | 2013 |
| The Boat That Guy Built | BBC One | 2011 |
| Cops UK: Bodycam Squad | Really | 2016–2017 |
| David Beckham: For the Love of the Game | BBC One | 2015 |
| Deadly 60 | BBC One; BBC Two; CBBC | 2009–2012 |
| Deadly 60 on a Mission | BBC One; BBC Two; CBBC | 2011–2013 |
| Extreme Fishing with Robson Green | Channel 5 | 2008–2011 |
| Famalam | BBC Three | 2017–2020 |
| Flip Men | Spike (United States) | 2011–2012 |
| Future Man | Hulu (United States) | 2017–2020 |
| Gino's Italian Escape | ITV | 2013–2020 |
| Guy Martin's Battle of Britain | Channel 4 | 2001 |
| Guy Martin's Spitfire | Channel 4 | 2014 |
| Guy Martin's Great British Power Trip | Channel 4 | 2023 |
| Hairy Bikers' Best of British | BBC Two | 2011–2013 |
| Hairy Bikers Everyday Gourmets | BBC Two | 2013 |
| Have I Got News for You | BBC Two; BBC One | 1990–present |
| Ice Road Truckers | History (United States) | 2007–2017 |
| Impossible Engineering | Yesterday | 2015–present |
| The Indestructibles | BBC Three | 2006 |
| Insert Name Here | BBC Two | 2016–2019 |
| Into The Fire | Really | 2018–present |
| Ireland with Simon Reeve | BBC Two | 2015 |
| Jay Leno's Garage | CNBC (United States) | 2015–2022 |
| Josh | BBC Three; BBC One | 2014–2017 |
| The Lakes with Simon Reeve | BBC Two | 2021 |
| The Last Man on Earth | Fox (United States) | 2015–2018 |
| Live at the Apollo | BBC One; BBC Two | 2004–present |
| Lizard Lick Towing | truTV (United States) | 2011–2017 |
| Magnum P.I. | CBS and NBC (United States) | 2018-2024 |
| MegaTruckers | A&E (Australia) | 2012–2013 |
| Mike | Hulu (United States) | 2022 |
| Mock the Week | BBC Two; TLC | 2005–present |
| Mortimer & Whitehouse: Gone Fishing | BBC Two | 2018–present |
| Not Going Out | BBC One | 2006–present |
| Only Connect | BBC Four; BBC Two | 2008–present |
| Our Guy in Russia | Channel 4 | 2018 |
| Parks and Recreation | NBC (United States) | 2009–2015 |
| Prison Break | FOX (United States) | 2005–2017 |
| Pointless | BBC Two; BBC One | 2009–present |
| QI | BBC Four; BBC Two; BBC One | 2003–present |
| Richard Osman's House of Games | BBC Two | 2017–present |
| Rick Stein's Mediterranean Escapes | BBC Two | 2007 |
| Rick Stein: From Venice to Istanbul | BBC Two | 2015 |
| Rick Stein's Cornwall | BBC Two | 2021–2023 |
| Red Bull Soapbox Race | Discovery Channel (United States) | 2013–present |
| Robson Green's Weekend Escapes | BBC Two | 2023–present |
| Rocket City Rednecks | National Geographic Channel (United States) | 2011–2013 |
| Room 101 | BBC Two; BBC One | 1994–2018 |
| Russell Howard's Good News | BBC Three; BBC Two | 2009–2015 |
| Schitt’s Creek | CBC (Canada) | 2015–2020 |
| Scrappers | BBC One | 2014 |
| Seal Team | CBS | 2017-2024 |
| The Shield | FX (United States) | 2002–2008 |
| Sons Of Anarchy | FX (United States) | 2008–2014 |
| Stephen Fry's 100 Greatest Gadgets | Channel 4 | 2011 |
| Steve Austin's Broken Skull Challenge | CMT (United States) | 2014–2017 |
| Storage Hunters | TruTV (United States) | 2011–2013 |
| Survivor South Africa | M-Net | 2006–2022 |
| This Country | BBC Three | 2017–2020 |
| Top Gear | BBC Two; BBC One | 2002–2022 |
| Traffic Cops | BBC One; BBC Three; Channel 5 | 2003–present |
| Travel Man | Channel 4 | 2015–present |
| Trawlermen | BBC One | 2006–2010 |
| Two Pints of Lager and a Packet of Crisps | BBC Two; BBC Choice; BBC Three | 2001–2011 |
| Whose Line Is It Anyway? | ABC (United States); ABC Family (United States); The CW (United States) | 1998–2024 |
| World's Most Dangerous Roads | BBC Two | 2011–2013 |
| The Weakest Link | BBC Two; BBC One | 2000–present |
| Would I Lie To You? | BBC One | 2007–present |
| You Gotta Eat Here! | Food Network (Canada) | 2012–2016 |

=== Sport ===
From 2008 to 2010, Dave showed highlights of the World Rally Championship.

On 6 January 2016, UKTV announced that Dave would show its first-ever live sporting event with a boxing match between David Haye and Mark de Mori at the O2 Arena on 16 January 2016 produced by Salter Brothers Entertainment.

In late May 2016, Dave broadcast full live coverage of the 2016 BDO World Trophy darts tournament.

In July 2016, Dave covered cricket's Caribbean Premier League. It broadcast five matches live, including the final and showed the other games in full on a delayed basis.

In 2017, Dave started broadcasting live MMA with promotion BAMMA.

=== Films ===
In its early years, Dave aired a mix of black-and-white films like The Lavender Hill Mob and 90s films like The Hudsucker Proxy.

In 2012, Dave introduced its 'film club' where a different film would be shown every week, including Barton Fink, City of God, The Big Lebowski, Resident Evil: Apocalypse, Taxi Driver, and Clerks to name a few.

In early 2016, Dave and Yesterday aired Western films during the daytime. From 2017, Dave mostly show films on Friday and Saturday nights, with Friday being a repeat of the film that was shown on a Saturday.

In 2019 and 2023, Dave showed a season of Quentin Tarantino movies.

=== Previous ===
| Name of show | Original channel(s) | Original run |
|---|---|---|
| 2point4 Children | BBC One | 1991–1999 |
| 10 Things You Don't Know About | H2 (United States) | 2012–2014 |
| 30 Years of Comic Strip | Gold | 2012 |
| Abandoned Engineering | Yesterday | 2016–2017 |
| Absolutely Fabulous | BBC Two; BBC One | 1992–2012 |
| Absolute Power | BBC Two | 2003–2005 |
| The Accidental Angler | BBC Two | 2006 |
| Ace of Cakes | Food Network (Canada) | 2006–2011 |
| Airport | BBC One; BBC Two | 1996–2008 |
| Al Murray's Barrel of Fun: Live | Dave | 2011 |
| Al Murray's Compete for the Meat | Dave | 2011 |
| Al Murray: A Glass Of White Wine For The Lady | Dave | 2010 |
| Al Murray: Giving It Both Barrels | Dave | 2010 |
| Al Murray: My Gaff, My Rules | Dave | 2010 |
| Al Murray The Pub Landlord: Beautiful British Tour Live At The O2 | Dave | 2010 |
| Al Murray The Pub Landlord: Live At The Palladium | Dave | 2010 |
| Alan Davies: Life is Pain | Dave | 2014 |
| Alan Davies' Teenage Revolution | Channel 4 | 2010 |
| Alexander Armstrong's Big Ask | Dave | 2011–2013 |
| Alison & Larry: Billericay To Barry | Gold | 2023 |
| All Creatures Great and Small | BBC One | 1978–1990 |
| Amazing Adventures of a Nobody | Sky Real Lives | 2006 |
| And Then You Die | Dave | 2007–2008 |
| The Apprentice | BBC Two; BBC One | 2005–present |
| Argumental | Dave | 2008–2012 |
| The Armstrong & Miller Show | BBC One | 2007–2010 |
| Arnie’s Greatest Ever Stunts | Dave | 2016 |
| Asian Provocateur | BBC Three | 2015–2016 |
| Bad Teacher | CBS (United States) | 2014 |
| BAMMA | Bravo; Syfy; Extreme Sports Channel; 5* Channel 5 AMC Networks (United States); Spike; Dave; ITV4 | 2009–2018 |
| Bang Goes the Theory | BBC One | 2009–2014 |
| Banzai | E4 | 2001–2003 |
| Batteries Not Included | Dave | 2008 |
| Baywatch | NBC (United States) | 1989–2001 |
| Big Train | BBC Two | 1998–2002 |
| The Bill | ITV | 1984–2010 |
| Billy Connolly's World Tour of Scotland | BBC One | 1994 |
| Billy Connolly's World Tour of Australia | BBC One | 1995 |
| Billy Connolly's World Tour of England, Ireland and Wales | BBC One | 2002 |
| Billy Connolly's World Tour of New Zealand | BBC One | 2004 |
| A Bit of Fry & Laurie | BBC One; BBC Two | 1989–1995 |
| Blackadder | BBC One | 1983–1989 |
| Blackadder Exclusive: The Whole Rotten Saga; Blackadder's Most Cunning Moments | Gold | 2008 |
| Black Books | Channel 4 | 2000–2004 |
| Blue Peter | BBC One; BBC Two; CBBC | 1958–present |
| Bottom | BBC Two | 1991–1995 |
| Bottom Live | Dave | 2008 |
| Bottom Live: The Big Number Two Tour | Dave | 2008 |
| Bottom Live 3: Hooligan's Island | Dave | 2008 |
| Bottom Live 2001: An Arse Oddity | Dave | 2008 |
| Bottom Live 2003: Weapons Grade Y-Fronts Tour | Dave | 2008 |
| Boxing: David Haye V Mark De Mori | Dave | 2016 |
| Breaking In | Fox (United States) | 2011–2012 |
| Brojects | Dave | 2014–2016 |
| Brojects: In the House | Dave | 2016–2017 |
| Bruce Parry's Amazon | BBC Two | 2008 |
| The Bruvs | Dave | 2017 |
| The Bubble | BBC Two | 2010 |
| Bush Pilots | Dave | 2011 |
| Car Duels | UKTV G2 | 2006 |
| Car of the Year | UKTV G2/Dave | 2004–2008 |
| Carpool | Dave/Online Series | 2010–2011 |
| The Catherine Tate Show | BBC Two; BBC One | 2004–2015 |
| Chandon Pictures | Movie Extra (Australia) | 2007–2009 |
| Charlie Brooker's Gameswipe | BBC Four | 2009 |
| Charlie Brooker's Newswipe | BBC Four | 2009–2010 |
| Charlie Brooker's Screenwipe | BBC Four | 2006–2008 |
| Chewin' the Fat | BBC One | 1999–2005 |
| Clarkson's Car Years | BBC Two | 2000 |
| Clocking Off | BBC One | 2000–2003 |
| Clive Anderson All Talk | BBC One | 1996–1999 |
| Comedy Connections | BBC One | 2003–2008 |
| Comedy Exchange | Dave | 2010 |
| The Comic Strip Presents... | Channel 4 BBC Two; Gold | 1982–2016 |
| Cooking in the Danger Zone | BBC Two | 2008 |
| The Cops | BBC Two | 1998–2001 |
| Coupling | BBC Two; BBC Three | 2000–2004 |
| Crash | Dave | 2009 |
| Crash Addicts | OLN (United States) | 2006–2007 |
| Cutting It | BBC One | 2002–2005 |
| Dallas | CBS (United States) | 1978–1991 |
| Dangerfield | BBC Two | 1995–1999 |
| Danny Bhoy Live | Dave | 2013 |
| Danny MacAskill's Imaginate | Dave | 2013 |
| Dara Ó Briain: School of Hard Sums | Dave | 2012–2014 |
| Dara O Briain's Go 8 Bit | Dave | 2016–2018 |
| Dave's One Night Stand | Dave | 2010–2012 |
| Dave Gorman: Goodish Hits | Dave | 2016 |
| Dave Gorman: Modern Life is Goodish | Dave | 2013–2025 |
| Davestation | Dave | 2013 |
| David Haye vs. Arnold Gjergjaj: The Countdown | Dave | 2016 |
| The Day Today | BBC Two | 1994 |
| Dead Ringers | BBC Two | 2002–2007 |
| Deadliest Pests Down Under | Dave | 2016 |
| Disaster House | DIY Network (United States) | 2009–present |
| Doctor Who | BBC One | 1963–present |
| Doctors | BBC One | 2000–2024 |
| Don't Say It... Bring It! | Dave | 2017 |
| Doubletake | BBC Two | 2001–2005 |
| Dragons’ Den | BBC Two | 2005–present |
| Dragons’ Den Canada | CBC Television (United States) | 2006–present |
| Dragons’ Den Ireland | RTÉ One | 2009–2017 |
| Driving Wars | Dave | 2011 |
| Dynamo: Magician Impossible | W | 2011–2014 |
| EastEnders | BBC One | 1985–present |
| Eat Your Heart Out with Nick Helm | Dave | 2017 |
| Eddie Izzard: Force Majeure | Dave | 2015 |
| Eldorado | BBC One | 1992–1993 |
| Everest ER | BBC One | 2009 |
| Extras | BBC Two; BBC One | 2005–2007 |
| Factory | Spike (United States) | 2008 |
| The Fast Show | BBC Two; Fosters Funny | 1994–2014 |
| Fawlty Towers | BBC Two; Fosters Funny | 1975–1979 |
| Fawlty Towers: Re-Opened; Fawlty Towers: Basil's Best Bits | Gold | 2009 |
| FC Dave | Dave | 2008 |
| Fifth Gear | Channel 5 Discovery (United States); History (United States); ITV4 | 2002–2016 |
| Filthy Rich & Catflap | BBC Two | 1987 |
| The Flying Doctors | Nine Network (Australia) | 1986–1993 |
| Football's 47 Best Worst Songs | Dave | 2018 |
| Frank Skinner – Stand-Up! Live from Birmingham's National Indoor Arena | Dave | 2008 |
| Frank Skinner's Opinionated | BBC Two | 2010–2011 |
| Friday Night with Jonathan Ross | BBC One | 2001–2010 |
| Full Circle with Michael Palin | BBC One | 1997 |
| Full Metal Challenge | Channel 4 | 2004–2007 |
| The Gadget Show | Channel 5 | 2004–2023 |
| Game of Arms | AMC (United States) | 2014 |
| Game On | BBC Two | 1995–1998 |
| Gavin & Stacey | BBC Three; BBC Two; BBC One | 2007–2024 |
| Gears and Tears | BBC One | 2010 |
| Genius | BBC Two | 2009–2010 |
| Ghosts | BBC One | 2019–2023 |
| The Gingerbread Girl | ITV | 1993 |
| The Good Life | BBC One | 1975–1978 |
| Greg Davies Live – Firing Cheeseballs at a Dog | Dave | 2011 |
| The Graham Norton Show | BBC Two; BBC One | 2007–present |
| Grange Hill | BBC One; CBBC | 1978–2008 |
| GT Racer | Treasure HD (United States) | 2008–2009 |
| Harbour Lights | BBC One | 1999–2000 |
| Hardliners | Fox8 (Australia) | 2010–2011 |
| Harry Enfield's Television Programme; Harry Enfield and Chums | BBC Two; BBC One | 1990–1998 |
| Harry Hill's TV Burp | ITV | 2001–2012 |
| Haye V De Mori: The Countdown | Dave | 2016 |
| HeadJam | BBC Three | 2004 |
| Heartbeat | ITV | 1992–2010 |
| Helicopter Heroes | BBC One | 2007–2015 |
| High Altitude | BBC Two | 2009 |
| Him & Her | BBC Three | 2010–2013 |
| Holby City | BBC One | 1999–2022 |
| Hole in the Wall | BBC One | 2008–2009 |
| The Horne Section Television Programme | Dave | 2018 |
| Hustle | BBC One | 2004–2012 |
| Hyperdrive | BBC Two | 2006–2007 |
| Ideal | BBC Three | 2005–2011 |
| Idris Elba: King of Speed | Dave | 2014 |
| I'm Alan Partridge | BBC Two | 1997–2002 |
| Impossible Railways | Yesterday | 2018–present |
| The Impressions Show with Culshaw and Stephenson | BBC One | 2009–2011 |
| Improvisation My Dear Mark Watson (Pilot) | Dave | 2011 |
| India with Sanjeev Bhaskar | BBC Two | 2007–2010 |
| Is It Bill Bailey? | BBC Two | 1998 |
| It's Only TV...but I Like It | BBC One | 1999–2002 |
| James May's 20th Century | BBC Two | 2007 |
| James May's Big Ideas | BBC Two | 2008 |
| James May's Cars of the People | BBC Two | 2014–2016 |
| James May on the Moon | BBC Two | 2009 |
| James May's Toy Stories | BBC Two | 2009–2011 |
| James May's Top Toys | BBC Two | 2005 |
| Jeremy Clarkson: Meets the Neighbours | BBC Two | 2002 |
| Jeremy Clarkson's Extreme Machines | BBC Two | 1998 |
| Jeremy Clarkson's Motorworld | BBC Two | 1995–1996 |
| Jo Brand's Big Splash | Dave | 2011 |
| Jo Brand's Great Wall of Comedy | Gold | 2013 |
| John Bishop: In Conversation With... | W | 2016–2019 |
| Juliet Bravo | BBC One | 1980–1985 |
| The Keith Barret Show | BBC Two | 2004–2005 |
| Knots Landing | CBS (United States) | 1979–1993 |
| Knowing Me Knowing You with Alan Partridge | BBC Two | 1994–1995 |
| Kröd Mändoon and the Flaming Sword of Fire | BBC Two | 2009 |
| The Kumars at No. 42 | BBC Two; BBC One; Sky 1 | 2001–2014 |
| The Lakes | BBC One | 1997–1999 |
| Last Man Standing | BBC Three | 2007–2008 |
| Later... with Jools Holland | BBC Two | 1992–present |
| Law & Order | NBC (United States) | 1990–present |
| Lead Balloon | BBC Four; BBC Two | 2006–2011 |
| The League of Gentlemen | BBC Two | 1999–2017 |
| Lenny Henry's Race Through Comedy | Gold | 2019 |
| Lee Mack Live | Dave | 2007 |
| A Life of Grime | BBC One | 1999–2004 |
| Little Britain | BBC Three; BBC One | 2003–2007 |
| Live at Jongleurs | ITV | 1997–2000 |
| Live Boxing: David Haye v Arnold Gjergjaj | Dave | 2016 |
| Live Boxing: Hayemaker Ringstar Fight Night | Dave | 2017 |
| Live Boxing: Hayemaker Ringstar Fight Night 2 | Dave | 2017 |
| Live Darts: BDO World Trophy | Dave | 2016 |
| Lizard Lick Touring | Dave | 2017 |
| Louis Theroux's Weird Weekends | BBC Two | 1998–2000 |
| Lovejoy | BBC One | 1986–1994 |
| Mad Men | AMC (United States) | 2008–2015 |
| Man Stroke Woman | BBC Three | 2005–2007 |
| Man v. Food | Travel Channel (United States) | 2008–2011 |
| Meat Men | Food Network (Canada) | 2012 |
| Mechannibals | BBC Two | 2005 |
| Men Behaving Badly | ITV; BBC One | 1992–1998 |
| The Mighty Boosh | BBC Three | 2004–2007 |
| Milton Jones – Lion Whisperer Tour – Part One: Earth | Dave | 2011 |
| Mitch and Matt's Big Fish | Good Food | 2008 |
| Moby Dick | Encore (United States) | 2011 |
| Money Pit | Dave | 2015 |
| Mongrels | BBC Three | 2010–2011 |
| Monkey Dust | BBC Three | 2003–2005 |
| Mr. Sunshine | ABC (United States) | 2011 |
| The Mrs Merton Show | BBC Two; BBC One | 1995–1998 |
| My Family | BBC One | 2000–2011 |
| Navelgazing Presents... | Dave | 2011 |
| Neighbours | Seven Network (Australia); Network Ten (Australia); 10 Peach (Australia); Amazon Studios | 1985–2025 |
| Never Mind the Buzzcocks | BBC Two; Sky Max | 1996–2025 |
| Nighty Night | BBC Three | 2004–2005 |
| The Office | BBC Two; BBC One | 2001–2003 |
| Oh No It's Selwyn Froggitt | ITV | 1974–1978 |
| On Thin Ice | BBC Two | 2009 |
| Open All Hours | BBC Two; BBC One | 1976–1985 |
| Operation Good Guys | BBC Two | 1997–2000 |
| Oz and James's Big Wine Adventure | BBC Two | 2006–2007 |
| Parkinson | BBC One; ITV | 1971–2007 |
| Peep Show | Channel 4 | 2003–2015 |
| Phil's Ill | Dave | 2010 |
| Problems | ABC (United States) | 2012 |
| Psychoville | BBC Two | 2009–2011 |
| The Pub Landlord v Nigel Farage: The Battle For South Thanet | Dave | 2015 |
| Pulling | BBC Three | 2007–2009 |
| Quantum Leap | NBC (United States) | 1989–1993 |
| A Question of Sport | BBC One | 1970–2023 |
| Race Car Driver | Syndication (United States) | 2005–2007 |
| Radical Highs | BBC Two | 1998–2000 |
| Ray Mears' Bushcraft | BBC Two | 2004–2005 |
| Ray Mears' Extreme Survival | BBC Two | 1999–2002 |
| Ray Mears Goes Walkabout | BBC Two | 2008 |
| Ray Mears' Northern Wilderness | BBC Two | 2009 |
| Ray Mears' Wild Food | BBC Two | 2007 |
| Ray Mears' World of Survival | BBC Two | 1997–1998 |
| Red Bull Cliff Diving World Series | Dave | 2012–present |
| Red Bull Rampage | Dave | 2008–present |
| Red Bull X-Fighters | Dave | 2008–present |
| Rex the Runt | BBC Two | 1998-2001 |
| Rich Hall's Fishing Show | BBC Four | 2003 |
| Right to the Edge: Sydney to Tokyo by Any Means | BBC Two | 2009 |
| Road Cops | Channel 5 | 2010 |
| Road to Rio | Dave | 2014 |
| Rob Brydon's Annually Retentive | BBC Three | 2006–2007 |
| Rob Brydon's Identity Crisis | BBC Four | 2008 |
| The Rob Brydon Show | BBC Two | 2010–2012 |
| Robot Wars | BBC Two; BBC Choice; Channel 5 | 1998–2018 |
| Rock Profile | Play UK; BBC Two; Funny or Die UK | 1999–2009 |
| Ross Noble: Off Road | Dave | 2017 |
| Rowland Rivron Bites The Bullet | UK Gold | 1996 |
| Ruddy Hell! It's Harry & Paul; Harry & Paul | BBC One; BBC Two | 2007–2012 |
| Russell Howard – Dingledodies | Dave | 2009 |
| Russell Howard Live: Right Here Right Now | Dave | 2011 |
| Russell Kane: Smokescreens & Castles Live | Dave | 2011 |
| School's Out | BBC One | 2006–2007 |
| Scrapheap Challenge | Channel 4 | 1998–2010 |
| Seaside Rescue | BBC One | 2004–2009 |
| Shark Tank | ABC (United States) | 2009–present |
| Shameless | Channel 4 | 2004–2013 |
| Sharpe | ITV | 1993–2008 |
| Shooting Stars | BBC Two; BBC Choice | 1993–2011 |
| Should I Worry About...? | BBC One | 2004–2005 |
| Sin City Motors | Dave | 2014–2017 |
| Smack the Pony | Channel 4 | 1999–2003 |
| The Smell of Reeves and Mortimer | BBC Two | 1993–1995 |
| The Smoking Room | BBC Three | 2004–2005 |
| Spaced | Channel 4 | 1999–2001 |
| Special Forces: Ultimate Hell Week | BBC Two | 2015–2017 |
| Speed | BBC One | 2001 |
| Speeders | truTV (United States) | 2007–2009 |
| Spooks | BBC One; BBC Three | 2002–2011 |
| Sports Anorak of the Year | UK Gold | 1997–1998 |
| Star Stories | Channel 4 | 2006–2008 |
| Stars in Fast Cars | BBC Three | 2005–2006 |
| State of Play | BBC One | 2003 |
| Stephen Fry in America | BBC One | 2008 |
| Steve Backshall's Extreme Mountain Challenge | BBC Two | 2016 |
| Steve Coogan: The Inside Story | BBC Two | 2009 |
| Stewart Lee's Comedy Vehicle | BBC Two | 2009–2016 |
| Street-Cred Sudoku | UKTV G2 | 2005–2007 |
| Strongman Champions League | Dave | 2015–2016 |
| Suits | USA Network (United States) | 2011–2019 |
| Tellystack | UK Gold | 1996–1997 |
| That Mitchell and Webb Look | BBC Two | 2006–2010 |
| The Thick of It | BBC Four; BBC Two | 2005–2012 |
| They Think It's All Over | BBC One | 1995–2006 |
| This Life | BBC Two | 1996–1997 |
| This Time with Alan Partridge | BBC One | 2019–2021 |
| Three Men in a Boat | BBC Two | 2006–2011 |
| Tim Vine: The Joke-Amotive Live | Dave | 2015 |
| Timber Kings | HGTV (United States) | 2014–present |
| The Tony Ferrino Phenomenon | BBC Two | 1997 |
| Introducing Tony Ferrino - Who? And Why? - A Quest | BBC Two | 1997 |
| Total Wipeout USA | ABC (United States) | 2008–2014 |
| Totally Viral | UKTV G2 | 2006–2007 |
| TOTP2 | BBC Two; BBC Four | 1994–2017 |
| Toyboize | Dave | 2009 |
| Tribe | BBC Two | 2005–2007 |
| Turn Back Time | BBC One | 2006 |
| Two Posh Old Men | UKTV G2 | 2005–2006 |
| Uncle | BBC Three; BBC One | 2014–2017 |
| Undercover | Dave | 2015 |
| Whose Line Is It Anyway? | Channel 4 | 1988–1999 |
| Wild Britain with Ray Mears | ITV; STV; UTV; Eden | 2010–2013 |
| World Rally Championship | Dave | 2008–2010 |
| World's Most Stupid Criminals | Channel 5 | 2003 |
| Yianni: Supercar Customiser | Dave | 2018 |
| You Only Live Once | BBC One | 2000–2001 |
| The Young Ones | BBC Two | 1982–1984 |
| Zimbani (pilot) | Dave | 2010 |

== Dave Weekly podcast ==
In August 2011, Dave launched a regular comedy podcast called The Dave Weekly hosted on joindave.co.uk and accessible via iTunes. Presented by Ben Shires, the podcast comprises interviews with comedians such as Russell Kane, Jo Brand, Adam Buxton, Paul Foot and Alex Horne along with occasional features.

== Dave’s Funniest Joke Of The Fringe ==
Since 2008 the channel has given the Funniest Joke of the Fringe award. The award is voted on by the public from a shortlist and aims to highlight the best single joke told at the Edinburgh Fringe Festival. 'Accommodation' has won the award 10 times.
