= Survival with Ray Mears =

- Created by: Ray Mears
- Presented by: Ray Mears
- Country of origin: United Kingdom
- No. of series: 1
- No. of episodes: 3

Production
- Running time: 60 minutes

Original release
- Network: ITV
- Release: April 18 – May 2, 2010

Related
- Ray Mears' Northern Wilderness; Wild Britain with Ray Mears

Survival with Ray Mears is a three-part television series that was hosted by Ray Mears, following him as he tracks predators in their natural habitats. The series was broadcast by ITV from April 18 to May 2, 2010, and was billed as the return of the Survival brand. It was later followed by Wild Britain with Ray Mears.

Survival consists of three, hour-long programs, focusing on Mears's tracking of the world's top predators. He follows the leopard in Namibia, the bear in British Columbia, and the wolf in Central Idaho. An underpinning theme is the threats faced by each species. In Idaho, the crew arrives only days before the wolf's status as a protected species is lifted, with local farmers indicating their intention to begin hunting them. In British Columbia, the impact of global warming on the salmon population is felt by the bear whilst in Namibia, the uneasy co-existence between leopards and local farmers is highlighted.

== Synopsis ==
=== Episode 1: "Leopards" ===
In the first episode, Ray Mears arrives at the 270 square-mile Erindi Game Reserve in Namibia, a territory he describes as "one of nature's richest environments". The reserve is surrounded by farmland, and the leopards that stray onto them risk being shot by farmers anxious to protect their livestock. He aims to track his favorite predator: the leopard, an elusive big cat that Mears believes is "hardly understood".

He is joined by his wildlife cameramen: Isaac Babcock, Shane Moore, and Natasha De Woronin, who runs the Global Leopard Project. De Woronin needs Mears's tracking skills to help find male leopards, which have so far eluded her. They intend to fit the leopards with radio collars to help build a map of their movements across the reserve.

=== Episode 2: "Bears" ===
In the second episode, Mears travels to the wilderness of British Columbia's Pacific Coast region. He aims to track grizzly bears, black bears, and especially the rare Kermode, or Spirit bear, notable by its pure white fur. It is thought that there are only 400 Kermode alive today.

Mears touches down at the fishing outpost of Klemtu and hires a boat to travel to the remote Mussel Inlet. He finds tracks of grizzly bears taking part in the annual salmon run, which is in full swing. Prints eventually lead him to a grizzly mother and a couple of 2-year-old bear cubs. The crew encounters a massive grizzly male, at which point they carefully retreat.

Leading the team on a final search, Mears finds white hairs on a bear trail near a babbling stream, evidence of the rare Spirit bear.

=== Episode 3: "Wolves" ===
In the third and final episode, Mears and his wildlife crew turn their attention to tracking wolves in the Sawtooth Mountains of Idaho. Wolves are secretive animals, which makes searching for them difficult. He has ten days to track them before they are taken off the state's endangered species list, at which point they can be hunted.

From the town of Stanley, Mears hikes into the small valleys that drain into the Salmon River. He discovers the tracks of some elk, the principal prey for wolves, and soon finds the tracks of a wolf nearby.

The following day the team gets a sighting of a small group of wolves and eventually comes across an entire pack of around a dozen, following the lead of a silver-backed alpha male. A young female dies during the night, reducing Mears to tears.

Worried that the rest of the pack might have suffered the same fate, Mears leads the team on an urgent search. Ultimately, they make another sighting of the wolves preying on rodents. It is a relief for Mears and the whole team, providing an emotional finale to the series.

== See also ==
- Extreme Survival
- Ray Mears' Bushcraft
- Wild Food
- Ray Mears' Northern Wilderness
- Wild Britain with Ray Mears
