= Wild Britain with Ray Mears =

- Created by: Ray Mears
- Presented by: Ray Mears
- Country of origin: United Kingdom
- Original language: English
- No. of series: 3
- No. of episodes: 26

Production
- Running time: 30 minutes
- Production company: ITV Studios / UKTV

Original release
- Network: ITV; Eden
- Release: 11 October 2010 – 8 March 2013

Related
- Survival with Ray Mears

Wild Britain with Ray Mears is a television series hosted by Ray Mears. He explores some of Britain's more inaccessible countryside to discover wildlife.

== Episodes ==
=== Series 1 ===
Episode	Location	Original Air Date	Viewers (millions)	Weekly Rank
1	Deciduous Forest	11 October 2010	3.51	28
2	Shingle Shore	18 October 2010	3.34	28
3	Breckland	1 November 2010	Under 3.35	Outside Top 30
4	Heather Moorlands And Highlands	8 November 2010	3.67	27
5	Wetlands	15 November 2010	3.52	30
6	Hay Meadow	22 November 2010	Under 3.58	Outside Top 30

=== Series 2 ===
Episode	Location	Original Air Date	Viewers (millions)	Weekly Rank
1	Caledonian Pine Forest	14 October 2011	2.94	27
2	Skomer	21 October 2011	Under 3.02	Outside Top 30
3	Chalk	28 October 2011	Under 3.08	Outside Top 30
4	Lowland River	4 November 2011	3.13	25
5	Sea Loch	11 November 2011	Under 3.22	Outside Top 30
6	Ancient Forest	18 November 2011	Under 3.16	Outside Top 30
7	Flow Country	25 November 2011	Under 2.91	Outside Top 30
8	Broadland	2 December 2011	Under 3	Outside Top 30
9	Mountain & Moorland	9 December 2011	Under 2.96	Outside Top 30
10	Compilation episode — Best of Series 2	16 December 2011	2.84	28

=== Series 3 ===
Episode	Location	Original Air Date	Viewers (millions)	ITV Weekly Rank
1	Isle of Mull	4 January 2013	Under 3.09	Outside Top 30
2	Isle of Wight	11 January 2013	Under 3.42	Outside Top 30
3	Yorkshire Dales	18 January 2013	Under 3.42	Outside Top 30
4	Salisbury Plain	25 January 2013	Under 3.42	Outside Top 30
5	River Wye	1 February 2013	Under 3.25	Outside Top 30
6	The Celtic Rainforest	8 February 2013	Under 3.24	Outside Top 30
7	Isle of Wight	15 February 2013	Under 3.09	Outside Top 30
8	Isle of Scilly	22 February 2013	Under 3.31	Outside Top 30
9	The Weald	1 March 2013	Under 2.96	Outside Top 30
10	Compilation episode — Best of Series 3	8 March 2013	Under 3.01	Outside Top 30

== See also ==
- Extreme Survival
- Ray Mears' Bushcraft
- Wild Food
- Ray Mears' Northern Wilderness
- Survival with Ray Mears
