= Ray Mears' World of Survival (TV series) =

- Also known as: World of Survival
- Created by: Ray Mears
- Presented by: Ray Mears
- Country of origin: United Kingdom
- No. of series: 2
- No. of episodes: 12

Production
- Running time: 50 minutes
- Production company: BBC

Original release
- Network: BBC Two
- Release: 1997 – 1998

Related
- Extreme Survival, Ray Mears' Bushcraft, Ray Mears Goes Walkabout

Ray Mears' World of Survival (not to be confused with the World of Survival nature program that aired in the United States from 1971 to 1979) is a survival television series hosted by Ray Mears. The series airs on the BBC in United Kingdom, it is also shown on Discovery Channel in the United States, Canada, India, Italy, Brazil, New Zealand, Australia, Norway, Sweden, The Netherlands and Russia. The show was first broadcast in 1997 with "The Arctic", and ended in 1998. It would be followed by Extreme Survival.

In World of Survival, Ray demonstrates his wilderness skills and is taught new skills in every episode.

The show also has a cult status. Due to its popularity, more Ray Mears shows have since been produced.

== Episodes ==
=== Season 1 ===
1. "The Arctic": Ray Mears looks at how the Inuit of Baffin Island survive in temperatures as low as -40C.
2. "Arnhem Land": Ray meets the Aborigines who live in northern Australia in amazingly high temperatures and humidity.
3. "Siberia": Ray meets the Evenk people who live in the Taiga forest of Siberia.
4. "Savaii": Ray investigates what life is like on the island of Savaii in Western Samoa.
5. "Namibia": Ray learns some more survival skills from the Jo'hansi bushmen of Namibia.
6. "The Spice Islands, Indonesia": Ray travels to the island of Seram and meets the Nuaulu, a rainforest people who are historically headhunters.

=== Season 2 ===
1. "Heart of the Rift": The Hadza, one of the few surviving tribes of hunter-gatherers, live on the eastern shore of Lake Eyasi in Tanzania.
2. "The Land of Genghis Khan": Ray explores survival skills practised by peoples of the Mongolian Steppes, one of the remotest places on Earth.
3. "Headwaters of the Orinoco": Ray journeys into the Amazon rainforest to meet the ancient Sanema tribe, whose way of life has barely changed for 10,000 years.
4. "The Coromandel Coast": Ray encounters the dangers of India's Coromandel Coast, where he learns to fish with the people of the Vadabalija tribe, whose specialised sailing skills allow them to live off one of the most lethal stretches of water in the world.
5. "The Barren Lands": Ray learns the finer points of fishing in Labrador, Canada, and visits the native Innu people at a winter hunting camp where porcupine figures high on the menu and the brains of unfortunate caribou are used to tan their hides for buckskin.
6. "The Red Centre": Ray ventures into the Central Australian Desert to meet a tribal elder of the indigenous Aboriginal people and learn about their unusual navigation methods. He also picks up some nutritional tips, dining on a mixed diet of emu, grubs and ants.

== See also ==
- Ray Mears' World of Survival, a book released accompanying the series
- Wild Food
