= Paul Kirtley =

- Born: England
- Occupation: Author
- Years active: 2003–present
- Known for: Bushcraft

Paul Kirtley (born 17 January 1973) is a British woodsman, author and professional wilderness bushcraft instructor and noted writer on the subjects of bushcraft, wilderness travel and survival. He is the founder of Frontier Bushcraft and has received several awards for his online content and blog including being voted best outdoor blog by retailer Go Outdoors in 2017, and was ranked #1 Bushcraft blog globally by FeedSpot Media in 2018.

== Career history ==
Kirtley began his career with an interest in mountain biking and walking in the Lake District in the UK, before going on to do long solo hikes in Scotland while he attended Edinburgh University in the 1990s. After several years of hiking, he developed an interest in bushcraft and wanting to develop his skills more formally, contacted former British SAS member Lofty Wiseman, attempting to join the Lofty Wiseman Survival School which had become defunct. This led him to seek out other sources of formal training which led him to Ray Mears company, Woodlore, where he began taking courses.

Kirtley was then made an instructor in 2003 in Woodlore, working alongside Swedish instructor Juha Rankinen, later supporting international courses in Sweden with Lars Fält. He became Course Director of Woodlore in 2005, in charge of both domestic and international woodcraft programs, as well as instructing domestically and internationally.

Kirtley left Woodlore in 2010 to pursue other opportunities within outdoor education, including starting his own wilderness skills training company, Frontier Bushcraft, starting his own blog and collaborating with other YouTube survival channels. In 2021 he published his first book, Wilderness Axe Skills and Campcraft.

== Wilderness bushcraft blog ==
Kirtley now authors a regarded Wilderness Bushcraft Blog posting articles on bushcraft skills, tracking, wild foods and wilderness first aid.

Kirtley's work has been gaining interest within the bushcraft community, where his articles are regarded as well written and accurate.

== Bushcraft school ==
In 2010 Kirtley set up his own bushcraft school called Frontier Bushcraft. The school has rapidly established itself as one of the leading bushcraft schools in the UK and in its first year was short-listed as finalist in the Bushcraft & Survival Skills Magazine best in bushcraft awards.

== Books ==
- Wilderness Axe Skills and Campcraft (2021)
