= Mors Kochanski =

Canadian writer (1940–2019)

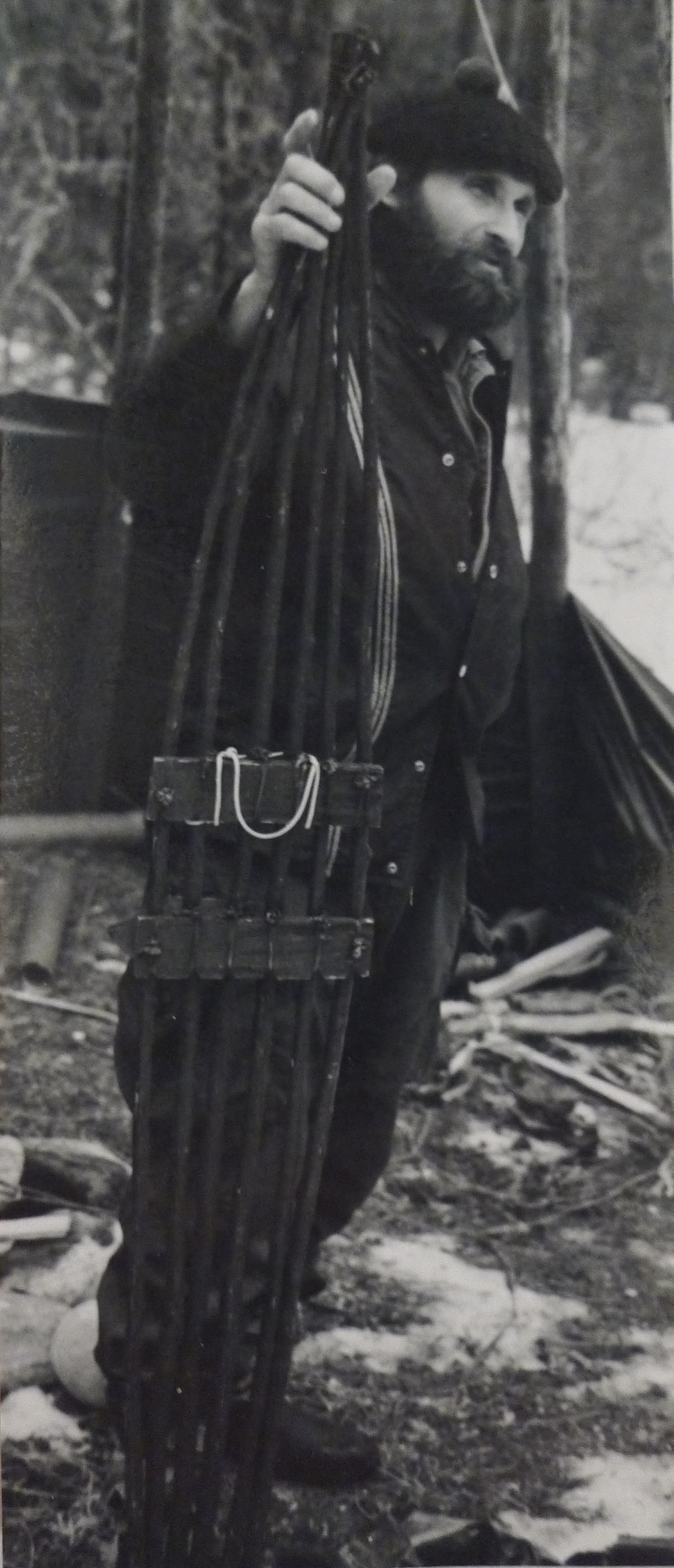
- Born: November 10, 1940; Prince Albert, Saskatchewan Canada
- Died: December 5, 2019 (aged 79); Alberta, Canada
- Occupations: Survival and wilderness skills instructor and author
- Known for: Bushcraft and survival techniques

Mors Kochanski (November 10, 1940 – December 5, 2019) was a Canadian bushcraft and wilderness survival instructor, naturalist, and author. He acquired an international following and instructed for both military and civilians in Canada, the US, the UK and Sweden. He died from peritoneal mesothelioma in 2019.

== Early life ==
The Kochanski family immigrated to Canada from Poland in 1938. Mors, the fifth of six children, was born in 1940. His mother named him "Morris" but, because of a misunderstanding due to her Polish accent, the midwife wrote "Mors" on the birth certificate.

Kochanski was brought up on a farm in Saskatchewan, where he worked and assisted his father, who had been a windmill carpenter in Poland and who fought for the Polish military during World War I. In his early school years, he travelled seven miles to and from school on a bush road. In 1954 his family moved to Prince Albert, where he frequented the local library and took particular interest in two books: an old Boy Scout manual, and The Ashley Book of Knots. Kochanski lasted only one year as a Scout, due to disappointment in what he perceived as a lack of seriousness on the part of his fellow scouts and the Scout Master's aversion to camp craft skills.

Kochanski was a Sea Cadet for three years. He chose the Navy as a career and received a scholarship to the Canadian Services College, Royal Roads. While enrolled, he travelled by ship through the Panama Canal in the summer of 1959. He was hospitalized for five weeks during his studies due to mumps. This contributed to an honourable discharge. From 1960 to 1964, he studied arts and sciences at the University of Saskatchewan, taking classes in anthropology, psychology, geology and writing.

== Instructor career ==
After his departure from university, Mors resolved to become a specialist in outdoor subjects, focused on wilderness living skills and the lifestyles of native peoples. However, he took many jobs before finding his opportunity to become an instructor, including concrete technician, geologist assistant, engineering technician, surveyor, social worker, and draughtsman, a job at which he updated the street plans of Prince Albert after the installation of gas mains. It was also around this time that he received a pilot's license.

In 1968, Blue Lake Centre (near Hinton, Alberta) began operating outdoor education programs. Mors, now 28 years of age, offered his services. At the same time, he met his friend and mentor, Tom Roycraft. At the time, Tom was the senior civilian survival instructor at a Department of National Defence survival school.

During the 1970s, Mors became an associate professor at the University of Alberta Faculty of Physical Education, editor of Alberta Wilderness Arts and Recreation magazine, and a freelancer for various agencies. In 1986, he was approached to write a book on survival and wilderness skills for the Canadian boreal forests which was originally titled Northern Bushcraft. The book became a Canadian bestseller. The original title 'Northern Bushcraft' was in reference to an earlier publication, "Bushcraft" by Richard Harry Graves, which covered survival and wilderness living skills in the Australian environment. Eventually, the publishers later shortened the title to Bushcraft.

== List of publications ==
- Wilderness Arts and Recreation Magazine (editor and author, with Tom Roycraft and Don Bright of Edson, Alberta) - beginning in 1976.
- Bushcraft – originally released as Northern Bushcraft in 1988. A guide to outdoor skills and wilderness survival. (Lone Pine Publishing)(Northern Bushcraft - 1988 ISBN 1-871890-30-6) (Bushcraft - 1998 ISBN 1-55105-122-2)
- Bush Arts – a guide to hand crafting with materials from the boreal forest. Lone Pine Publishing, 1989 ISBN 0-919433-49-9
- Wilderness Skills Series and A Plant Walk with Mors Kochanski - (DVD series produced by Karamat Wilderness Ways)
- Booklet series (17+ tiles, inc. Basic Wilderness Skills in Deep Snow, Survival Kit Ideas, etc.) – published by Karamat Wilderness Ways
- Basic Safe Travel and Boreal Survival Handbook: Gems from Wilderness Arts and Recreation Magazine in 2013. A guide to outdoor skills and wilderness survival. (Publisher: Karamat Wilderness Ways, ISBN 978-1894453684)
- Grand Syllabus, Instructor Trainee Program: Survival, Wilderness Living Skills, Bushcraft in 2015. (Publisher: Karamat Wilderness Ways, ISBN 978-1894453677)
