= Ju Ju Wilson =

Australian aboriginal artist

- Born: 1960 (age 65–66); Mantinea Flats, Western Australia
- Other names: Burriwee
- Occupations: Aboriginal artist, craftsperson
- Known for: Bushcraft and survival techniques

Ju Ju Wilson (born in 1960 at Mantinea Flats, northern part of Western Australia) is an Aboriginal artist and part of the contemporary Indigenous Australian art movement.

== Career ==
Wilson is a painter, printmaker, tour guide, cultural advisor, and an expert in bush tucker wild edible foods and medicines, author of booklets (on these subjects), didgeridoo maker and player. She is an authority on Aboriginal sacred sites and rock art.

She has advocated for the preservation of Indigenous culture and heritage, and the necessity to preserve Australia's rock art. Burriwee and other Indigenous Australian's believe "the land and the art have spiritual values that represent environmental phenomena, beyond the comprehension of most." She has stated that the state government's aerial fire-bombing and ground burnings threaten "sacred traditions, rooted in Dreamtime, which resonate with current environmental concerns." Burriwee is concerned that many of the 8,742 specimens that are located in Western Australia, " Kununurra, along the Mitchell Plateau, across the Bungle Bungles to Faraway Bay'" have been damaged. As an elder she remembers visiting these sacred sites during her lifetime, however most of these examples can no longer been seen

Wilson has written about the medicinal properties of the plant, Dolichandrone heterophyla.

She is frequently invited to make appearances on television shows to talk about her art and abilities, such as her 2008 appearance on Ray Mears Goes Walkabout on BBC Two.

== Personal life ==
Mother of six, Wilson comes from the Miriwoong-Gajirrawoong group of the Kimberley region and was educated at Beagle Bay. Four generations of her family are artists (her maternal grandmother, her mother and her daughter are also Aboriginal artists).

Her Miriwoong name is Burriwee and she can speak five Aboriginal languages fluently.

== Collections ==
Wilson's work is held in the permanent collection of the National Gallery of Australia, Canberra.
