= Kimberly Strubell =

Online identity created by comedian Dicky J. Stock

Kimberly Strubell is an online identity originating from Facebook, created by Boston comedian Dicky J. Stock. Stock had created Kim's lewd and often surreal personality in an effort to parody South Shore Bostonians.

== Influence ==
Kimberly has been used as a means to influence local Boston politics and culture, including the naming of a Massachusetts Transit Police dog, Mr. Spaghetti (which was ultimately declined by the Transit Police); the creation of a Boston mayoral campaign for her fictional ex Coast Guard husband, Leonard (Larry) Nabisco; and shining a spotlight on a local WCBV reporter Kim accused of partaking in Urophagia. Her son, Kent, is also a major focal point in her vivacious posts, often citing his name and age. The account was briefly taken down on December 29, 2016; but has since been resurrected.

On February 19, 2017, Kimberly tweeted that she would be moving to Los Angeles in April with her family. She eventually moved back to Boston by 2018.
