= Ray Mears' Northern Wilderness =

2009 British television series

- Created by: Ray Mears
- Presented by: Ray Mears
- Country of origin: United Kingdom
- No. of series: 1
- No. of episodes: 6

Production
- Running time: 60 minutes
- Production company: BBC

Original release
- Network: BBC Two
- Release: 25 October – 29 November 2009

Related
- World of Survival, Extreme Survival, Ray Mears' Bushcraft

Ray Mears' Northern Wilderness is a television series hosted by Ray Mears, showing Mears in Canada. The series is broadcast by the BBC.

Mears also released a book of the same title.

== Synopsis ==
Ray Mears explores the Canadian wilderness. His journey begins in the Boreal Forest at the heart of Canada, where he examines and demonstrates the survival skills of the aboriginal people of the territory. Episode 1 was filmed in Prince Albert National Park, Episode 2 was filmed along the French River in Ontario and Episode 6 was filmed in British Columbia.

Ep1 - 'The Forgotten Forest' - Covering the Canadian Boreal Forest

Ep2 - 'The Company That Built a Country' - Activities of the Hudson's Bay Company

Ep3 - 'The Unknown Pioneer' - The journeys of Samuel Hearne

Ep4 - 'In Arctic Footsteps' - The achievements of John Rae

Ep5 - 'Koo Koo Sint - The Star Gazer' - The work of David Thompson

Ep6 - 'Journey's End' - Covering the Canadian Pacific Coast

== See also ==
- Extreme Survival
- Ray Mears' Bushcraft
- Wild Food
- Survival with Ray Mears
