= Stefan Gates =

British television presenter

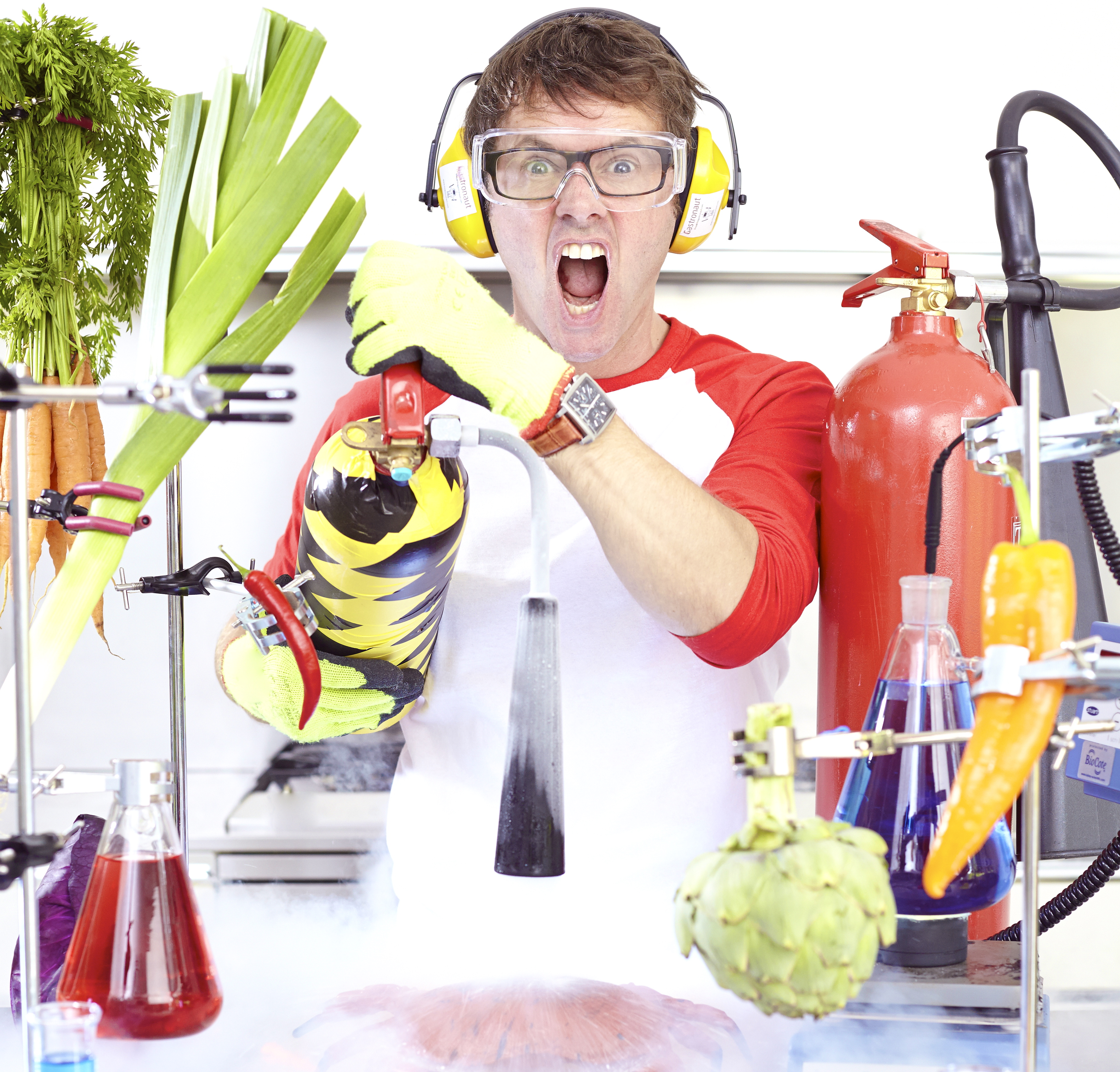
- Occupations: Television presenter; food writer
- Years active: 1990–present

Stefan Gates is a British television presenter, author, broadcaster and live-show performer. He has written books about food, cooking and science. He has presented over 20 TV series mostly for the BBC, including Cooking in the Danger Zone about unusual food from the world's more dangerous and difficult places. He develops half of these TV series himself, including the CBBC children's food adventure series Gastronuts and Incredible Edibles.

Gates presented BBC One's Food Factory. He wrote and presented the BBC Two series E Numbers: An Edible Adventure, Full on Food and the BBC Four series Feasts.

Gates has also written and presented two BBC Four documentaries: Calf's Head and Coffee: The Golden Age of English Food on food history, and Can Eating Insects Save the World? on entomophagy. He appears as a guest on TV and radio programmes including Newsnight, Loose Ends, BBC Breakfast, Sunday Brunch, The Wright Stuff, Iron Chef, Blue Peter, The Alan Titchmarsh Show and This Morning. Gates was a panellist on BBC Radio 4's Kitchen Cabinet, and has made two radio documentaries.

He is the author of 13 books, including recent titles such as Fartology: The Extraordinary Science Behind the Humble Fart (2018), Catology: The Weird and Wonderful Science of Cats (2021), Rude Science (2024), and Science You Can Eat: Putting What We Eat Under the Microscope (2025), a children's science book that explores food through interactive experiments.

== Early life ==
As a child, along with his sister Samantha, he was photographed for knitwear patterns and appeared separately in commercials and TV dramas, including Poldark and Supernatural. They were the child models on the cover of English rock band Led Zeppelin's album Houses of the Holy (1973).

== TV career ==
Gates presents food programmes including three series of Cooking in the Danger Zone, which has been shown in 25 countries, as well as broadcast globally on BBC World News. In each episode of the series he visits a dangerous part of the world such as Afghanistan, Chernobyl, Haiti and Burma where the living is not easy and the food is unusual. This has gained him a reputation for travelling to difficult or extreme places and eating unusual or shocking food. The series won the Slow Food award for best TV series at the 2008 Slow Food on Film Festival in Bologna and was nominated for the 2009 Guild of Food Writers Food and Travel award.

== TV ==
- Full on Food BBC Two 2004
- Cooking in the Danger Zone series 1-3 BBC Two and BBC Four 2006-08
- Food Uncut UKTV Food 2007
- Gastronuts I BBC One and CBBC 2008-09
- Feasts BBC Four 2009
- Gastronuts II BBC One and CBBC 2010
- E Numbers: An Edible Adventure BBC Two 2010
- Ecomaths BBC Learning 2012
- Incredible Edibles I CBBC 2012
- CBBC's Olympic Challenge CBBC 2012
- Food Factory BBC One 2012
- Calf's Head and Coffee: The Golden Age of English Food BBC Four 2012
- Can Eating Insects Save the World? BBC Four Spring 2013
- Incredible Edibles II CBBC Spring 2013
- Harvest BBC2 and BBC Learning 2013
- Ecomaths BBC Learning 2013
- Food and Drink BBC2 2014
- Disaster Chefs CBBC 2014
- Gastrolab BBC Learning 2015
- The Secrets of Our Favourite Dishes BBC Learning 2015
- The Wright Stuff Channel 5 2015 – 2018
- Jeremy Vine Show Channel 5 2018
- Travel with a Goat Impact 2019
- Supermarket Secrets Revealed Channel 5 2019

== Radio ==
- Stefan Gates' Cover Story Radio 4 2010
- What Would Jesus Eat? BBC Radio 4 2011

== Books ==
- Gastronaut (2005), ISBN 978-0-563-52272-0
- In The Danger Zone (2008), ISBN 978-1-84607-264-2
- 101 Dishes to Eat Before You Die (2009), ISBN 978-1-4075-6441-8
- Stefan Gates on E Numbers (2010), ISBN 978-1-84091-561-7
- The Extraordinary Cookbook (2010), ISBN 978-1856269216
- Incredible Edibles (2012), ISBN 978-1406339062
- Insects: An Edible Field Guide (2017), ISBN 9781785035258
- Fartology: The Extraordinary Science Behind the Humble Fart (2018) ISBN 9781849499682
- Science You Can Eat: Putting what we Eat Under the Microscope (2019), ISBN 9780241301838
- Catology: The Weird and Wonderful Science of Cats (2021), ISBN 9781787136328
- Dogology: The Weird and Wonderful Science of Dogs (2021), ISBN 9781787136335
- Rude Science: Everything You've Always Wanted To Know About the Science No One Ever Talks About (2022), ISBN 9781787136403
- Loveology: The Explicit and Extraordinary Truth About Love, Sex and Relationships (2025), ISBN 9781837832194
