= Intonjutsu =

Intonjutsu (隠遁術 lit. Kanji for "disappearing technique") is the ninja art of "disappearing" and has many walking and stealth techniques. It also comprises wilderness survival, fieldcraft, and Shinobi-aruki (silent movement steps and leaps).

== See also ==
- List of survivalism topics
- Survival, Evasion, Resistance and Escape
- Survive, Evade, Resist, Extract
