= Urophagia =

Consumption of urine

Urophagia is the consumption of urine. Urine was consumed in several ancient cultures for various health, healing, and cosmetic purposes. People have been known to drink urine in extreme cases of water scarcity; however numerous sources, including the US Army Field Manual, advise against it. Urine may also be consumed as a sexual activity.

Some male animals taste their female counterpart's urine to test fertility.

== Human health warnings ==
The World Health Organization has found that the pathogens contained in urine rarely pose a health risk. However, it does caution that in areas where Schistosoma haematobium, a parasitic flatworm, is prevalent, it can be transmitted from person to person.

== Humans ==
=== Emergency survival techniques ===
Survival guides such as the US Army Field Manual, the SAS Survival Handbook, and others generally advise against drinking urine for survival. These guides state that drinking urine tends to worsen rather than relieve dehydration due to the salts in it, and that urine should not be consumed, even when no other fluid is available.

Aron Ralston drank urine when trapped for several days with his arm under a boulder. Survivalist television host Bear Grylls drank urine and encouraged others to do so on several episodes on his TV shows.

=== Medicine ===
Historically, doctors would taste patients' urine to test for diabetes mellitus. The sweet taste of the urine in diabetics was due to the presence of glucose in urine, as seen in hyperglycaemia.

=== Folk medicine ===
In various cultures, alternative medicine can advocate the consumption of urine from various animals such as humans, camels, or cattle for medicinal or cosmetic purposes, but no evidence supports their use.

=== Forced ===
People may be forced to drink urine as a form of torture or humiliation, as in the case of a Dalit boy in Jaunpur, India, who in 2023 was accused by local youths of sexually harassing a girl.

== Animals ==
=== Giraffes ===
Male giraffes will nudge a female to make her urinate, then taste the urine to assess whether the female is fertile or not.

=== Dogs ===
Some dogs sniff their urine then taste it.

== See also ==
- Ingestion of semen in humans
