= Ray Mears =

British woodsman and TV presenter (born 1964)

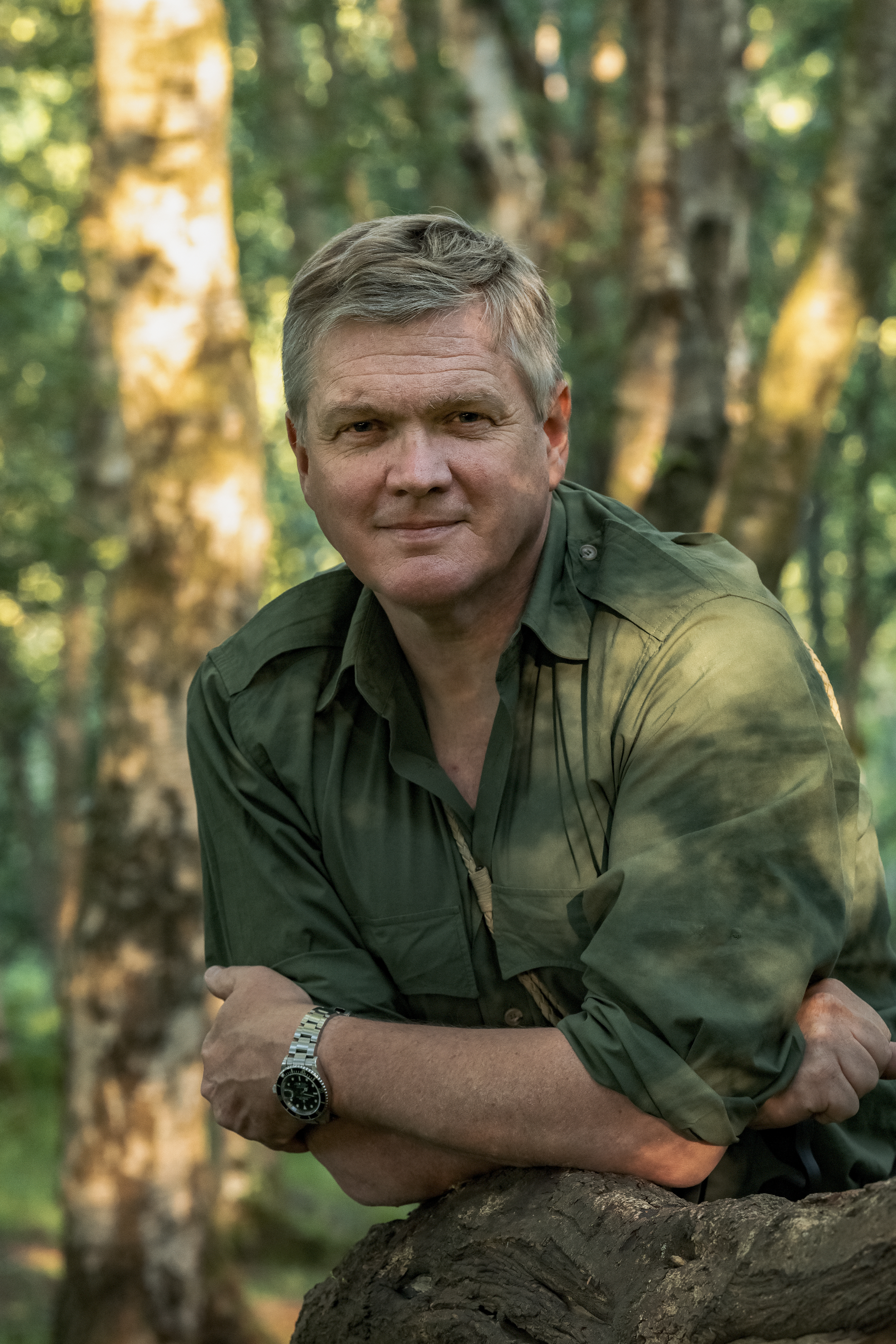
- Mears in 2021
- Born: 7 February 1964 (age 62); Coulsdon and Purley, Surrey, England
- Occupations: Television presenter, author
- Years active: 1994–present
- Employer: ITV
- Known for: Bushcraft
- Spouses: Rachel Mears (m. 2005; died 2006) Ruth Mears (m. 2009)

Raymond Paul Mears (born 7 February 1964) is a British woodsman, instructor, businessman, author and TV presenter. His TV appearances cover bushcraft and survival techniques.

He is best known for the TV series Ray Mears' Bushcraft, Ray Mears' World of Survival, Extreme Survival, Survival with Ray Mears, Wild Britain with Ray Mears and Ray Mears Goes Walkabout.

== Early life ==
Mears grew up on the North Downs, in Southern England. He attended Downside Preparatory School in Purley and then Reigate Grammar School, where he was a member of the Royal Navy section of the Combined Cadet Force.

Mears's ambition was to join the Royal Marines, but he could not meet the eyesight requirements for entry. After taking A-levels, Mears briefly worked in an office in the City of London.

== Career ==
In 1983, Mears founded Woodlore, a company that offers bushcraft-related courses and paraphernalia. It became so successful that it soon led to the trademarking of the name "Ray Mears". Mears first appeared on television in 1994 presenting the BBC series Tracks and then, in 1997, Ray Mears' World of Survival. In 2003, he presented the BBC documentary Ray Mears' Real Heroes of Telemark about the Norwegian heavy water sabotage mission during World War II.

In 2003, Mears won The Ness Award.

While filming a documentary in Wyoming, US in 2005, Mears was involved in a serious accident. The helicopter in which he and his camera crew were travelling hit the ground during a steep low level turn, and broke apart, rolling to a stop. The fuel tank was ruptured in the accident and escaping fuel covered Mears and the crew. No fire occurred, and Mears was able to escape the wreckage uninjured and assist in the rescue and administer first aid to one of the crew who was badly hurt.

In 2009, Mears was approached by ITV to present a planned revival of the nature documentary series Survival. The resulting three-part series was rebranded Survival with Ray Mears and broadcast on ITV1 in 2010. Each episode followed Mears as he used his tracking skills to locate bears, wolves and leopards.

In a Radio Times interview to promote the series, Mears complained of being typecast by the BBC with the result that he was not offered the opportunity to present wildlife programmes. Mears was a guest on BBC Radio 4's Desert Island Discs in January 2014.

In 2009, he was awarded the prestigious Mungo Park Medal.

In July 2010, Mears was asked by Northumbria Police to help them track fugitive killer Raoul Moat, after he fled his temporary tent-based shelter in the village of Rothbury.

Between 2010 and 2013 he presented three series of Wild Britain on ITV. The first series consisted of six 45 minute episodes, while series two and three had ten episodes of programmes lasting half an hour. Each programme would see Mears visit a different habitat in a different part of the country. The programme was a rating success, regularly featuring in the top 30 watched programmes of the week.

2013 also saw Mears write My Outdoor Life, which was a Sunday Times bestseller.

In 2014, he presented Wilderness Walks, where he visited six areas of natural beauty across the United Kingdom. Each episode would see Mears spend a day in a location exploring the local wildlife and offering advice on how to find wild food and make the most of natural resources. In 2015 he presented Wild River, a one-off episode where he explores the wildlife around the River Wye.

2016 saw him present Wild Australia where he explored the wildlife of several locations both on land and in the sea, coming across several iconic Australian species, such as the Red Kangaroo and Platypus. He then presented six episodes of Wild France, travelling around the country and looking at its wildlife. Following the same format as his previous series, each programme focused on a different environment. He returned to Australia in 2017, presenting the seven part-series Australian Wilderness with Ray Mears.

In 2021, he presented Wild China with Ray Mears, a seven part series, where he visited a range of habitats and looked at several iconic species, including snow leopard and giant panda.

== Personal life ==
Mears met his first wife, Rachel, in 1992 when she attended one of his five-day survival courses. The couple lived in Eastbourne, East Sussex with her two adult children and married in 2005, after Rachel was diagnosed with breast cancer. Rachel died in 2006, aged 50, and her ashes are scattered in Ashdown Forest near their home.

Mears married again in 2009 to Ruth. They live in Sussex with her stepson.

In 2019, he was awarded an honorary degree from the University of York's archaeology department for "...his excellent representation of craft, the wilderness and public outreach."

== Series ==
- Wild Tracks (BBC, 1994)
- Tracks (BBC, 1994–1997)
- Ray Mears' World of Survival (BBC, 1997–1998, two series of six episodes each)
- Ray Mears' Country Tracks (BBC, 1998, 2002–2003)
- The Essential Guide to Rocks (BBC Education, 1998)
- Ray Mears' Extreme Survival (BBC, 1999–2002, three series of six episodes each)
- Ray Mears' Adventure Special (BBC, 2001) – Mears takes Ewan McGregor into the Honduran jungle on the trail of the prehistoric people of the Mosquito Coast.
- Ray Mears' Real Heroes of Telemark (BBC, 2003)
- Ray Mears' Bushcraft (BBC, 2004–2005, two series of five episodes each)
- Ray Mears' Wild Food (BBC, 2007, five episodes)
- Ray Mears Goes Walkabout (BBC, June 2008, four episodes) – Mears tours the Australian outback. An accompanying hardcover book was published in the UK by Hodder and Stoughton in March 2008. In the series, Mears meets one of his heroes, Les Hiddins (aka "The Bush Tucker Man"). He also heads to the Kimberley region to meet the reputed aboriginal artist and bush guide Ju Ju Wilson.
- Ray Mears' Northern Wilderness (BBC Two, Autumn 2009, six episodes) – Mears follows in the footsteps of pioneers who opened up Arctic Canada, such as Samuel Hearne, John Rae and David Thompson.
- Survival with Ray Mears (ITV, 2010, three episodes)
- Wild Britain with Ray Mears (ITV, 2010–2013, three series)
- Ray Mears: Close Encounters (ITV, 2013)
- How the Wild West Was Won with Ray Mears (BBC Four, 2014)
- Wilderness Walks with Ray Mears (ITV, 2014)
- Wild River with Ray Mears (ITV, 2015)
- Wild Australia with Ray Mears (ITV, 2016)
- Wild France with Ray Mears (ITV, 2016)
- Australian Wilderness with Ray Mears (ITV, 2017)
- Wild China with Ray Mears (ITV, 2021)

== Books ==
- The Survival Handbook (1990)
- The Outdoor Survival Handbook (1992)
- Ray Mears' World of Survival (1997)
- Bushcraft (2002)
- Essential Bushcraft (2003)
- The Real Heroes of Telemark: The True Story of the Secret Mission to Stop Hitler's Atomic Bomb (2003)
- Ray Mears' Bushcraft Survival (2005)
- Wild Food by Ray Mears & Professor Gordon Hillman (2007)
- Ray Mears Goes Walkabout (2008)
- Vanishing World – A Life of Bushcraft (2008)
- Northern Wilderness (2009)
- My Outdoor Life (2013)
- Out on the Land: Bushcraft Skills from the Northern Forest (2016)
- Wilderness Chef: The Ultimate Guide to Cooking Outdoors (2020)
- We Are Nature: How to reconnect with the wild (2021)
- British Woodland (2023)
- Outdoor Tracking Handbook (2025)
