= Richard Harry Graves =

Irish-born Australian poet and novelist

- Born: 17 July 1897; Waterford, Ireland
- Died: 3 February 1971 (aged 73)
- Occupations: Poet, Novelist
- Writing career
- Notable work: Australian Bushcraft

Richard Harry Graves (17 July 1897 – 3 February 1971) was an Irish-born Australian poet and novelist.

He was born in Waterford, the home city of his father, Christen Gerald Graves. His father emigrated to Australia in 1909 and Richard followed him in 1911. He served in the First World War with the 25th Infantry Battalion of the Australian Imperial Force and was wounded at Gallipoli.

In the Second World War, Graves founded and led the Australian Jungle Rescue Detachment of 60 soldiers, which was attached to the Far East American Airforce. These men conducted over 300 rescues, all of which were completed successfully and without losses. After the war he ran a bushcraft school for over twenty years.

Aside from poetry and adventure novels for children, he wrote ten classic books on camping and bushcraft, now published in a single volume. He was a cousin of the English writer Robert Graves.
