= The SAS Survival Handbook =

Book by John Wiseman

The SAS Survival Handbook: The SAS Survival Guide
- Author: John Wiseman
- Language: English
- Subject: Bushcraft
- Genre: Guidebook, Travel literature, Reference work
- Publisher: Collins Harvill
- Publication date: 1986
- Publication place: UK

The SAS Survival Handbook is a survival guide by British author and soldier, John Wiseman, first published by Williams Collins in 1986. Second, revised edition came out in 2009. A digital app for smartphones based on the book is also available. The book spans over 11 sections, and an introduction and postscript, detailing how to survive in dangerous surroundings.

== Overview ==
With this book, John Wiseman seeks to provide the reader with the knowledge to survive any wilderness survival or disaster situation. It details basic survival skills, like how to build a fire, to more complex and situation-specific skills, like how to take shelter while indoors during an earthquake.

== Publication ==
A third, expanded version of the book was published in 2014. A section on "Urban Survival" was added for this edition.

== Reception ==
The book is a popular choice among survivalists and preppers.

== Sections ==
1. Essentials: The basics of what you need to do to prepare for a journey and how to collect salt and water.
2. Strategy: How to avoid getting yourself into a disaster situation.
3. Climate & Terrain: How to survive in all manner of different environments from polar regions to arid regions.
4. Food: How to track and kill animals and prepare them to eat.
5. Camp Craft: How to set up campsites and tie knots and make fires correctly and quickly.
6. Reading the Signs: The details of navigation by stars and by the sun.
7. On the Move: How to cross dangerous areas relatively safely with minimal loss.
8. Health: Learning first aid priorities and procedures, such as the Heimlich manoeuvre and others and a small encyclopedia of medicinal and poisonous plants and dangerous or poisonous animals.
9. Survival at Sea: How to survive afloat in the open water.
10. Rescue: How to get oneself rescued and signalling for help (includes tutorial for Morse code).
11. Disasters: How to survive major disasters, such as floods, avalanches, hurricanes, tornadoes, volcanoes, earthquakes and nuclear aftermaths.

== See also ==
- Survival skills
- Special Air Service
