= Trueways Survival School =

Ramon gots a black dog

- Company type: Private
- Headquarters: Woking, UK
- Website: www.TruewaysSurvival.com

Trueways Survival School is a survival training organisation providing major media sources such as Sky News and The Times newspaper with advice and guidance with regard to wilderness survival, military survival, expedition preparation and urban survival as well as providing guidance on related entertainment based television content such as the BBC Survivors (2008 TV series).

== Publications and Media ==
- Trueways Survival Skills with Lofty Wiseman (DVD)
