= Belgian Civil Protection =

- Civiele Bescherming; Protection Civile; Zivilschutz

Civil Defence overview
- Jurisdiction: Belgium
- Headquarters: Brussels
- Employees: 1,100
- Minister responsible: Annelies Verlinden, Minister of the Interior
- Parent department: Federal Public Service Interior
- Website: www.civilsecurity.be

The Civil Protection is a Belgian federal service that falls under the Directorate-General Civil Security of the Federal Public Service Interior (the former Ministry of the Interior). It operates as a specialized second-line service. It is not a first response service like the fire departments, but is only called upon when specialized assistance is needed. Its main tasks revolve around CBRN incidents, search and rescue operations and heavy technical assistance. Some Civil Protection units however also partake in the regular emergency response in their area, for example for firefighting or emergency medical assistance. The minister of the Interior can also order agents of the Civil Protection to partake in foreign missions of B-FAST, the Belgian foreign emergency relief team.

The Civil Protection consists of a central direction in Brussels and six operational units spread across the Belgian territory. Each operational unit is responsible for the interventions in their area. Some operational units are specialized in certain areas, mostly dependent on their location (for example underground search and rescue). As of 2016, the Belgian Civil Protection employs about 1,100 people, of which 450 professionals and 650 volunteers, and operates almost 670 vehicles. In 2016, it also undertook about 5,500 interventions.

In April 2017, minister of the Interior Jan Jambon announced the closure of four of the six operational units of the Civil Protection. The goal was to reform the Civil Protection to be a purely second line service, and to transfer any first response tasks to the local fire departments. The plans drew criticism from unions and local municipalities, who feared increased response times during disasters. There was also concern about the location of one of the two remaining units, which would lie in the exclusion zone in case of a nuclear accident in the Doel nuclear power plant. Minister Jambon however replied that the specialized tasks the Civil Protection would still have were less time-critical.

== Ranks ==
Superior officers			Officers		
Colonel; Kolonel	Lieutenant-colonel; Luitenant-Kolonel	Major; Majoor	Capitaine-commandant; Kapitein-Commandant	Capitaine; Kapitein	Lieutenant; Luitenant
NCOs			Enlisted		
Adjudant; Adjudant	Sergent; Sergeant		Caporal; Korporaal		Sapeur; Sappeur
Specialists
Spécialiste de niveau 4 Vrijwilliger-Specialist 4	Spécialiste de niveau 3 Vrijwilliger-Specialist 3		Spécialiste de niveau 2 Vrijwilliger-Specialist 2		Spécialiste de niveau 1 Vrijwilliger-Specialist 1

== See also ==
- B-FAST — the federal service responsible for overseas disaster aid
