= CD3WD =

The Third World Development Online Library (CD3WD)
- Website type: Digital library
- Creator: Alex Weir (1948 - 2014)
- Key people: Oliver Walker (2021 - )
- Website: cd3wdproject.org (Active)
- Commercial: No
- Launched: 2003; 23 years ago
- Current status: Active

CD3WD is a project that focuses on assisting in third world development by making technical documents and other relevant information easily available to all people. Created by Alex Weir in 2003, the concept was to share useful DIY guides and technical information for free using CDs. The name CD3WD comes from "CD for the Third World Development". In later versions of the project the archive was distributed on DVD. The last version that is available online (the 2012 version) was a total of 6 DVDs (core set) and 32 DVDs of extra educational content.

== Content of the project ==
CD3WD gathered a massive free electronic library of largely donor-generated information on agriculture, forestry, fisheries, food processing, engineering, appropriate technology, water and sanitation, education, health, etc. This information came mostly from NGOs and governmental agencies. The information was structured into topics and was the 6-DVD core set. The main language of the project was English but there were also parts in other languages. The core set was available from the project's webpage and by DVDs sent by mail.

The project also had an educational extra part of 32 DVDs with educational content from sources like Khan Academy, Wikipedia for Schools and Project Gutenberg. This part of the project was limited to DVDs sent by mail because most of the content was easy to find online.

== Survivalists' interest ==
CD3WD was focused on gathering and spreading information to assist third world development, but the project got much of its attention from survivalists. The information in the archive handled a widespread area of practical topics relevant to preppers. This, the structure, and the offline nature of the CD3WD archive made it ideal for survivalists. In 2013 author Annalee Newitz wrote about humans surviving a global extinction event, saying, "If we're lucky, the hangers-on will have access to a repository of human knowledge called the CD3WD database."

== The discontinuation of the project ==
After the death of Alex Weir in 2014, the project stopped and the project domain "cd3wd.com" was taken over. It is no longer connected to the project. There is still a mirror page of the 2006 version of the website and a torrent of the 2012 version of the project's DVDs was available online. Archive.org has a torrent and ISOs available.

== The Restart of the CD3WD Project ==
In November 2021, a friend of Alex Weir, Oliver Walker, decided to restart the project with the help of other past friends of Alex. They ended up going with a new URL address due to the old one being taken over. This new website is Version 3.4 of the 2010 CD3WD site. With the help of friends and people who have worked with Alex in the past, the new CD3WD Project has gotten access to most of Alex Weir's work, approximately 250 GB of data and documents to be released in 2022.
