= B-FAST =

Emergency response agency in Belgium

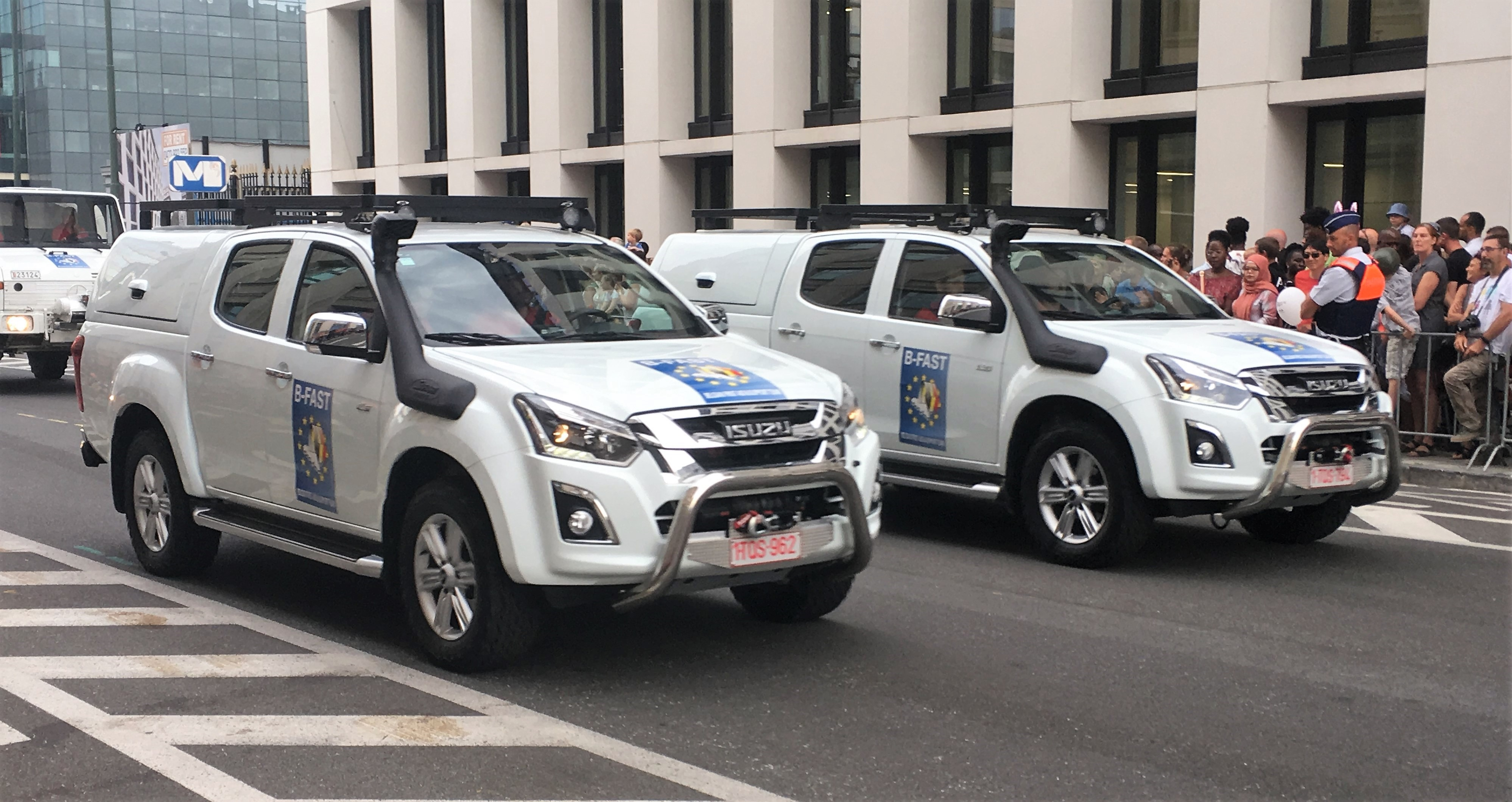
B-FAST vehicles (Belgian First Aid and Support Team) during the National Parade on July 21, 2018

B-FAST (Belgian First Aid and Support Team, sometimes styled B-Fast) is the rapid intervention structure of the Belgian government.

It provides emergency aid during disasters abroad, at the request of the foreign government, providing an armed conflict is absent and when the foreign country is no longer capable itself to organise an adequate aid.

== History ==
It was founded by the Belgian government after the 1999 İzmit earthquake. B-Fast is composed of doctors, nurses, firefighters, members of the Belgian Civil Protection, dog handlers, mountaineering teams, military personnel and logistic helpers.
