= Les Hiddins =

Australian bushcraft expert

Les Hiddins (aka The Bush Tucker Man)
- Born: 13 August 1946 (age 79); Brisbane, Queensland, Australia
- Occupations: Australian Army officer, television presenter, and author
- Known for: Bushcraft and survival techniques

Major Leslie James Hiddins AM, known as "The Bush Tucker Man" is a retired Australian Army soldier and war veteran. He is best known for his love and knowledge of the Australian bush, in particular "bush tucker", as featured in the TV series Bush Tucker Man (1988–1996). Hiddins is recognised by his distinctively modified Army Slouch hat. He has also written several books for children and adults, and in 2019 launched a website that includes a searchable digital database of bush tucker.

== Early life and education ==
Leslie James Hiddins was born on 13 August 1946 in Brisbane, Queensland, Australia.

== Career ==
=== Military service ===
As a soldier with the Australian Army, Hiddins did two deployments in the Vietnam War between 1966 and 1968, the first as a forward scout in the infantry.

Upon return from the war in the late 1960s, feeling the need for a change, he transferred from infantry to army aviation, which led him to flying around northern Australia and Arnhem Land in a helicopter. In 1987, he was awarded a Defence Fellowship to research survival in northern Australia, and was the principal author of the Australian Army's military survival manual in that year. As part of this research, Hiddins was introduced to the Kakadu plum (Terminalia ferdinandiana) by the Aboriginal people, who had used the plant for thousands of years. He claims that the analysis finding it to have the highest concentration of Vitamin C of any known natural substance in the world was made on fruit he provided.

Hiddins retired from the Australian Regular Army (ARA) in 1989 with the rank of Major, but continued to serve with the Army Reserve (ARES) until 2001, working with Indigenous Australian communities in northern Australia. This research turned into the TV series The Bush Tucker Man in 1993.

=== Kalpowar Station/Pandanus Park ===
In 2001, Hiddins led an effort to establish a wilderness retreat, exclusively for war veterans, on a 9 km^{2} parcel of government land along the banks of the Normanby River at "Kalpowar Station", adjoining Rinyirru National Park in Cape York Peninsula. The remote and relatively inaccessible area, devoid of amenities of any kind, was named "Pandanus Park". After years of conflict with government over their illegal occupation, the group secured a 15-year lease when the entire Kalpowar Station was returned to Aboriginal title in 2005.

== Recognition, awards and honours ==
In 1987, Hiddins was awarded a Defence Fellowship to research survival in northern Australia.

In September 1985, he was awarded a National Medal.

In the Queen's Birthday Honours in June 1987, he was made a Member of the Order of Australia, for service to the Australian army in the field of combat survival.

On 28 March 2008, Hiddins was awarded an Honorary Doctor of Science by James Cook University's Faculty of Science, Engineering and Information Technology:

in recognition for his outstanding and distinguished contribution to Australia and the northern Queensland community through his work on the ABC TV series Bush Tucker Man, his time in the defence force (including two tours of duty) where he worked with indigenous communities and establishing a bush retreat in Cape York for Vietnam veterans to enjoy."

The National Museum of Australia in Canberra has a Bush Tucker Man display with some of his original bush gear – his original hat, camera and backpack.

== TV programmes ==
=== Bush Tucker Man ===
Hiddins' research led to the TV series The Bush Tucker Man, made for ABC Television in 1993. The series was co-written, co-directed, and co-produced by Stephen Burstow, David Telfer, and Richard Walker.

In the series, Hiddins drives around in a Land Rover Perentie with his trademark hat, finding and describing native Australian bush food or "bush tucker". Hiddins appeared in two ABC TV series of Bush Tucker Man, as well as the series Bush Tucker Man – Stories of Survival.

- Bush Tucker Man, Series One (1988 – 8 episodes, released on DVD in 2004) – ABC

Episode 1: Arnhem Land (Aborigines of Ngukurr, NT)
Episode 2: The Wet in Port Keats (Northwest Northern Territory in the Wet Season)
Episode 3: Desert (Desert Country)
Episode 4: Prince Regent Gorge (Heart of the Kimberley)
Episode 5: Rain Forest (Rainforest at Iron Range)
Episode 6: Coastal (Northern Queensland Coastline)
Episode 7: Doomadgee (Gulf Country)
Episode 8: Aurukun (West Coast of Cape York)

- Bush Tucker Man, Series Two (1990 – 7 episodes, released on DVD 1 October 2009) – ABC

Episode 1: Wet Season
Episode 2: East To West
Episode 3: Kimberley
Episode 4: Top End
Episode 5: Wildman
Episode 6: Desert Story
Episode 7: Coastal Story

- Bush Tucker Man – Stories of Survival (1996 – 8 episodes, released on DVD in 2004) – ABC

Episode 1: The Coffee Royal Affair
Episode 2: The Cannibal Convict
Episode 3: The Great Misadventure (The Burke and Wills expedition)
Episode 4: The Best of Them All (John McDouall Stuart)
Episode 5: The Dutch Settlement
Episode 6: Gold Fever (Lasseter's Reef)
Episode 7: The Passionate Prussian (Ludwig Leichhardt)
Episode 8: Into The Vilest Country (Edmund Kennedy and Jackey Jackey in the Cape York Peninsula)

A DVD containing the complete series was released in 2010, called Bush Tucker Man: The Collection, re-released in 2019.

=== Other TV ===
Hiddins narrated and presented two TV documentaries for ABC, both created by Paul Hawker: Pandora – in the Wake of the Bounty (1993), and The Resurrection of the Batavia (1995).

Ray Mears made a BBC programme about and with him, shown on BBC Two in June 2009 as part of his Ray Mears Goes Walkabout series.

Hiddins featured in an episode of ABC TV's Landline program in 2019.

== Other media ==
Hiddins and wife Sandy set up an Instagram account, in which they post their archival and current photos, which has brought them a new and younger group of fans, as well as primary school teachers in remote Indigenous communities in Arnhem Land.

In 2019, Hiddins launched a user-pays website that includes a searchable digital database of bush tucker. Users can search by location and season, and the website returns a list of flora and fauna likely to be found in that area at that time.

== Publications ==
Hiddins' publications include Bush Tucker Man – Stories of Exploration and Survival (1996), Bush Tucker Man – Tarnished Heroes (1997), Explore Wild Australia with the Bush Tucker Man (1999), Bush Tucker Fieldguide (2002). In 2000, Hiddins published four books specifically for children: The Coral Coast, The Top End, The Tropical Rainforest, and The Living Desert.

- Bush Tucker Man Series
  - Bush Tucker Man – Stories of Exploration and Survival (1996)
  - Bush Tucker Man – Tarnished Heroes (1997)
  - Explore Wild Australia with the Bush Tucker Man (1999)
  - Bush Tucker Field Guide (2002)
- Children's Books
  - The Coral Coast
  - The Top End
  - The Tropical Rainforest
  - The Living Desert

He also released two CD-ROMs, From the Rainforest to Cape York Peninsula and From Arnhem Land to the Kimberley Ranges.

== See also ==
- Malcolm Douglas
- Steve Irwin
