= Lofty Wiseman =

British writer

John "Lofty" Wiseman is a British author, survival consultant and television presenter. He is a former member of the Special Air Service (SAS), the British special forces unit.

== Life and works ==
In 1959, at the age of eighteen, Wiseman became the youngest person ever to pass selection for the SAS, joining from the Parachute Regiment, which he had joined a year earlier. He went on to serve in the SAS for 26 years, rising to the rank of Warrant Officer. Wiseman was also Head of Operational Research 22 SAS, set up a counter hijack team known as SP Team and founded the SAS Counter-Terrorist Team (who are well known for their involvement in the Iranian Embassy siege).

Before his retirement, Wiseman was also involved in selection courses where he helped decide who was able to join the SAS. When he retired in 1985, the commanding officer of the 22nd SAS said that "Lofty is a legend in this regiment".

After leaving the SAS in 1985, his first book was The SAS Survival Handbook, published in 1986. Wiseman has since become a survival author and consultant, as well as appearing on television. When he provided survival training to the cast of the 1990 film Memphis Belle, his ability to make food out of unlikely materials inspired cast member Harry Connick Jr. to write the album Lofty's Roach Souffle.

Wiseman is a member of the instructional team at Trueways Survival School and was the instructor for the selection/training phase for the show Castaway 2000.

== Bibliography ==
- Ultimate SAS Survival
- Trueways Survival Skills with Lofty Wiseman
- The SAS Self-Defense Handbook: A Complete Guide to Unarmed Combat Techniques
- The SAS Survival Handbook
- The SAS Urban Survival Handbook
- The SAS Driver's Survival Handbook
- Outdoor Survival (Collins Need to Know?)
- SAS Self-defence Manual
- Secret Visitor (fiction)
- Who Dares Grins

== See also ==
- List of former Special Air Service personnel
- Lofty Large
