= The Survival Handbook =

1990 book by Ray Mears

The Survival Handbook: A Practical Guide to Woodcraft and Woodlore
- Author: Ray Mears
- Language: English
- Genre: Handbook
- Publisher: Oxford Illustrated Press
- Publication date: 1 March 1990
- ISBN: 0-946609-88-8

The Survival Handbook: A Practical Guide to Woodcraft and Woodlore is a book written by author, television presenter and outdoorsman Ray Mears. It was first published on 1 March 1990 by The Oxford Illustrated Press and then re-printed by The Promotional Reprint Co Ltd in 1994. It is a guidebook to outdoor life, survival and camping. The difference between the two versions being that the colour photographs were printed on glossy paper in the First Edition. It contains sections on the basics of outdoor skill, making fire by friction, obtaining food, and working with stone, flint and bone as well as working animal hide.

== See also ==
- Survival kit
- Survivalism
