= The Outdoor Survival Handbook =

- Author: Raymond Mears
- Original title: The Complete Outdoor Handbook
- Illustrator: Paul Bryant
- Cover artist: Heather Kim
- Language: English
- Genre: Survival
- Published: 1992
- Media type: Print (paperback)
- Pages: 240
- ISBN: 0-312-09359-4

The Outdoor Survival Handbook is a 1992 survival book by Ray Mears. First published as The Complete Outdoor Handbook; The book is divided into four sections, one for each season with chapters on clothing, survival skills and tools for each. Includes illustrations by Paul Bryant.
