= Cooking in the Danger Zone =

British television series

- Genre: Documentary
- Presented by: Stefan Gates
- No. of series: 3

Original release
- Network: BBC Two
- Release: March 2008

Cooking in the Danger Zone is a documentary television series produced by the BBC and presented by Stefan Gates.

In each film food writer Gates explores unusual food stories in some of the world's more dangerous places. He uses food to explore and understand people's culture and the challenges they face. He has eaten such obscure foods as rat in India, baby seal in the Arctic and radioactive soup in Chernobyl.

Series three completed filming in October 2007 and it aired on BBC Two in March 2008.

== Episodes ==
=== Series One ===
==== Afghanistan ====
Stefan cooks his way around Afghanistan, finding out how the country's reconstruction is going. He samples the testicles of the legendary fat-tailed sheep, known to the locals as the "Afghan Viagra"; narrowly avoids being blown up by abandoned Soviet Scud missiles; and has dinner with a former Taliban commander.

==== South Korea ====
Stefan's in South Korea to find out whether there's anything wrong with eating dogs. He visits a farm where over 2000 dogs are raised for their meat, picks up a few recipes from "Dr Dogmeat", and hears allegations that dogs are tortured to death.

==== Uganda ====
18 July 2006

Gates visits refugee camps in war-torn Northern Uganda, to find out how people survive on meagre UN food rations. The UN gives them just 60% of their daily needs.

==== Fiji and Tonga ====
Gates visits the South Pacific to find out why they are over-eating. In Tonga he finds the fattest people on earth (91% are overweight). In Fiji, he tries the local inebriant kava kava and slaughters a piglet for lunch.

==== China ====
25 July 2006

Gates finds how the rapid pace of modernisation is changing the way people eat. He spends a day working at the Kung Fu fast food joint, samples the menu of a Beijing restaurant, and attempts to shake off his Communist party minders to talk to one of China's poverty-stricken farmers.

=== Series Two ===
==== Chernobyl ====
Gates visits the site of the world's worst ever nuclear disaster to discover how people have survived in its aftermath. Inside the Exclusion Zone, deemed too dangerous to live in, he finds, amongst the ghost towns, a handful of people who have moved back in illegally and live on dangerously contaminated land.

==== Arctic ====
Gates visits the Arctic Circle to spend time with the Inuit living on some of the harshest terrain in the world. He is taken on a seal hunt and tried the local delicacy: eighteen-month-old rotten walrus.

==== India ====
Gates visits the state of Bihar, India's poorest state to meet the Dalits, or "Untouchables". These are the lowest group in the Indian caste system. He helps a dalit girl make dung cakes for fuel. Gates joins them as they are about to tuck into one of their few sources of protein: roasted rat which they catch themselves. Otherwise they survive on rice and little else. He then meets the private militia of the landowners in Bihar, who have hired the men to protect their properties from the dalit labourers, who they accuse of stealing from them in communist agitations.

Gates then travels west across India by rail towards Mumbai, where he talks to people living in the slums of Mumbai, particularly Biharis who have immigrated in an attempt to make a better living. He talks to a dalit dabawalla, a person who carries lunches from people's homes to their offices at midday. Indians prefer their lunches to be freshly cooked and home-made by their wife or mother, thus creating such an occupation.

==== Venezuela ====
Gates finds a country divided between rich and poor and the country's president, Hugo Chávez, using food handouts as part of his socialist revolution. He helps out in one of the soup kitchens providing food to the poor and he also visits a subsidized food shop where the food is quickly running out much to the anger of those waiting in line. He then travels into the hinterland where he finds the ranch owners furious as Chávez has encouraged the poor to take some of their land and farm it themselves.

==== Burma ====
Gates spends two weeks in the jungle with the Karen people who are being hunted by the Burmese army who are starving them out of their villages. Land mines are placed in the fields making it too dangerous to harvest any crops.

=== Series Three ===
==== Israel and the West Bank ====
Gates finds that in Israel and the West Bank, the conflict is rooted in land and expressed in food.
