= Ray Mears Goes Walkabout =

- Created by: Ray Mears
- Directed by: John Miller, Ben Southwell
- Presented by: Ray Mears
- Country of origin: United Kingdom
- No. of series: 1
- No. of episodes: 4

Production
- Running time: 60 minutes
- Production company: BBC

Original release
- Network: BBC Two
- Release: 2008 – 2008

Related
- Ray Mears' World of Survival, Extreme Survival, Ray Mears' Bushcraft

Ray Mears Goes Walkabout is a 2008 survival television series hosted by Ray Mears, showing Mears in Australia.

== Synopsis ==
Mears journeys through the wilderness of the Australian outback to learn about the people, the wildlife, and the culture. He is joined by Australian survival experts who enrich his journey and deepen Mears' understanding of Australian bushcraft. These journeys encompass many of the themes of Mears's world discovery: the natural world, Indigenous Australian culture, adventure, and survival.

In episode 2 of the series, Mears met one of his heroes: Les Hiddins (aka "The Bush Tucker Man"), and they travel in Queensland together.

== Broadcast ==
The series aired from 2008 on the BBC in United Kingdom, and was also shown on Discovery Channel in Canada, India, Italy, Brazil, New Zealand, Australia, Norway, Sweden, the Netherlands, Russia, and the United States. The broadcast version uses an updated Australian-themed take on the opening theme music to Ray Mears' World of Survival.

A book of the same title was released concurrently with the series.
