= Wild Food =

Documentary television series

- Also known as: Wild Food Documentary; Ray Mears' Wild Food Documentary
- Created by: Ray Mears
- Directed by: Ben Southwell
- Presented by: Ray Mears
- Country of origin: United Kingdom
- No. of series: 1
- No. of episodes: 5

Production
- Producer: Andrew Graham-Brown
- Running time: 50 minutes
- Production company: BBC

Original release
- Network: BBC Two
- Release: 2007 – 2007

Related
- Extreme Survival, Ray Mears' Bushcraft, Ray Mears Goes Walkabout

Wild Food Documentary is a documentary television series hosted by Ray Mears. The series airs on the BBC in United Kingdom, it is also shown on Discovery Channel in the United States, Canada, India, Italy, Brazil, New Zealand, Australia, Norway, Sweden, The Netherlands and Russia. The show was first broadcast with an episode set in Australia and ended with "Woodland". The theme tune is not unlike the one heard in World of Survival.

In Wild Food Documentary, Ray presents an informative guide to cookery, travelling across the world to demonstrate traditional cooking skills and cuisine.

== Episodes ==
1. "Australia": Ray travels to the other side of the planet to hear from Australian Aboriginals about what food means to a hunter-gatherer and the role it plays in their culture as well as their society. Along with many other discoveries, the trip sees Ray sample that most iconic of 'bush tucker': the witchetty grub, a huge maggot that lives in the roots of the witchetty bush.
2. "Coast": Ray finds out just what Britain's coast had to offer our ancestors, as he continues to explore the wild food that tickled the taste buds of Stone Age man. The coastline of Stone Age Britain was rather different from today, as Britain was yet to become an island.
3. "Wetlands": Ray and Professor Gordon Hillman, an expert in the use of plants through the ages, look at the marshes and waterways which our ancestors used for travelling and as an abundant source of food. Along the way, Ray explains how to take the sting out of nettles and how to use water lily seeds as a source of carbohydrate. He then travels to the spectacular Ardeche Gorge in France where he gains special permission to take to his canoe and demonstrate spear fishing.
4. "Summer Harvest": Summer Harvest shows that our ancestors would have had access to a wide variety of plant foods, but meat would have been the staple in their diet. Ray shows viewers how they would have cooked a deer in a huge pit and then demonstrates how they would have preserved the meat by smoking it.
5. "Woodland": For our ancestors, Autumn would have been the last chance to gather food before winter stole much of it away. Nuts are an obvious source of stored energy. Ray travels to the island of Colonsay in Scotland to investigate the remains of thousands of charred hazelnuts in a midden pit which date back to the Stone Age.

== See also ==
- Ray Mears
- Ray Mears' World of Survival
- Extreme Survival
- Ray Mears' Bushcraft
- Ray Mears Goes Walkabout
