= Ray Mears' World of Survival =

Cover of the book

Ray Mears' World of Survival is a 1997 book written by Ray Mears and a TV series by the same name.
