= Bushcraft =

Wilderness survival skills

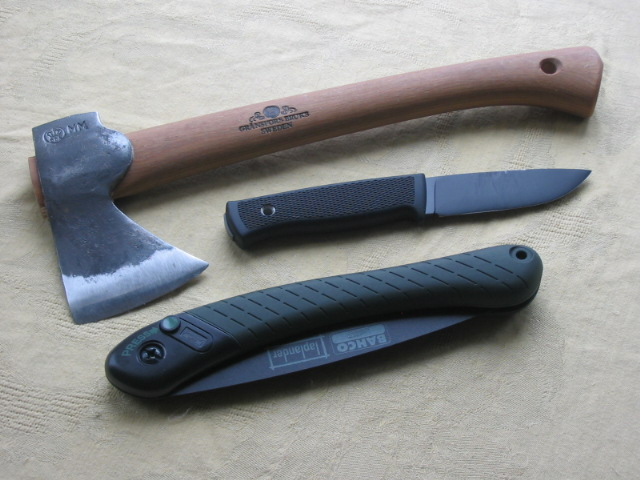
A hatchet, a knife, and sometimes a saw are staple tools for bushcraft.

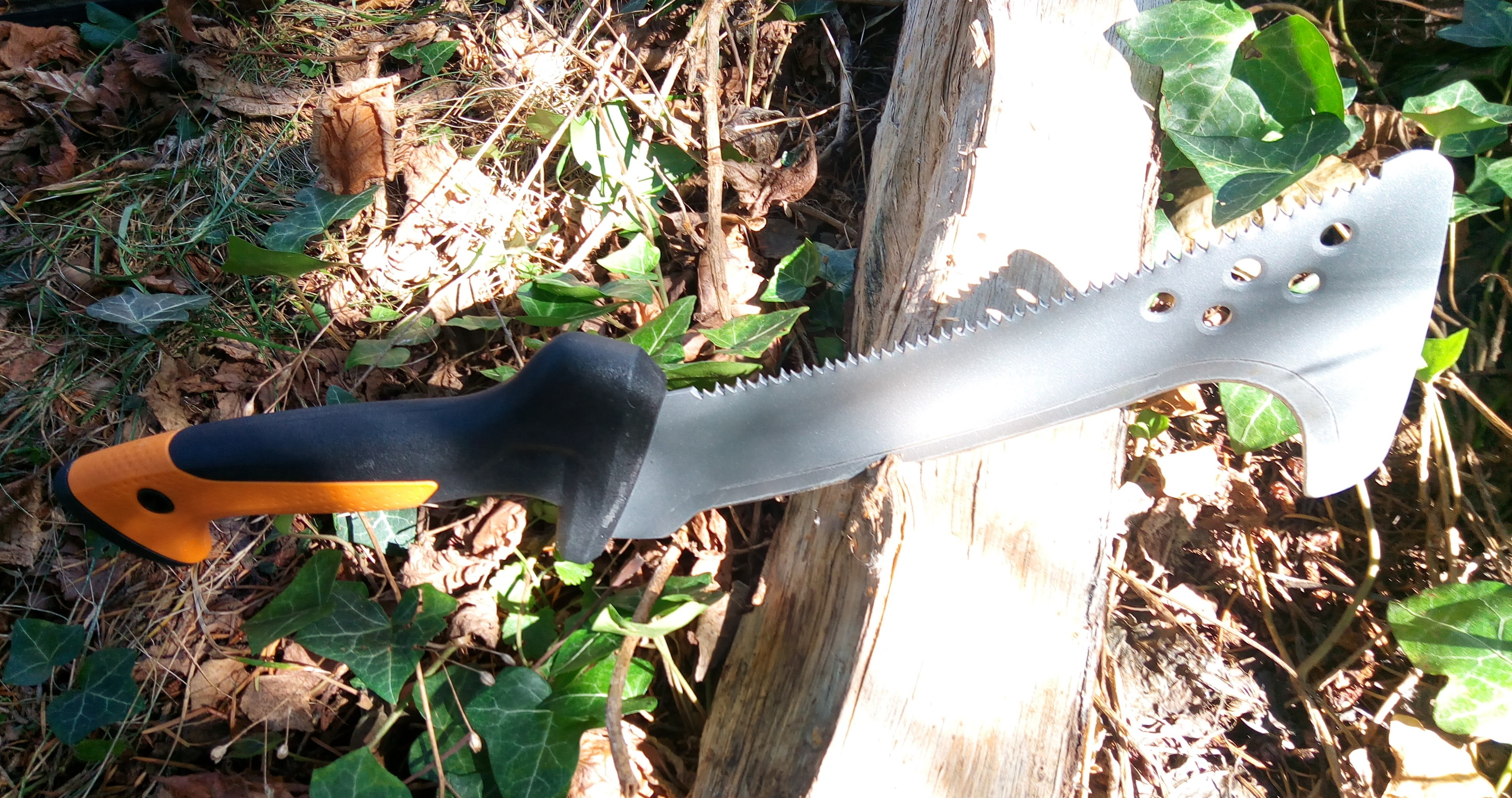
A billhook (a common tool in Europe) with a saw blade, used as a bushcraft tool in France

Bushcraft is the use and practice of skills to survive and thrive in a natural environment. Bushcraft skills include foraging, hunting, fishing, firecraft, and tying knots. Woodcraft is a subset of bushcraft that focuses on survival skills for use in woodland or forest environments. Fieldcraft is a military or tactical form of bushcraft.

== Skills ==
Bushcraft skills provide basic necessities for human life: food (through foraging, tracking, hunting, trapping, fishing), water sourcing and purification, shelter-building, and firecraft. These may be supplemented with expertise in twine-making, knots and lashings, wood-carving, campcraft, medicine/health, natural navigation, and tool and weapon making.

Bushcraft includes skill with tools such as bushcraft knives and axes. A skilled bushcrafter can use these tools to create many different things, from dugout canoes to A-frame shelters.

Purpose-built shelters such as tents are commonly used in the wilderness. Tents can also be improvised from a large tarp or blanket. Indigenous shelters include a snow cave or bark lean-to. Natural shelters include caves, the space underneath a tree, or within thickets.

Knot-tying is an important bushcraft skill. Commonly used knots include the reef knot, figure-8 loop, improved clinch knot, clove hitch, and snare noose. The reef knot is also referred to as a square knot. It is good for bundling items together because one can tension the rope during the first part of the knot tying. Tying bandages together like a sling is a common use. The figure-8 loop forms a loop that will not draw tight. It can be used at the end of a fishing line to tie on a hook or lure. This knot is also useful to hold loads or to lift or drag items. The improved clinch knot is often used to attach a hook to a line or to attach an anchor to a rope, or for tying something to a pole or tree. The clove hitch can be used when creating a raft or to attach a shelter to a tree. It is commonly used to start a lashing, binding one thing to another such as a shelter frame. The snare noose is commonly used to catch animals. The snare consists of a noose attached to an anchor point like a shrub. As the animal moves through the noose, the line will tighten around its neck.

== Etymology ==
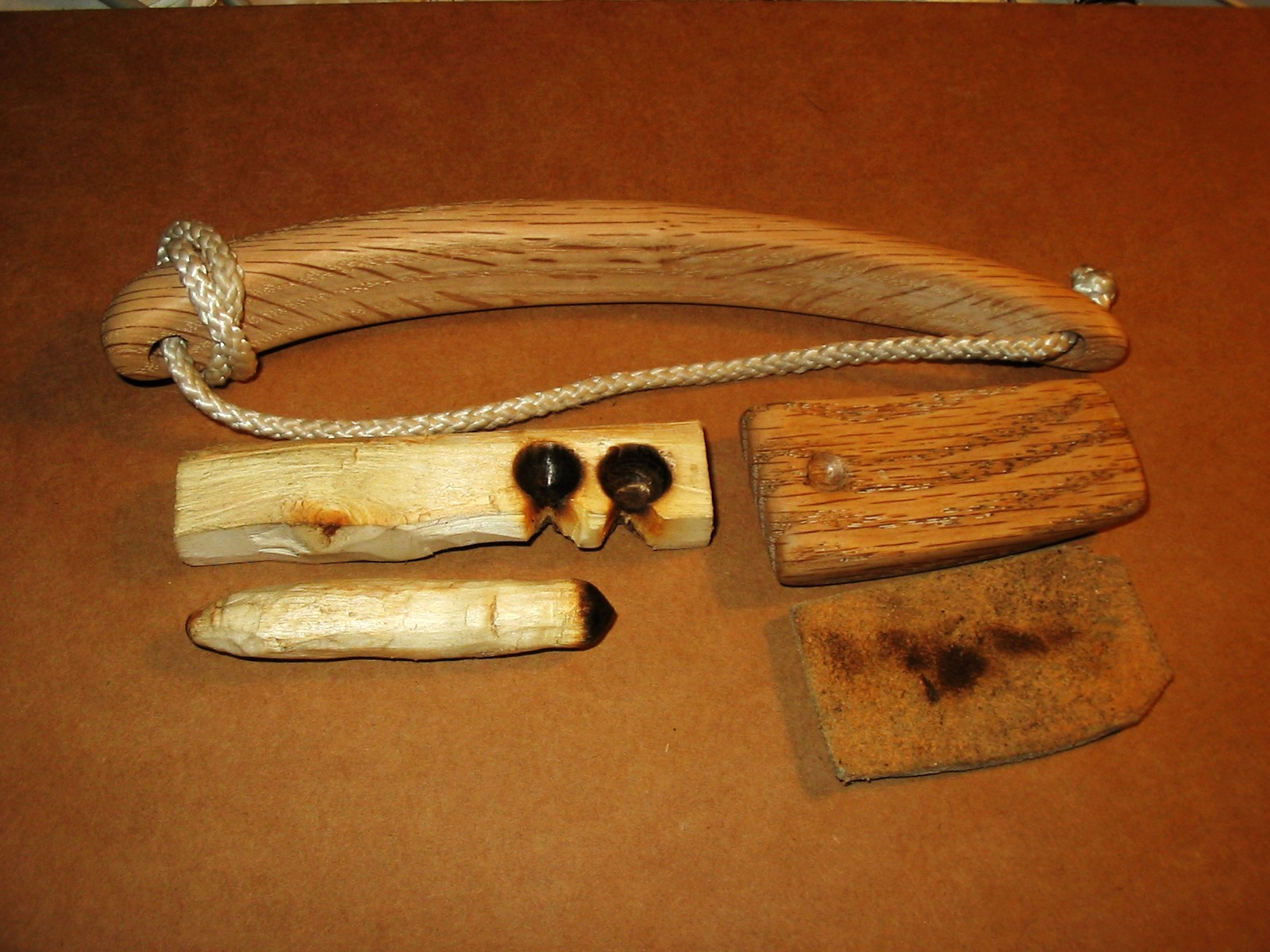
Miniature bowdrill kit

The term bushcraft originally referred to skills used in the Australian bush. The word has been used in its current sense in Australia and South Africa at least as far back as the 1800s. Bush in this sense is probably a direct adoption of the Dutch bosch (now bos; transl. "forest" ), originally used in Dutch colonies for woodland and country covered with natural wood, but extended to usage in British colonies to refer to uncleared or un-farmed districts, still in a state of nature. Later this was used by extension for the country as opposed to the town. In Southern Africa, they get Bushman from the Dutch boschjesman applied by the Dutch colonists to the natives living in the bush. In North America, where there was also considerable colonisation by the Dutch, they have the word bushwacker which is close to the Dutch bosch-wachter (now boswachter) meaning "forest keeper" or "forest ranger".

Historically, the term has been spotted in the following books (amongst others):

- Preliminary titles for The Art of Travel by Francis Galton, published in 1854, included Bushcraft or Science of Travel and Bushcraft or the Shifts and Science of Travel in Other Countries
- The History of Australian Exploration from 1788 to 1888 by Ernest Favenc; published in 1888.
- My Brilliant Career by Miles Franklin; published in 1901.
- Campaign Pictures of the War in South Africa (1899–1900) by A. G. Hales; published in 1901.
- The Explorers of Australia and their Life-work by Ernest Favenc; published in 1908.
- We of the Never-Never by Jeannie Gunn; published in 1908.
- The Life of Captain Matthew Flinders by Ernest Scott; published in 1914.

The term was popularized in the Southern Hemisphere by Les Hiddins (the Bush Tucker Man) and in the Northern Hemisphere by Mors Kochanski. It more recently gained currency in the United Kingdom due to the popularity of Ray Mears and his bushcraft and survival television programs.

=== Trademark ===
The word bushcraft was registered with the U.S. Patent and Trademark Office as a trademark by Bushcraft USA LLC on November 12, 2013, as a service mark, for "Providing an on-line forum for bushcraft," and "Providing on-line forums for transmission of messages among computer users concerning bushcraft" (Ser. No. 85690815). This led to some concern about the validity of the mark among Internet users who asserted there were senior uses of the mark in a more general context such as Mors Kochanski as early as 1981, however no formal opposition was ever filed, nor any assertion of continuous use in commerce as the mark related to Internet forums. As of 2021, Bushcraft USA has not publicly enforced its mark against other Internet forums using the term.

== Promoters ==
The Irish-born Australian writer Richard Graves titled his outdoor manuals "The 10 bushcraft books".

Canadian wilderness instructor Mors Kochanski published the "Northern Bushcraft" book in 1981 and an expanded edition of the book in 1988. He has stated on numerous occasions that book title was an explicit reference to Graves' work.

The term has enjoyed a recent popularity largely thanks to Ray Mears, Cody Lundin, Les Hiddins, Les Stroud, Dave Canterbury and Mors Kochanski and their television programs.

== See also ==
- Batoning
- Outdoor education
- Scoutcraft
- Survivalism
- Czech tramping
- Primitive Technology

=== People ===
- Bradford Angier
- Dick Proenneke
- Horace Kephart
- Jamie Maslin
- Lofty Wiseman
