= Extreme Survival =

Television series

- Also known as: Ray Mears' Extreme Survival
- Created by: Ray Mears
- Directed by: Dick Colthurst
- Presented by: Ray Mears
- Country of origin: United Kingdom
- No. of series: 3
- No. of episodes: 18

Production
- Producer: Andrew Graham-Brown
- Running time: 30 minutes (1999–2000); 50 minutes (2002)
- Production company: BBC

Original release
- Network: BBC Two
- Release: 1999 – 2002

Related
- World of Survival, Ray Mears' Bushcraft, Ray Mears Goes Walkabout

Extreme Survival (alternately titled The Ultimate Survival Guide) is a survival television series hosted by Ray Mears. The series was produced for the BBC. In the series Mears demonstrates his wilderness skills and presents tales of survival from some of the world's most difficult environments. The show was first broadcast in 1999, after the success of World of Survival from 1997 to 1998, and ended in 2002.

== Episodes ==
=== Series One ===
1. Costa Rica
2. Arctic Survival
3. Psychology of Survival
4. Sea Survival
5. Geronimo
6. Arnhemland

=== Series Two ===
1. Morocco
2. Rocky Mountains
3. Australian Desert
4. Royal Air Force
5. Alps
6. Desert Island

=== Series Three ===
1. Belarus
2. Rogers' Rangers
3. Alaska
4. Namibia
5. Thailand
6. New Zealand

== DVD release ==
The first and second series DVD, containing two discs was released on 24 March 2003. The third series was released on DVD separately on 19 May 2003. Both sets were released by Mears' own studio, Woodlore.

== See also ==
- World of Survival
- Ray Mears' Bushcraft
- Wild Food
- Ray Mears Goes Walkabout
