= Ray Mears' Bushcraft =

- Also known as: Ray Mears' Bushcraft Survival
- Created by: Ray Mears
- Directed by: Ben Southwell
- Presented by: Ray Mears
- Country of origin: United Kingdom
- No. of series: 2
- No. of episodes: 10

Production
- Running time: 50 minutes
- Production company: BBC

Original release
- Network: BBC Two
- Release: 2004 – 2005

Related
- World of Survival; Extreme Survival; Ray Mears Goes Walkabout

Bushcraft is a survival television series hosted by Ray Mears. The series airs on the BBC in United Kingdom, it also shown on Discovery Channel in the United States, Canada, India, Italy, Brazil, New Zealand, Australia, Czech Republic, Norway, Sweden, The Netherlands, Romania and Russia. Following on from Extreme Survival, Bushcraft was first shown in 2004, and ended in 2005.

== Episodes ==
=== Series 1 ===
1. "Aboriginal Britain": Mears is based in Great Britain, where he shows how Stone Age hunter-gatherers used the resources around them to feed and clothe themselves.
2. "Jungle Camp": Mears sets up a jungle camp in the Amazon rainforest close to a native village, and sees how the Yekuana live in harmony with their environment. He encounters poison dart frogs and climbs into the forest canopy to gain a different perspective on the surroundings. He also offers an insight into the people who inhabit the dense tropical environment
3. "Jungle Trek": Mears encounters huge waterfalls, clouds of butterflies on a trek through the Amazon jungle in the shadow of flat-topped mountain formations called tepuis. He then journeys to the huge rock outcrops which inspired The Land That Time Forgot and The Lost World.
4. "Africa Camp": Mears makes a return visit to northern Tanzania to spend some more time with the Hadza, sharing a love of bows, tracking and the landscape with true hunter-gatherers whose way of life demonstrates a profound connection to the natural world. This episode was withdrawn by the BBC when the series was repeated in 2019.
5. "Africa Safari": Mears fulfils a childhood dream by experiencing a true safari, Maasai-style. He teams up with a Maasai warrior in Tanzania and embarks on a walking safari. As they travel through a valley inhabited by wild animals, he spots a variety of useful plants and ends the day sleeping under the stars.

=== Series 2 ===
1. "Birch Bark Canoe": As far as Mears is concerned the birch bark canoe is the best vessel man has ever created. He has always wanted to construct one and in this programme he works with Algonquin canoe maker Pinock Smith, one of the few people left who know how to craft them using traditional methods.
2. "Canoe Journey": In Mears' view, the canoe is the most natural way to travel and to get close to wild places. To demonstrate this, he paddles down the Missinaibi River, a river as unspoilt today as it was three hundred years ago when it was the essential route for the fur trade canoes.
3. "American Prairies": Mears takes a journey into America's past as he travels in the footsteps of Jim Bridger, one of the mountain men who opened up the route to the Pacific Coast of America. Ray makes a bull boat using willow and buffalo skin and spends time with the Shoshone.
4. "Sweden": One country where the ancient skills of bushcraft are alive and well and in daily use is Sweden. Mears sees how pine tar is made and used on traditional skis before spending time with the Sami people in the north where he takes a dog sled journey into the snowy wastes.
5. "Four Seasons": Mears shows the viewer how bushcraft brings a new perspective on the countryside and its changing seasons. He points out the foods and plants that are available, from pig nuts to lime leaves. He observes wild badgers and deer and explains his interest in sleeping outdoors whenever he can.
